= 1999 World Championships in Athletics – Men's 400 metres =

Men's 400 metres at the 1999 World Championships
- Venue: Estadio Olímpico
- Dates: 22 August (heats); 23 August (quarter-finals); 24 August (semi-finals); 26 August (final)
- Competitors: 48
- Winning time: 43.18 WR

Medalists
gold medal	Michael Johnson	United States
silver medal	Sanderlei Claro Parrela	Brazil
bronze medal	Alejandro Cárdenas	Mexico

Video on YouTube Official video

These are the official results of the Men's 400 metres event at the 1999 IAAF World Championships in Seville, Spain. There were a total number of 48 participating athletes, with six qualifying heats, four quarter-finals, two semi-finals and the final held on Thursday 26 August 1999 at 8.45 pm. The winning margin was 1.11 seconds which as of May 2025 remains the greatest winning margin in the history of the men's 400 metres at these championships and the only time this race has been won by over one second. It was also a greater winning margin than the men's 5,000 metres in 1999.

== Final ==
RANK	FINAL	TIME
	Michael Johnson (USA)	43.18
	Sanderlei Claro Parrela (BRA)	44.29
	Alejandro Cárdenas (MEX)	44.31
4.	Mark Richardson (GBR)	44.65
5.	Gregory Haughton (JAM)	45.07
6.	Jamie Baulch (GBR)	45.18
	Antonio Pettigrew (USA)	DQ
	Jerome Young (USA)	DQ

== Semi-final ==
- Held on Tuesday 24 August 1999

RANK	HEAT 1	TIME
1.	Michael Johnson (USA)	43.95
2.	Alejandro Cárdenas (MEX)	44.37
3.	Sanderlei Claro Parrela (BRA)	44.37
4.	Mark Richardson (GBR)	44.47
5.	Jerome Davis (USA)	44.51
6.	Tomasz Czubak (POL)	44.62 (NR)
7.	Kennedy Ochieng (KEN)	45.57
8.	Danny McFarlane (JAM)	45.86

RANK	HEAT 2	TIME
1.	Gregory Haughton (JAM)	45.09
2.	Jamie Baulch (GBR)	45.24
3.	Matija Šestak (SLO)	45.47
4.	Ibrahima Wade (SEN)	45.66
5.	Anderson Jorge dos Santos (BRA)	45.67
	Antonio Pettigrew (USA)	DQ
	Jerome Young (USA)	DQ
	Piotr Rysiukiewicz (POL)	DNF

== Quarter-finals ==
- Held on Monday 23 August 1999

RANK	HEAT 1	TIME
1.	Jamie Baulch (GBR)	45.14
3.	Piotr Rysiukiewicz (POL)	45.54
4.	Anderson Jorge dos Santos (BRA)	45.61
5.	Jun Osakada (JPN)	45.71
6.	Michael McDonald (JAM)	45.87
7.	Udeme Ekpeyong (NGR)	46.40
8.	Jopie van Oudtshoorn (RSA)	46.42
	Antonio Pettigrew (USA)	DQ

RANK	HEAT 2	TIME
1.	Michael Johnson (USA)	45.10
2.	Tomasz Czubak (POL)	45.27
3.	Ibrahima Wade (SEN)	45.53
4.	Danny McFarlane (JAM)	45.54
5.	Sunday Bada (NGR)	45.69
6.	David Canal (ESP)	46.21
7.	Sugath Tillakeratne (SRI)	46.40
8.	Shane Niemi (CAN)	46.57

RANK	HEAT 3	TIME
1.	Alejandro Cárdenas (MEX)	44.97
2.	Mark Richardson (GBR)	44.98
3.	Kennedy Ochieng (KEN)	45.13
4.	Robert Maćkowiak (POL)	45.23
5.	Arnaud Malherbe (RSA)	45.77
6.	Marc Foucan (FRA)	45.78
	Jerome Young (USA)	DQ
	Eric Milazar (MRI)	DNS

RANK	HEAT 4	TIME
1.	Sanderlei Claro Parrela (BRA)	44.72
2.	Gregory Haughton (JAM)	45.13
3.	Jerome Davis (USA)	45.14
4.	Matija Šestak (SLO)	45.43
5.	Clement Chukwu (NGR)	45.50
6.	Ibrahim Ismail Muftah (QAT)	46.04
7.	Phillip Mukomana (ZIM)	46.36
8.	Masayoshi Kan (JPN)	46.37

== Heats ==
- Held on Saturday 21 August 1999

RANK	HEAT 1	TIME
1.	Tomasz Czubak (POL)	45.13
2.	Jerome Davis (USA)	45.25
3.	Mark Richardson (GBR)	45.26
4.	Matija Šestak (SLO)	45.47
5.	Clement Chukwu (NGR)	45.95
6.	Kenji Tabata (JPN)	46.42
7.	Adriaan Botha (RSA)	46.44
8.	Carlos Santa (DOM)	46.80

RANK	HEAT 2	TIME
1.	Alejandro Cárdenas (MEX)	45.34
2.	Michael Johnson (USA)	45.35
3.	Phillip Mukomana (ZIM)	45.63
4.	Eric Milazar (MRI)	45.90
5.	Kennedy Ochieng (KEN)	46.13
6.	Solomon Wariso (GBR)	46.61
7.	Evripides Demosthenous (CYP)	46.72
8.	Paul McBurney (IRL)	46.87

RANK	HEAT 3	TIME
1.	Michael McDonald (JAM)	45.13
2.	Sugath Tillakeratne (SRI)	45.73
3.	Ibrahim Ismail Muftah (QAT)	45.94
4.	Udeme Ekpeyong (NGR)	46.25
5.	Shane Niemi (CAN)	46.33
6.	Dmitriy Golovastov (RUS)	46.53
7.	Bothwell Namuswa (ZAM)	48.10
	Antonio Pettigrew (USA)	DQ

RANK	HEAT 4	TIME
1.	Sanderlei Claro Parrela (BRA)	45.15
2.	David Canal (ESP)	45.36
3.	Robert Maćkowiak (POL)	45.51
4.	Arnaud Malherbe (RSA)	45.56
5.	Danny McFarlane (JAM)	45.58
6.	Sunday Bada (NGR)	45.61
7.	Masayoshi Kan (JPN)	46.20
	Benjamin Youla (CGO)	DNS

RANK	HEAT 5	TIME
1.	Jamie Baulch (GBR)	45.51
2.	Ibrahima Wade (SEN)	45.76
3.	Piotr Rysiukiewicz (POL)	46.12
4.	Anastasios Goussis (GRE)	46.60
5.	Marcel Lopuchovsky (SVK)	46.97
6.	Abednego Matilu (KEN)	47.42
	Neil de Silva (TRI)	DQ
	Jerome Young (USA)	DQ

RANK	HEAT 6	TIME
1.	Anderson Jorge dos Santos (BRA)	45.72
2.	Gregory Haughton (JAM)	45.87
3.	Jun Osakada (JPN)	45.94
4.	Jopie van Oudtshoorn (RSA)	45.98
5.	Marc Foucan (FRA)	46.13
6.	Matthias Rusterholz (SUI)	46.43
7.	Alleyne Francique (GRN)	47.49
8.	Rashid Chouhal (MLT)	48.32
