= 1998 IAAF World Cup – Results =

These are the results of the 1998 IAAF World Cup, which took place in Johannesburg, South Africa on 11, 12 and 13 September 1998.

== Results ==
=== 100 m ===
==== Men ====
Pos.	Team	Competitor	Result
1	AME	Obadele Thompson	9.87 (CR)
2	AFR	Seun Ogunkoya	9.92 (PB)
3	GBR	Dwain Chambers	10.03 (PB)
4	USA	Tim Harden	10.03 (SB)
5	OCE	Matt Shirvington	10.07 (PB)
6	EUR	Haralabos Papadias	10.15 (PB)
7	GER	Marc Blume	10.30 (PB)
8	ASI	Zhou Wei	10.37

==== Women ====
Pos.	Team	Competitor	Result
1	USA	Marion Jones	10.65 (CR)
2	AME	Chandra Sturrup	10.97
3	AFR	Mary Onyali	11.05 (SB)
4	EUR	Zhanna Pintusevich	11.08
5	RUS	Irina Privalova	11.15
6	GER	Andrea Philipp	11.25
7	OCE	Lauren Hewitt	11.36 (PB)
8	ASI	Yan Jiankui	11.47

=== 200 m ===
==== Men ====
Pos.	Team	Competitor	Result
1	AFR	Frankie Fredericks	19.97 (CR)
2	USA	Gentry Bradley	20.38 (SB)
3	EUR	Troy Douglas	20.40 (SB)
4	ASI	Koji Ito	20.40 (SB)
5	GBR	Douglas Turner	20.51 (SB)
6	AME	Sebastián Keitel	20.62
7	OCE	Darryl Wohlsen	20.75
8	GER	Manuel Milde	20.85 (PB)

==== Women ====
Pos.	Team	Competitor	Result
1	USA	Marion Jones	21.62 (CR)
2	AFR	Falilat Ogunkoya	22.25
3	EUR	Zhanna Pintusevich	22.35 (SB)
4	AME	Beverly McDonald	22.36
5	RUS	Irina Privalova	22.61 (SB)
6	GER	Melanie Paschke	22.70 (SB)
7	OCE	Tania Van Heer	22.93
8	ASI	Yan Jiankui	23.19

=== 400 m ===
==== Men ====
Pos.	Team	Competitor	Result
1	GBR	Iwan Thomas	45.33
2	USA	Jerome Young	45.37
3	AME	Troy McIntosh	45.45
4	AFR	Clement Chukwu	45.56
5	EUR	Ashraf Saber	46.54
6	ASI	Sugath Tillakaratne	46.70
7	OCE	Patrick Dwyer	46.99
8	GER	Stefan Letzelter	47.12

==== Women ====
Pos.	Team	Competitor	Result
1	AFR	Falilat Ogunkoya	49.52 (SB)
2	GER	Grit Breuer	49.86
3	AME	Sandie Richards	50.33
4	EUR	Helena Fuchsová	50.40
5	RUS	Olga Kotlyarova	51.20
6	USA	Kim Graham	52.10
7	ASI	Damayanthi Darsha	53.30
8	OCE	Jane Arnott	54.36

=== 800 m ===
==== Men ====
Pos.	Team	Competitor	Result
1	GER	Nils Schumann	1:48.66
2	USA	Mark Everett	1:48.73
3	AME	Norberto Tellez	1:48.92
4	AFR	Japheth Kimutai	1:49.16
5	EUR	André Bucher	1:49.55
6	GBR	Andrew Hart	1:50.07
7	OCE	Shaun Farrell	1:50.69
8	ASI	Cheng Bin	1:53.11

==== Women ====
Pos.	Team	Competitor	Result
1	AFR	Maria de Lurdes Mutola	1:59.88
2	RUS	Yelena Afanasyeva	2:00.20
3	AME	Letitia Vriesde	2:00.56
4	USA	Jearl Miles Clark	2:01.58
5	EUR	Malin Ewerlöf	2:02.61
6	ASI	Zhang Jian	2:03.09
7	GER	Heike Meissner	2:04.50
8	OCE	Tamsyn Lewis	2:06.64

=== 1500 m ===
==== Men ====
Pos.	Team	Competitor	Result
1	AFR	Laban Rotich	3:40.87
2	EUR	Rui Silva	3:40.95
3	GBR	Anthony Whiteman	3:40.99
4	ASI	Mohamed Sulaiman	3:46.93
5	OCE	Hamish Christensen	3:48.64
6	GER	Mark Ostendarp	3:49.56
7	USA	Jason Pyrah	3:52.10
8	AME	Steve Agar	3:57.36

==== Women ====
Pos.	Team	Competitor	Result
1	RUS	Svetlana Masterkova	4:09.41
2	AFR	Jackline Maranga	4:10.30
3	EUR	Carla Sacramento	4:11.66
4	USA	Suzy Favor-Hamilton	4:12.52
5	GER	Luminița Zaituc	4:16.80
6	AME	Leah Pells	4:18.37
7	OCE	Mandy Giblin	4:29.50
8	ASI	Liu Jing	DNS

=== 3000 m ===
==== Men ====
Pos.	Team	Competitor	Result
1	GER	Dieter Baumann	7:56.24
2	EUR	Isaac Viciosa	7:56.47
3	AFR	Tom Nyariki	7:59.46
4	AME	Pablo Olmedo	8:10.58
5	ASI	Toshinari Takaoka	8:12.19
6	USA	Dan Browne	8:15.88
7	GBR	Neil Caddy	8:16.81
8	OCE	Alan Bunce	8:20.98

==== Women ====
Pos.	Team	Competitor	Result
1	EUR	Gabriela Szabo	9:00.54
2	AFR	Zahra Ouaziz	9:01.35
3	USA	Regina Jacobs	9:11.15
4	ASI	Wang Chunmei	9:14.50 (PB)
5	RUS	Olga Yegorova	9:16.72
6	GER	Luminița Zaituc	9:18.01
7	AME	Kathy Butler	9:30.34
8	OCE	Natalie Harvey	9:38.22

=== 5000 m ===
==== Men ====
Pos.	Team	Competitor	Result
1	AFR	Daniel Komen	13:46.57
2	OCE	Shaun Creighton	13:53.66
3	GER	Dieter Baumann	13:58.40
4	AME	Pablo Olmedo	14:01.66
5	GBR	Keith Cullen	14:13.32
6	USA	Dan Browne	14:22.48
7	EUR	Abdellah Béhar	14:24.41
8	ASI	Chand Gulab	DNF

==== Women ====
Pos.	Team	Competitor	Result
1	EUR	Sonia O'Sullivan	16:24.52
2	USA	Regina Jacobs	16:26.24
3	AFR	Berhane Adere	16:38.81
4	AME	Nora Rocha	16:44.60
5	GER	Irina Mikitenko	16:46.60
6	ASI	Liu Shixiang	16:51.74
7	RUS	Svetlana Baigulova	17:00.29
8	OCE	Melissa Moon	17:10.48

=== 3000 m Steeplechase ===
==== Men ====
Pos.	Team	Competitor	Result
1	GER	Damian Kallabis	8:31.25
2	AFR	Bernard Barmasai	8:31.85
3	ASI	Saad Shaddad Al-Asmari	8:39.69
4	EUR	Alessandro Lambruschini	8:54.10
5	GBR	Christian Stephenson	8:55.67
6	AME	Wander do Prado Moura	8:59.06
7	USA	Pascal Dobert	9:08.36
8	OCE	Stephen Thurston	9:37.13

=== 100/110 m hurdles ===
==== Men (110 m) ====
Pos.	Team	Competitor	Result
1	GER	Falk Balzer	13.10
2	GBR	Colin Jackson	13.11
3	AME	Anier García	13.14
4	EUR	Robin Korving	13.25
5	ASI	Chen Yanhao	13.49
6	OCE	Rod Zuyderwyk	13.78
7	AFR	Shawn Bownes	21.33
8	USA	Reggie Torian	30.29

==== Women (100 m) ====
Pos.	Team	Competitor	Result
1	AFR	Glory Alozie	12.58
2	USA	Angie Vaughn	12.67
3	RUS	Irina Korotya	12.77
4	AME	Dionne Rose	12.78
5	GER	Caren Soon	12.87
6	OCE	Debbie Edwards	13.30
-	EUR	Nicole Ramalalanirina	DNF
-	ASI	Olga Shishigina	DNF

=== 400 m hurdles ===
==== Men ====
Pos.	Team	Competitor	Result
1	AFR	Samuel Matete	48.08 (SB)
2	ASI	Mubarak Al-Nubi	48.17 (PB)
3	AME	Dinsdale Morgan	48.40
4	EUR	Paweł Januszewski	48.49
5	USA	Joey Woody	48.55
6	GER	Steffen Kolb	49.77
7	GBR	Anthony Borsumato	49.86
8	OCE	Zid Abou Hamed	50.50

==== Women ====
Pos.	Team	Competitor	Result
1	AFR	Nezha Bidouane	52.96 (CR)
2	AME	Deon Hemmings	53.03 (SB)
3	USA	Kim Batten	53.17
4	EUR	Ionela Târlea	54.01
5	GER	Silvia Rieger	54.22 (PB)
6	RUS	Anna Knoroz	56.09
7	ASI	Li Rui	57.64
8	OCE	Evette Cordy	58.00

=== High jump ===
==== Men ====
Pos.	Team	Competitor	Result
1	USA	Charles Austin	2.31
2	AME	Javier Sotomayor	2.28
3	EUR	Sergey Klyugin	2.28
4	GER	Martin Buss	2.25
5	ASI	Zhou Zhongge	2.15
=6	OCE	Nick Moroney	2.10
=6	AFR	Abderrahmane Hammad	2.10
=6	GBR	Dalton Grant	2.10

==== Women ====
Pos.	Team	Competitor	Result
1	EUR	Monica Dinescu-Iagăr	1.98
2	AFR	Hestrie Storbeck	1.96 (PB)
3	USA	Tisha Waller	1.93
4	RUS	Yelena Gulyayeva	1.93
5	ASI	Miki Imai	1.93
6	GER	Alina Astafei	1.90
7	OCE	Alison Inverarity	1.85
8	AME	Juana Rosario	1.85

=== Pole vault ===
==== Men ====
Pos.	Team	Competitor	Result
1	EUR	Maksim Tarasov	5.85
2	GER	Tim Lobinger	5.80
3	USA	Jeff Hartwig	5.70
4	ASI	Igor Potapovich	5.60
5	AFR	Riaan Botha	5.60
6	GBR	Mike Edwards	5.40
7	OCE	Paul Burgess	5.20
8	AME	Ricardo Diez	5.00

=== Long jump ===
==== Men ====
Pos.	Team	Competitor	Result
1	AME	Iván Pedroso	8.37
2	OCE	Jai Taurima	8.32 (PB)
3	AFR	Hatem Mersal	8.26 (PB)
4	EUR	Kirill Sosunov	8.08
5	USA	Roland McGhee	7.79
6	ASI	Masaki Morinaga	7.76
7	GER	Kofi Amoah Prah	7.75
8	GBR	Steve Phillips	7.66

==== Women ====
Pos.	Team	Competitor	Result
1	GER	Heike Drechsler	7.07
2	USA	Marion Jones	7.00
3	ASI	Guan Yingnan	6.74
4	RUS	Lyudmila Galkina	6.73
5	EUR	Tünde Vaszi	6.72
6	OCE	Nicole Boegman	6.64
7	AFR	Chioma Ajunwa	6.62
8	AME	Flora Hyacinth	6.02

=== Triple jump ===
==== Men ====
Pos.	Team	Competitor	Result
1	GER	Charles Friedek	17.42 (SB)
2	EUR	Denis Kapustin	17.32
3	AME	Yoelbi Quesada	17.25
4	AFR	Andrew Owusu	17.21
5	USA	LaMark Carter	17.20
6	OCE	Andrew Murphy	16.89 (SB)
7	GBR	Larry Achike	16.69
8	ASI	Duan Qifeng	14.09

==== Women ====
Pos.	Team	Competitor	Result
1	EUR	Olga Vasdeki	14.64 (CR)
2	RUS	Tatyana Lebedeva	14.36
3	AME	Yamilé Aldama	14.29
4	ASI	Ren Ruiping	14.04
5	USA	Sheila Hudson-Strudwick	13.76 (SB)
6	AFR	Baya Rahouli	13.69
7	OCE	Nicole Mladenis	12.86
8	GER	Nkechi Madubuko	12.76

=== Shot put ===
==== Men ====
Pos.	Team	Competitor	Result
1	USA	John Godina	21.48
2	EUR	Aleksandr Bagach	20.45
3	GER	Oliver-Sven Buder	20.42
4	AFR	Burger Lambrechts	20.29 (PB)
5	GBR	Mark Proctor	19.66
6	AME	Yojer Medina	19.08
7	OCE	Justin Anlezark	18.26
8	ASI	Bilal Saad Mubarak	18.21

==== Women ====
Pos.	Team	Competitor	Result
1	EUR	Vita Pavlysh	20.59
2	RUS	Irina Korzhanenko	19.04
3	USA	Connie Price-Smith	18.79
4	AME	Yumileidi Cumbá	18.76
5	ASI	Li Meisu	18.00
6	GER	Nadine Kleinert	17.60
7	OCE	Tania Lutton	15.73
8	AFR	Mariam Nnodu-Ibekwe	15.60

=== Discus ===
==== Men ====
Pos.	Team	Competitor	Result
1	EUR	Virgilijus Alekna	69.66 (CR)
2	GER	Lars Riedel	67.47
3	AFR	Frantz Kruger	65.73 (PB)
4	USA	John Godina	65.15
5	GBR	Robert Weir	64.39 (SB)
6	AME	Alexis Elizalde	62.53
7	ASI	Li Shaojie	61.37
8	OCE	Ian Winchester	60.56

==== Women ====
Pos.	Team	Competitor	Result
1	GER	Franka Dietzsch	67.07
2	EUR	Nicoleta Grasu	66.25
3	RUS	Natalya Sadova	64.38
4	OCE	Beatrice Faumuina	63.77
5	ASI	Liu Fengying	60.42
6	USA	Kristin Kuehl	59.88
7	AFR	Elizna Naudé	51.39
8	AME	Elisângela Adriano	51.26

=== Hammer ===
==== Men ====
Pos.	Team	Competitor	Result
1	EUR	Tibor Gécsek	82.68 (CR)
2	GER	Heinz Weis	80.13
3	ASI	Andrey Abduvaliyev	79.40
4	AME	Alberto Sánchez	73.71
5	GBR	Michael Jones	72.89
6	USA	Jud Logan	70.51
7	AFR	Chris Harmse	68.34
8	OCE	Justin McDonald	59.62

=== Javelin ===
==== Men ====
Pos.	Team	Competitor	Result
1	GBR	Steve Backley	88.71 (CR)
2	EUR	Sergey Makarov	86.96 (SB)
3	GER	Raymond Hecht	84.92
4	AFR	Marius Corbett	83.53
5	AME	Emeterio González	80.72
6	OCE	Adrian Hatcher	73.75
7	ASI	Zhang Lianbiao	68.35
8	USA	Ed Kaminski	DNS

==== Women ====
Pos.	Team	Competitor	Result
1	OCE	Joanna Stone	69.85 (PB)
2	AME	Sonia Bisset	65.50
3	EUR	Mikaela Ingberg	64.24
4	RUS	Tatyana Shikolenko	63.77
5	GER	Tanja Damaske	62.51
6	ASI	Li Lei	59.45
7	USA	Windy Dean	52.46
8	AFR	Lindy Leveau	43.18

=== 4 × 100 m relay ===
==== Men ====
Pos.	Team	Competitor	Result
1	GBR	Allyn Condon, Marlon Devonish, Julian Golding, Dwain Chambers	38.09
2	USA	Jonathan Carter, Curtis Perry, Allen Johnson, Tim Harden	38.25
3	AFR	Seun Ogunkoya, Leonard Myles-Mills, Frankie Fredericks, Eric Nkansah	38.29
4	AME	Bradley McCuaig, Édson Ribeiro, Sebastián Keitel, Claudinei da Silva	38.33
5	OCE	Darryl Wohlsen, Damien Marsh, David Baxter, Matt Shirvington	38.78
6	EUR	Thierry Lubin, Frederic Krantz, Christophe Cheval, Needy Guims	38.80
7	GER	Patrick Schneider, Holger Blume, Manuel Milde, Marc Blume	38.89
8	ASI	Zhou Wei, Lin Wei, Yin Hanzhao, Han Chaoming	39.35

==== Women ====
Pos.	Team	Competitor	Result
1	USA	Cheryl Taplin, Chryste Gaines, Inger Miller, Carlette Guidry-White	42.00
2	AME	Tanya Lawrence, Chandra Sturrup, Beverly McDonald, Philomena Mensah	42.44
3	GER	Melanie Paschke, Gabi Rockmeier, Birgit Rockmeier, Andrea Philipp	42.81
4	AFR	Chioma Ajunwa, Endurance Ojokolo, Rose Aboaja, Mary Onyali	42.91
5	RUS	Irina Privalova, Oksana Ekk, Natalya Pomoshchnikova-Voronova, Irina Korotya	43.11
6	OCE	Tania Van Heer, Lauren Hewitt, Sharon Cripps, Anna Smythe	43.40
7	EUR	Katia Benth, Frederique Bangué, Fabe Dia, Petya Pendareva	43.70
8	ASI	Saraswati Dey, Rachita Mistry, E.B. Shyla, Yan Jiankui	47.12

=== 4 × 400 m relay ===
==== Men ====
Pos.	Team	Competitor	Result
1	GBR	Mark Hylton, Jamie Baulch, Sean Baldock, Iwan Thomas	2:59.71
2	AME	Michael McDonald, Troy McIntosh, Alejandro Cárdenas, Roxbert Martin	2:59.77
3	AFR	Clement Chukwu, Ibrahima Wade, Arnaud Malherbe, Davis Kamoga	3:01.08
4	GER	Klaus Ehmsperger, Jens Dautzenberg, Marc Alexander Scheer, Nils Schumann	3:03.65
5	ASI	Ibrahim Ismail Faraj, Sugath Tillakaratne, Kenji Tabata, Masayoshi Kan	3:03.94
6	EUR	Konstantinos Kenteris, Marc Foucan, Marco Vaccari, Pawel Januszewski	3:03.95
7	OCE	Casey Vincent, Michael Hazel, Scott Thom, Brad Jamieson	3:08.57
DSQ	USA	Mark Everett, Antonio Pettigrew, Joey Woody, Jerome Young

==== Women ====
Pos.	Team	Competitor	Result
1	GER	Anke Feller, Uta Rohländer, Ulrike Urbansky, Grit Breuer	3:24.26
2	AME	Norfalia Carabalí, Deon Hemmings, Andrea Blackett, Sandie Richards	3:24.39
3	RUS	Natalya Khrushchelyova, Svetlana Goncharenko, Yekaterina Bakhvalova, Olga Kotlyarova	3:25.15
4	USA	Monique Hennagan, Rochelle Stevens, Kim Graham, Jearl Miles Clark	3:25.34
5	EUR	Ionela Târlea, Yelena Rurak, Tetyana Tereshchuk, Helena Fuchsová	3:26.34
6	OCE	Lee Naylor, Anna Smythe, Tamsyn Lewis, Tania Van Heer	3:31.67
7	AFR	Ony Paule Ratsimbazafy, Amy Mbacké Thiam, Tacko Diouf, Falilat Ogunkoya	3:35.28
8	ASI	Li Rui, Chen Yuxiang, Svetlana Bodritskaya, Damayanthi Darsha	3:43.60
