= 1999 World Championships in Athletics – Men's 4 × 400 metres relay =

The Men's 4 × 400 metres relay event at the 1999 World Championships in Athletics was held at the Estadio Olímpico de Sevilla on August 28 and August 29.

After Antonio Pettigrew later admitted to taking banned substances, the winning US team was retrospectively disqualified.

== Medals ==
| Gold | Silver | Bronze |
|---|---|---|
| Poland; Tomasz Czubak; Robert Maćkowiak; Jacek Bocian; Piotr Haczek | Jamaica; Michael McDonald; Gregory Haughton; Danny McFarlane; Davian Clarke | South Africa; Jopie van Oudtshoorn; Hendrick Mokganyetsi; Adriaan Botha; Arnaud Malherbe |

== Results ==
=== Heats ===
All times shown are in minutes.

AR area record | CR championship record | GR games record | NR national record | OR Olympic record | PB personal best | SB season best | WL world leading (in a given season)
DNS = did not start | DQ = disqualification | NM = no mark (i.e. no valid result) | Q = qualification by place in heat | q = qualification by overall place

==== Heat 1 ====
1. Bahamas (Timothy Munnings, Troy McIntosh, Carl Oliver, Chris Brown) 3:01.17 Q
2. France (Pierre-Marie Hilaire, Marc Foucan, Marc Raquil, Fred Mango) 3:01.31 Q (SB)
3. Great Britain (Geoff Dearman, Mark Hylton, Jared Deacon, Jamie Baulch) 3:02.21
4. Japan (Jun Osakada, Koji Ito, Kenji Tabata, Kazuhiko Yamazaki) 3:02.50 (SB)
5. Spain (Antonio Andrés, Juan Vicente Trull, Andrés Martínez, David Canal) 3:02.85 (SB)
6. Australia (Patrick Dwyer, Brad Jamieson, Scott Thom, Mark Moresi) 3:04.78
7. Canada (Shane Niemi, Alexandre Marchand, Byron Goodwin, Monte Raymond) 3:05.60
  - Saudi Arabia (Hamdan Odha Al-Bishi, Mohamed Al-Bishi, Hamed Hamadan Al-Bishi, Hadi Soua'an Al-Somaily) DQ

==== Heat 2 ====
1. United States (Jerome Davis, Joey Woody, Danny McCray, Angelo Taylor) 3:00.79 Q (SB)
2. Senegal (Ousmane Niang, Ibou Faye, Alpha Babacar Sall, Ibrahima Wade) 3:02.53 Q (SB)
3. Germany (Maik Liebe, Marco Krause, Ruwen Faller, Thomas Goller) 3:02.68 (SB)
4. Brazil (Cleverson da Silva, Anderson Jorge dos Santos, Eronilde Nunes de Araújo, Sanderlei Claro Parrela) 3:05.70
5. Ireland (Gary Ryan, Paul McBurney, Tomas Coman, Paul McKee) 3:05.81

Botswana (Rampa Mosweu, Lulu Basinyi, California Molefe, Johnson Kubisa) DQ
Nigeria (Udeme Ekpeyong, Jude Monye, Fidelis Gadzama, Sunday Bada) DQ
Hungary (Péter Nyilasi, Balázs Korányi, Zsolt Szeglet, Tibor Bédi) DNF

==== Heat 3 ====
1. South Africa (Jopie van Oudtshoorn, Hendrick Mokganyetsi, Adriaan Botha, Arnaud Malherbe) 3:00.77 Q (SB)
2. Poland (Robert Maćkowiak, Jacek Bocian, Piotr Długosielski, Piotr Haczek) 3:00.86 Q (SB)
3. Jamaica (Paston Coke, Davian Clarke, Omar A. Brown, Michael McDonald) 3:01.38 q
4. Russia (Daniyil Shekin, Andrey Semyonov, Valentine Koulbatskiy, Dmitriy Golovastov) 3:01.51 q (SB)
5. Switzerland (Laurent Clerc, Mathias Rusterholz, Alain Rohr, Marcel Schelbert) 3:02.46 (NR)
6. Slovenia (Miro Kocuvan, Boštjan Horvat, Joze Vrtačič, Matija Šestak) 3:02.70 (NR)
7. Greece (Panayiotis Sarris, Anastasios Gousis, Yeoryios Doupis, Periklis Iakovakis) 3:04.07 (NR)
8. Zimbabwe (Temba Ncube, Philip Mukomana, Savieri Ngidhi, Ken Harnden) 3:07.69

=== Final ===
1. Poland (Tomasz Czubak, Robert Maćkowiak, Jacek Bocian, Piotr Haczek) 2:58.91 (SB)
2. Jamaica (Michael McDonald, Gregory Haughton, Danny McFarlane, Davian Clarke) 2:59.34
3. South Africa (Jopie van Oudtshoorn, Hendrick Mokganyetsi, Adriaan Botha, Arnaud Malherbe) 3:00.20 (NR)
4. France (Pierre-Marie Hilaire, Marc Foucan, Marc Raquil, Fred Mango) 3:00.59 (SB)
5. Russia (Daniyil Shekin, Andrey Semyonov, Valentine Koulbatskiy, Dmitriy Golovastov) 3:00.98 (SB)
6. Bahamas (Timothy Munnings, Troy McIntosh, Carl Oliver, Chris Brown) 3:02.74
7. Senegal (Ousmane Niang, Assane Diallo, Ibou Faye, Ibrahima Wade) 3:03.80

United States (Jerome Davis, Antonio Pettigrew, Angelo Taylor, Michael Johnson) DQ
