= Athletics at the 1997 Summer Universiade – Men's 4 × 400 metres relay =

The men's 4 × 400 metres relay event at the 1997 Summer Universiade was held at the Stadio Cibali in Catania, Italy, on 30 and 31 August.

== Results ==
=== Heats ===
Rank	Heat	Nation	Athletes	Time	Notes
1	2	Great Britain	Richard Knowles, Chris Rawlinson, Jared Deacon, Mark Sesay	3:04.97	Q
2	2	Australia	Patrick Dwyer, Lewis Rangott, Brad Jamieson, Declan Stack	3:05.07	Q
3	1	Jamaica	Linval Laird, Garth Robinson, Dennis Blake, Ian Weakley	3:05.25	Q
4	1	United States	Tony Wheeler, Octavius Terry, David Dopek, ?	3:05.38	Q
5	2	Germany	Jens Dautzenberg, Alexander Müller, Nico Motchebon, Uwe Eisenbeis	3:05.91	q
6	2	Russia	Vladislav Shiryayev, Dmitriy Guzov, Dmitriy Golovastov, Stanislav Gabidulin	3:05.95	q
7	3	South Africa	Mario Toerien, Adriaan Botha, Barnaby Shone, ?	3:07.13	Q
8	3	Nigeria	Kenneth Enyiazu, Yakubi Bello, Udeme Ekpeyong, Clement Chukwu	3:07.93	Q
9	2	Poland	Grzegorz Krzosek, Paweł Januszewski, Bartosz Gruman, Piotr Długosielski	3:09.17	
10	1	Austria	Rafik Elouardi, Martin Lachkovics, Andreas Rechbauer, Christoph Pöstinger	3:10.01	
11	3	Switzerland	Thomas Portmann, Adrian Melliger, Daniel Dubois, Marcel Schelbert	3:10.91	
12	3	Botswana	Justice Dipeba, Rampa Mosweu, Paohane Bothale, Modise Bakupi	3:11.40	
13	2	Namibia	Immanuel Kharigub, Christie van Wyk, Erwin Naimhwaka, Willie Smith	3:15.13	
14	1	Canada	Alexandre Marchand, Laurier Primeau, Daryl Fillion, Jeff Hayhoe	3:19.09	
15	3	Jordan	Nidal Shelbaya, Omar Khalaf, Raiea Khrasat, Ahmed Faquieh	3:30.52	

=== Final ===
Rank	Nation	Athletes	Time	Notes
1st place, gold medalist(s)	United States	Jerome Davis, Bryan Woodward, Octavius Terry, Tony Wheeler	3:02.53	
2nd place, silver medalist(s)	Jamaica	Dennis Blake, Linval Laird, Ian Weakley, Garth Robinson	3:02.68	
3rd place, bronze medalist(s)	Great Britain	Richard Knowles, Sean Baldock, Mark Sesay, Jared Deacon	3:02.74	
4	South Africa	Llewellyn Herbert, Mario Toerien, Adriaan Botha, Arnaud Malherbe	3:05.33	
5	Russia	Stanislav Gabidulin, Dmitriy Guzov, Dmitriy Golovastov, Ruslan Mashchenko	3:05.81	
6	Australia	Brad Jamieson, Declan Stack, Lewis Rangott, Patrick Dwyer	3:06.52	
7	Nigeria	Kenneth Enyiazu, Yakubi Bello, Udeme Ekpeyong, Clement Chukwu	3:06.56	
8	Germany	Nico Motchebon, Uwe Eisenbeis, Alexander Müller, Jens Dautzenberg	3:06.66	
