= Athletics at the 1999 Summer Universiade – Men's 400 metres =

The men's 400 metres event at the 1999 Summer Universiade was held at the Estadio Son Moix in Palma de Mallorca, Spain on 8, 10 and 12 July.

== Medalists ==
Gold	Silver	Bronze
Jerome Davis; United States	Paston Coke; Jamaica	Jopie van Oudtshoorn; South Africa

== Results ==
=== Heats ===
Rank	Heat	Athlete	Nationality	Time	Notes
1	6	Jerome Davis	United States	46.48	Q
2	6	Jared Deacon	Great Britain	46.76	Q
3	2	Geoff Dearman	Great Britain	46.81	Q
4	6	Marcel Lopuchovský	Slovakia	46.83	Q
5	4	Kunle Adejuyigbe	Nigeria	46.91	Q
6	3	Jopie van Oudtshoorn	South Africa	46.93	Q
7	7	Mariano Mesa	Cuba	46.95	Q
8	5	Lars Figura	Germany	46.96	Q
9	3	Daniyil Shchokin	Russia	47.05	Q
9	6	Mathias Rusterholz	Switzerland	47.05	Q
11	3	Paul McKee	Ireland	47.08	Q
12	3	Kim Jae-da	South Korea	47.09	Q
13	2	Juliën Hagen	Netherlands	47.16	Q
14	5	Ousmane Niang	Senegal	47.18	Q
15	3	Ingūns Svikliņš	Latvia	47.19	q
16	7	Tomas Coman	Ireland	47.22	Q
17	7	Jens Dautzenberg	Germany	47.27	Q
18	4	Evripides Demosthenous	Cyprus	47.30	Q
19	3	Rampa Mosveu	Botswana	47.31	q
19	6	Rikard Rasmusson	Sweden	47.31	q
21	3	Julius Edwards	United States	47.32	q
22	5	Paston Coke	Jamaica	47.34	Q
23	6	Francesco Cundo	Italy	47.39	
24	5	Alain Rohr	Switzerland	47.42	Q
25	2	Andrey Semenov	Russia	47.52	Q
26	2	Christian Birk	Denmark	47.66	Q
27	1	Philippe Bouche	France	47.67	Q
28	2	Rova Rabemananjara	Canada	47.70	
29	1	Adriaan Botha	South Africa	47.84	Q
30	1	Kieran Gallagher	Australia	47.87	Q
30	7	Opeoluwa Sogbayi	Nigeria	47.87	Q
32	7	Magnus Aare	Sweden	47.92	
33	4	Clayton Veltman	Australia	47.96	Q
34	2	Ilya Dzhivondov	Bulgaria	47.99	
34	5	Djamel Belaid	Algeria	47.99	
34	6	Sande Kasajja	Uganda	47.99	
37	1	Frank Fiske	Norway	48.03	Q
38	1	Papa Serigne Diene	Senegal	48.09	
39	4	Arden Kelly	Puerto Rico	48.41	Q
40	4	Chang Po-Chih	Chinese Taipei	48.42	
41	7	Josh Martin	New Zealand	48.44	
42	5	Miguel Cosme	Puerto Rico	48.49	
43	7	Erwin Namhwaka	Namibia	48.57	
44	4	Raimundo Silva	Chile	49.14	
45	4	Abdelajauil Kelkel	Algeria	50.00	
46	1	Chan Chi Hong	Hong Kong	51.44	
47	5	Christian Carranza	Costa Rica	51.58	
48	1	Ernest Jere	Malawi	51.94	
49	2	Modisa Bakupi	Botswana	52.68	
50	6	Edward Grecht	Malta	53.25	
	4	Don Bruno	Canada	DQ	R141.2
	7	Peter Kerema	Kenya	DQ	R141.2
	2	Eliud Wainaina	Kenya	DNS	
	3	Farid da Graça	São Tomé and Príncipe	DNS	

=== Quarterfinals ===
Rank	Heat	Athlete	Nationality	Time	Notes
1	3	Jerome Davis	United States	46.11	Q
2	1	Mariano Mesa	Cuba	46.28	Q
3	4	Andrey Semenov	Russia	46.43	Q
4	2	Juliën Hagen	Netherlands	46.45	Q
5	2	Paston Coke	Jamaica	46.46	Q
6	4	Adriaan Botha	South Africa	46.48	Q
7	3	Jared Deacon	Great Britain	46.52	Q
8	2	Philippe Bouche	France	46.56	Q
9	2	Geoff Dearman	Great Britain	46.56	Q
10	1	Tomas Coman	Ireland	46.57	Q
11	1	Jopie van Oudtshoorn	South Africa	46.60	Q
12	3	Daniyil Shchokin	Russia	46.61	Q
13	2	Marcel Lopuchovský	Slovakia	46.62	
14	3	Jens Dautzenberg	Germany	46.68	Q
15	4	Lars Figura	Germany	46.69	Q
16	1	Evripides Demosthenous	Cyprus	46.77	Q
17	1	Mathias Rusterholz	Switzerland	46.78	
18	4	Ousmane Niang	Senegal	46.79	Q
19	2	Kim Jae-da	South Korea	47.09	
19	3	Paul McKee	Ireland	47.09	
21	1	Ingūns Svikliņš	Latvia	47.36	
22	4	Rampa Mosveu	Botswana	47.41	
23	3	Alain Rohr	Switzerland	47.42	
24	4	Frank Fiske	Norway	47.49	
25	1	Kieran Gallagher	Australia	47.50	
26	1	Arden Kelly	Puerto Rico	47.53	
27	3	Rikard Rasmusson	Sweden	47.72	
28	4	Clayton Veltman	Australia	47.83	
29	2	Opeoluwa Sogbayi	Nigeria	48.07	
30	3	Christian Birk	Denmark	48.12	
31	2	Julius Edwards	United States	48.22	
	4	Abecugibe Adekunle	Nigeria	DQ	R141.2

=== Semifinals ===
Rank	Heat	Athlete	Nationality	Time	Notes
1	2	Paston Coke	Jamaica	45.36	Q, PB
2	2	Jopie van Oudtshoorn	South Africa	45.50	Q
3	1	Jerome Davis	United States	45.62	Q
4	2	Mariano Mesa	Cuba	45.78	Q, SB
5	1	Adriaan Botha	South Africa	45.83	Q
6	2	Jared Deacon	Great Britain	45.88	Q, PB
7	2	Juliën Hagen	Netherlands	45.98	PB
8	1	Andrey Semenov	Russia	46.02	Q, SB
9	1	Tomas Coman	Ireland	46.07	Q, PB
10	1	Geoff Dearman	Great Britain	46.16	
10	2	Evripides Demosthenous	Cyprus	46.16	NR
12	1	Philippe Bouche	France	46.19	SB
13	2	Daniyil Shchokin	Russia	46.24	SB
14	2	Jens Dautzenberg	Germany	46.38	
15	1	Lars Figura	Germany	46.41	
	1	Ousmane Niang	Senegal	DNF	

=== Final ===
Rank	Athlete	Nationality	Time	Notes
1st place, gold medalist(s)	Jerome Davis	United States	44.91	
2nd place, silver medalist(s)	Paston Coke	Jamaica	45.15	
3rd place, bronze medalist(s)	Jopie van Oudtshoorn	South Africa	45.21	
4	Adriaan Botha	South Africa	45.49	
5	Jared Deacon	Great Britain	46.02	
6	Mariano Mesa	Cuba	46.07	
7	Andrey Semenov	Russia	46.08	
	Tomas Coman	Ireland	DNS	
