= 2001 World Championships in Athletics – Men's 400 metres =

These are the official results of the Men's 400 metres event at the 2001 IAAF World Championships in Edmonton, Canada. There were a total number of 55 participating athletes, with seven qualifying heats, three semi-finals and the final held on Monday 6 August 2001 at 18:25h. The winning margin was 0.23 seconds.

== Medalists ==
Gold	(The Bahamas) Avard Moncur; Bahamas (BAH)
Silver	Ingo Schultz; Germany (GER)
Bronze	Gregory Haughton; Jamaica (JAM)

== Records ==
Standing records prior to the 2001 World Athletics Championships
World Record	Michael Johnson (USA)	43.18	August 26, 1999	Seville, Spain
Event Record	Michael Johnson (USA)	43.18	August 26, 1999	Seville, Spain
Season Best	Tyree Washington (USA)	44.28	May 12, 2001	Los Angeles, United States

== Final ==
RANK	FINAL	TIME
	Avard Moncur (BAH)	44.64
	Ingo Schultz (GER)	44.87
	Gregory Haughton (JAM)	44.98
4.	Eric Milazar (MRI)	45.13
5.	Hamdan O. Al-Bishi (KSA)	45.23
6.	Alleyne Francique (GRN)	46.23
—	Robert Maćkowiak (POL)	DNF
—	Antonio Pettigrew (USA)	DQ

== Semi-finals ==
- Held on Sunday 5 August 2001

RANK	HEAT 1	TIME
1.	Avard Moncur (BAH)	44.89
2.	Alleyne Francique (GRN)	45.11
3.	Mark Richardson (GBR)	45.14
4.	Marc Raquil (FRA)	45.22
5.	David Canal (ESP)	45.50
6.	Anderson Jorge dos Santos (BRA)	45.83
7.	Piotr Rysiukiewicz (POL)	46.12
—	Antonio Pettigrew (USA)	DQ

RANK	HEAT 2	TIME
1.	Gregory Haughton (JAM)	44.83
2.	Eric Milazar (MRI)	44.92
3.	Hamdan O. Al-Bishi (KSA)	45.10
4.	Leonard Byrd (USA)	45.39
5.	Shane Niemi (CAN)	45.91
6.	Hendrick Mokganyetsi (RSA)	45.99
7.	Piotr Długosielski (POL)	46.62
8.	Iwan Thomas (GBR)	46.72

RANK	HEAT 3	TIME
1.	Ingo Schultz (GER)	44.66
2.	Robert Maćkowiak (POL)	44.84
3.	Malik Louahla (ALG)	45.14
4.	Jerome Young (USA)	45.43
5.	Marcus La Grange (RSA)	45.44
6.	Jimisola Laursen (SWE)	45.62
7.	Sugath Thilakaratne (SRI)	46.69
—	Michael McDonald (JAM)	DNF

== Heats ==
Held on Tuesday 7 August 2001

RANK	HEAT 1	TIME
1.	Avard Moncur (BAH)	44.88
2.	Marcus La Grange (RSA)	45.20
3.	Robert Maćkowiak (POL)	45.27
4.	Anderson Jorge dos Santos (BRA)	45.47
5.	Karel Bláha (CZE)	45.82
6.	Tomas Coman (IRL)	45.90
—	Yevgeniy Zyukov (UKR)	DQ

RANK	HEAT 2	TIME
1.	Alleyne Francique (GRN)	45.66
2.	Mark Richardson (GBR)	45.66
3.	Piotr Rysiukiewicz (POL)	45.92
4.	Ezra Sambu (KEN)	46.18
5.	Amin Badany Goma'a (EGY)	46.29
6.	Alessandro Attene (ITA)	46.56
7.	Kenji Tabata (JPN)	46.68
8.	Carlton Fortune (SUR)	52.69

RANK	HEAT 3	TIME
1.	Hamdan O. Al-Bishi (KSA)	45.00
2.	Michael McDonald (JAM)	45.02
3.	Sugath Thilakaratne (SRI)	45.41
4.	Jerome Young (USA)	45.57
5.	Ato Modibo (TRI)	45.82
6.	Takahiko Yamamura (JPN)	47.22
7.	Alvaro James (CRC)	47.46
8.	Youba Ould Mohamed (MTN)	47.87

RANK	HEAT 4	TIME
1.	Eric Milazar (MRI)	45.94
2.	Piotr Długosielski (POL)	46.49
3.	Sanjay Ayre (JAM)	46.96
4.	Adriaan Botha (RSA)	47.32
5.	Kenmore Hughes (ATG)	48.18
6.	Meshaal Saad Al-Harbi (KUW)	48.19
—	Arnold Payne (ZIM)	DNF
—	Antonio Pettigrew (USA)	DQ

RANK	HEAT 5	TIME
1.	Gregory Haughton (JAM)	45.54
2.	David Canal (ESP)	45.60
3.	Iwan Thomas (GBR)	45.92
4.	Christopher Brown (BAH)	46.01
5.	Sunday Bada (NGR)	46.12
6.	Flávio Godoy (BRA)	46.13
7.	Muhamad Zaiful Zainal Abidin (MAS)	46.46
8.	Kerth Gumbs (AIA)	57.83

RANK	HEAT 6	TIME
1.	Ingo Schultz (GER)	45.11
2.	Leonard Byrd (USA)	45.35
3.	Shane Niemi (CAN)	45.41
4.	Jimisola Laursen (SWE)	45.54
5.	Rohan Pradeep Kumara (SRI)	46.46
6.	Sofiane Labidi (TUN)	47.03
7.	William Hernández (VEN)	47.26
8.	Bheki Malima (SWZ)	49.61

RANK	HEAT 7	TIME
1.	Malik Louahla (ALG)	45.13
2.	Hendrick Mokganyetsi (RSA)	45.15
3.	Marc Raquil (FRA)	45.55
4.	Benjamin Youla (CGO)	45.92
5.	Jamie Baulch (GBR)	46.15
6.	Dmitriy Golovastov (RUS)	46.22
7.	Jun Osakada (JPN)	46.86
8.	Emmanuel De Lorenzi (MON)	55.57
