= 1997 World Championships in Athletics – Men's 4 × 400 metres relay =

These are the results of the Men's 4 × 400 metres relay event at the 1997 World Championships in Athletics in Athens, Greece.

The gold medal was originally won by the US team, but the team were retrospectively disqualified in 2009 after Antonio Pettigrew admitted to using human growth hormone and EPO between 1997 and 2003.

== Medalists ==
Gold	Silver	Bronze
Great Britain; Iwan Thomas; Roger Black; Jamie Baulch; Mark Richardson; Mark Hylton*	Jamaica; Michael McDonald; Gregory Haughton; Danny McFarlane; Davian Clarke; Linval Laird*	Poland; Tomasz Czubak; Piotr Rysiukiewicz; Piotr Haczek; Robert Maćkowiak

* Runners who participated in the heats only and received medals.

== Results ==
=== Heats ===
Qualification: First 2 of each heat (Q) plus the 2 fastest times (q) advance to the final.

Rank	Heat	Nation	Athletes	Time	Notes
1	2	Poland	Tomasz Czubak, Piotr Rysiukiewicz, Piotr Haczek, Robert Maćkowiak	2:59.91	Q, NR
2	2	Jamaica	Linval Laird, Davian Clarke, Gregory Haughton, Danny McFarlane	2:59.98	Q, SB
3	1	Great Britain	Mark Hylton, Roger Black, Jamie Baulch, Iwan Thomas	3:00.19	Q
4	2	South Africa	Arnaud Malherbe, Hezekiel Sepeng, Hendrik Mokganyetsi, Llewellyn Herbert	3:00.19	q, NR
5	3	Zimbabwe	Tawanda Chiwira, Phillip Mukomana, Savieri Ngidhi, Ken Harnden	3:00.19	Q, NR
6	3	Italy	Ashraf Saber, Marco Vaccari, Andrea Nuti, Fabrizio Mori	3:01.75	q, SB
7	1	France	Jean-Louis Rapnouil, Marc Foucan, Fred Mango, Stephane Diagana	3:01.76	Q, SB
8	1	Austria	Christoph Postinger, Thomas Griesser, Andreas Rechbauer, Rafik Elouardi	3:02.95	NR
9	2	Russia	Mikhail Vdovin, Innokentiy Zharov, Dmitriy Golovastov, Ruslan Mashchenko	3:03.35	
10	3	Japan	Shunji Karube, Seiji Inagaki, Hiroyuki Hayashi, Shigekazu Omori	3:03.35	SB
11	1	Nigeria	Ayuba Machen, Tony Ogbeta, Udeme Ekpeyong, Clement Chukwu	3:04.19	
12	2	Latvia	Sergejs Inšakovs, Egīls Tēbelis, Einārs Tupurītis, Ingūns Svikliņš	3:04.30	NR
13	1	Algeria	Samir-Adel Louahla, Talhaodi Kamel, Malik-Khaled Louahla, Amar Hacini	3:05.22	
14	3	Switzerland	Laurent Clerc, Kevin Widmer, Matthias Rusterholz, Marcel Schelbert	3:05.34	SB
15	1	Spain	César Martínez, Antonio Andres, Pablo Jaime Vallejo, David Canal	3:05.34	
15	2	Greece	Panagiotis Sarris, Konstantinos Moumoulidis, Georgios Batsikas, Periklis Iakovakis	3:05.43	NR
16	3	Czech Republic	Jan Poděbradský, Jiří Svenek, Jan Stejfa, Jiří Mužík	3:05.65	
17	1	Botswana	Justice Dipeba, Lulu Basinyi, Rampa Mosweu, Johnson Kubisa	3:05.96	NR
	3	United States	Jerome Young, Antonio Pettigrew, Chris Jones, Allen Johnson	DQ	

=== Final ===
Rank	Nation	Competitors	Time	Notes
1st place, gold medalist(s)	Great Britain	Iwan Thomas, Roger Black, Jamie Baulch, Mark Richardson	2:56.65	
2nd place, silver medalist(s)	Jamaica	Michael McDonald, Gregory Haughton, Danny McFarlane, Davian Clarke	2:56.75	NR
3rd place, bronze medalist(s)	Poland	Tomasz Czubak, Piotr Rysiukiewicz, Piotr Haczek, Robert Maćkowiak	3:00.26	
4	South Africa	Arnaud Malherbe, Hezekiel Sepeng, Hendrik Mokganyetsi, Llewellyn Herbert	3:00.26	NR
5	France	Jean-Louis Rapnouil, Marc Foucan, Fred Mango, Stephane Diagana	3:01.07	
6	Zimbabwe	Tawanda Chiwira, Phillip Mukomana, Savieri Ngidhi, Ken Harnden	3:01.43	
7	Italy	Ashraf Saber, Marco Vaccari, Andrea Nuti, Fabrizio Mori	3:01.52	
DSQ	United States	Jerome Young, Antonio Pettigrew, Chris Jones, Tyree Washington	2:56.47	
