= Athletics at the 1999 Summer Universiade – Men's 4 × 400 metres relay =

The men's 4 × 400 metres relay event at the 1999 Summer Universiade was held at the Estadio Son Moix in Palma de Mallorca, Spain on 12–13 July.

== Results ==
=== Heats ===
Rank	Heat	Nation	Athletes	Time	Notes
1	2	United States	Tony Berrian, Brandon Couts, Derrick Peterson, Derrick Brew	3:05.03	Q
2	1	Germany	Steffen Kolb, Jens Dautzenberg, Jan Schneider, Lars Figura	3:05.82	Q
3	1	Senegal	Ousmane Niang, Papa Serigne Diene, Jules Doumbya, Alpha Babacar Sall	3:06.46	Q
4	2	Great Britain	Richard Knowles, John Stewart, Graham Beasley, Geoff Dearman	3:06.54	Q
5	2	Ireland	Brian Forbes, Brian Liddy, Gary Ryan, Paul McKee	3:07.06	q
6	2	Canada	Don Bruno, Rova Rabemananjara, Monte Raymond, Byron Goodwin	3:07.26	q
7	2	Russia	Daniyil Shchokin, Sergey Voronin, Erkinjon Isakov, Filip Salov	3:12.32	q
8	2	Botswana	Justice Dipeba, Elliot Phelaphela, Kebaitse Legojane, Rampa Mosveu	3:12.96	q
9	1	Algeria	Djamel Belaid, Abdelkader Mokrane, Abdelajauil Kelkel, Malik Louahla	3:18.15	SB
	1	Puerto Rico	Luis Soto, Arden Kelly, Miguel Cosme, Luiggi Llanos	DQ	R141.2
	1	Nigeria	Bolaji Lawal, Tomy Ogbu, Kenneth Enyiazu, Kunle Adejuyigbe	DQ	
	2	Switzerland	Ivo Signer, Mathias Rusterholz, Daniel Dubois, Alain Rohr	DQ	R161.7
	1	Jamaica	Raoul Harvey, Christopher Williams, Patrick Jarret, Paston Coke	DNF	

=== Final ===
Rank	Nation	Athletes	Time	Notes
1st place, gold medalist(s)	United States	Tony Berrian, Brandon Couts, Derrick Brew, Jerome Davis	3:00.88	
2nd place, silver medalist(s)	Great Britain	Richard Knowles, Geoff Dearman, Chris Rawlinson, Jared Deacon	3:03.95	
3rd place, bronze medalist(s)	Senegal	Ousmane Niang, Papa Serigne Diene, Jules Doumbya, Alpha Babacar Sall	3:05.45	
4	Germany	Steffen Kolb, Jens Dautzenberg, Jan Schneider, Lars Figura	3:06.03	
5	Botswana	Justice Dipeba, Elliot Phelaphela, Kebaitse Legojane, Rampa Mosveu	3:15.65	
	Canada	Don Bruno, Rova Rabemananjara, Monte Raymond, Byron Goodwin	DQ	R141.2
	Ireland	Gary Ryan, Brian Liddy, Paul McKee, Brian Forbes	DQ	R161.1
	Russia		DNS	
