= Mathias Rusterholz =

Swiss sprinter (born 1971)

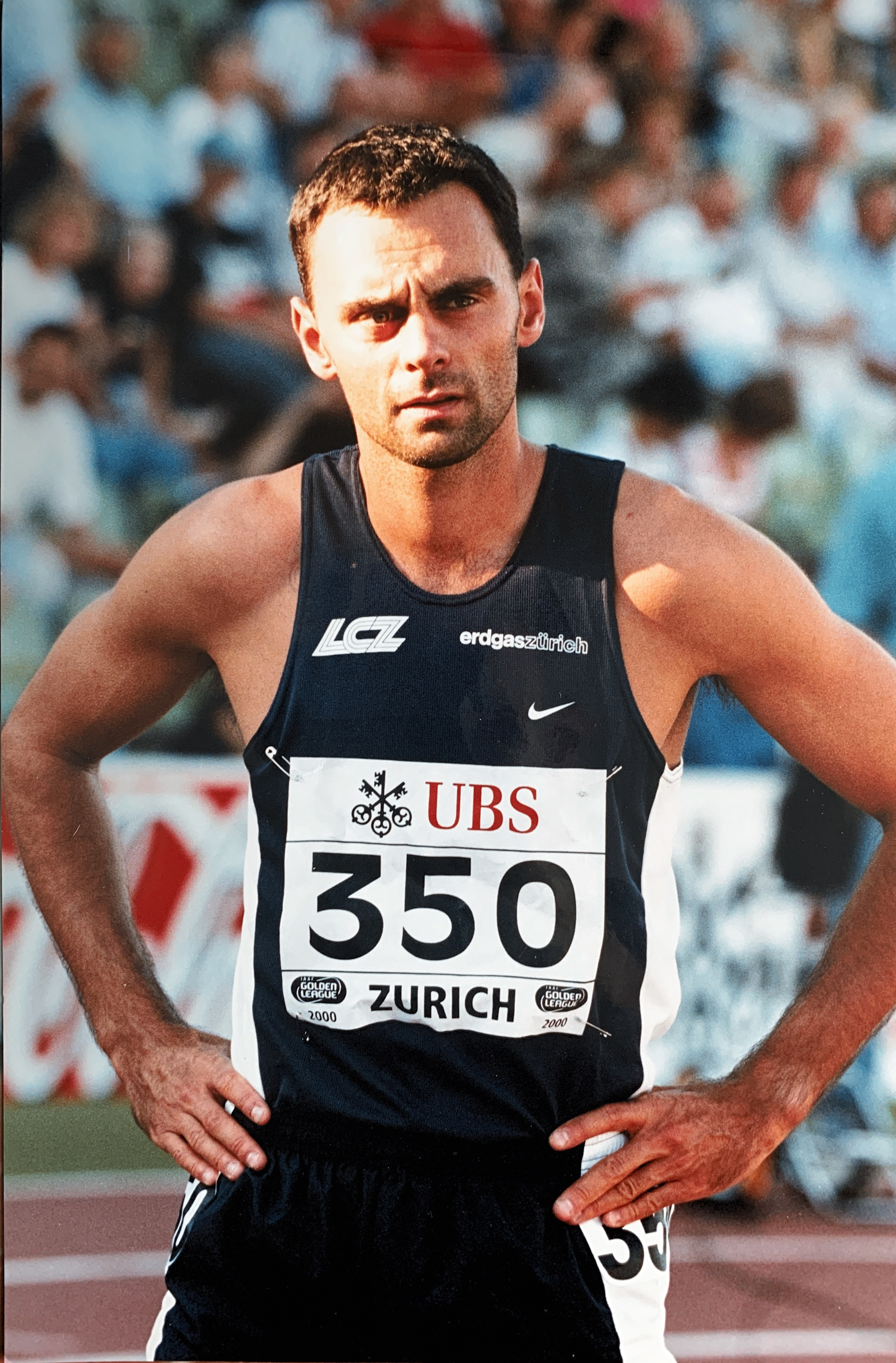
- Mathias Rusterholz, 2000

Personal information
- Born: 16 August 1971 (age 55) Herisau, Switzerland
- Height: 1.83 m (6 ft 0 in)
- Weight: 71 kg (157 lb)

Sport
- Sport: Track and field
- Event: 400 metres
- Club: TV Herisau
Medal record
Men's athletics
Representing Switzerland
European Championships
Bronze medal – third place	1994 Helsinki	400 m

Mathias Rusterholz (born 16 August 1971 in Herisau) is a retired Swiss sprinter who specialised in the 400 metres. He represented his country at the 1996 Summer Olympics, as well as three outdoor and one indoor World Championships. In addition, he won the bronze medal at the 1994 European Championships.

With the personal records of 44.99 seconds, he is the standing Swiss record holder.

== Competition record ==
Year	Competition	Venue	Position	Event	Notes
Representing Switzerland
1989	European Junior Championships	Varaždin, Yugoslavia	10th (sf)	400 m	48.19
1990	World Junior Championships	Plovdiv, Bulgaria	13th (sf)	400 m	47.04
1994	European Championships	Helsinki, Finland	3rd	400 m	45.96
1994	World Cup	London, United Kingdom	5th	400 m	45.92
1994	World Cup	London, United Kingdom	3rd	4 × 400 m relay	3.03.26
1995	World Championships	Gothenburg, Sweden	11th (sf)	400 m	45.80
1995	World Championships	Gothenburg, Sweden	14th (h)	4 × 400 m relay	3:03.91
1996	Olympic Games	Atlanta, United States	23rd (qf)	400 m	45.72
1996	Olympic Games	Atlanta, United States	13th (sf)	4 × 400 m relay	3:05.36
1997	World Indoor Championships	Paris, France	13th (sf)	400 m	47.16
1997	World Championships	Athens, Greece	19th (qf)	400 m	45.89
1997	World Championships	Athens, Greece	14th (h)	4 × 400 m relay	3:05.34
1997	Universiade	Catania, Italy	(qf)	400 m	46.25
1998	European Championships	Budapest, Hungary	5th	4 × 400 m relay	3:02.91
1999	Universiade	Palma, Spain	17th (qf)	400 m	46.78
1999	Universiade	Palma, Spain	–	4 × 400 m relay	DQ
1999	World Championships	Seville, Spain	34th (h)	400 m	46.43
1999	World Championships	Seville, Spain	9th (h)	4 × 400 m relay	3:02.46

== Personal bests ==
Outdoor

- 200 metres – 21.00 (-1.0 m/s) (Hochdorf 1995)
- 400 metres – 44.99 (Lausanne 1996)

Indoor

- 400 metres – 46.62 (Liévin 1997)
