= 2001 European Athletics U23 Championships – Men's 400 metres =

The men's 400 metres event at the 2001 European Athletics U23 Championships was held in Amsterdam, Netherlands, at Olympisch Stadion on 12 and 13 July.

== Medalists ==
Gold	Yuriy Borzakovskiy; Russia
Silver	Marc Alexander Scheer; Germany
Bronze	Rafał Wieruszewski; Poland

== Results ==
=== Final ===
13 July

Rank	Name	Nationality	Time	Notes
1st place, gold medalist(s)	Yuriy Borzakovskiy	Russia	46.06	
2nd place, silver medalist(s)	Marc Alexander Scheer	Germany	46.43	
3rd place, bronze medalist(s)	Rafał Wieruszewski	Poland	46.57	
4	Filip Walotka	Poland	46.58	
5	Oleg Mishukov	Russia	46.60	
6	David Naismith	United Kingdom	46.84	
7	Tomas Coman	Ireland	47.24	
8	Andrea Barberi	Italy	47.46	

=== Heats ===
12 July
Qualified: first 2 in each heat and 2 best to the Final

==== Heat 1 ====
Rank	Name	Nationality	Time	Notes
1	Rafał Wieruszewski	Poland	46.72	Q
2	David Naismith	United Kingdom	46.82	Q
3	Dmitrijs Miļkevičs	Latvia	46.94	
4	Simon Kirch	Germany	47.00	
5	Dávid Csesznegi	Hungary	47.40	
6	Ionut-Lucian Vieru	Romania	47.58	
7	Stilianos Kopanou	Greece	48.25	

==== Heat 2 ====
Rank	Name	Nationality	Time	Notes
1	Tomas Coman	Ireland	46.82	Q
2	Oleg Mishukov	Russia	47.02	Q
3	Ruwen Faller	Germany	47.28	
4	Cédric Van Branteghem	Belgium	47.65	
5	Luca Galletti	Italy	47.71	
6	Dmitriy Chumichkin	Azerbaijan	48.03	
	Anastasios Gousis	Greece	DNS	

==== Heat 3 ====
Rank	Name	Nationality	Time	Notes
1	Yuriy Borzakovskiy	Russia	46.20	Q
2	Marc Alexander Scheer	Germany	46.42	Q
3	Filip Walotka	Poland	46.63	q
4	Andrea Barberi	Italy	46.81	q
5	Salvador Rodríguez	Spain	47.24	
6	Fabrice Zircon	France	47.58	
7	Branimir Peitel	Croatia	47.61	

== Participation ==
According to an unofficial count, 20 athletes from 15 countries participated in the event.

- Azerbaijan (1)
- Belgium (1)
- Croatia (1)
- France (1)
- Germany (3)
- Greece (1)
- Hungary (1)
- Ireland (1)
- Italy (2)
- Latvia (1)
- Poland (2)
- Romania (1)
- Russia (2)
- Spain (1)
- United Kingdom (1)
