= Tomas Coman =

Irish sprinter

Tom Coman
Personal information
- Nationality: Irish
- Born: 10 November 1979 (age 46) Thurles, Ireland
- Height: 1.90 m (6 ft 3 in)
- Weight: 82 kg (181 lb)

Sport
- Sport: Athletics
- Event: 400 metres
- College team: Waterford IT; University of Limerick
- Club: Moycarkey Coolcroo AC; Templemore Athletic Club

Tomás "Tom" Coman (born 10 November 1979) is an Irish retired athlete who specialised in the 400 metres. He represented his country at the 2000 Summer Olympics, as well as the 1999 and 2001 World Championships.

His personal bests in the event are 45.84 seconds outdoors (Santry 2000) and 46.34 seconds indoor (Vienna 2002).

== Competition record ==
| Year | Competition | Venue | Position | Event | Notes |
Representing Ireland
| 1998 | World Junior Championships | Annecy, France | 9th (sf) | 400 m | 46.82 |
| 1999 | Universiade | Palma de Mallorca, Spain | 9th (sf) | 400 m | 46.07^{1} |
| 1999 | World Championships | Seville, Spain | 23rd (h) | 4x400 m relay | 3:05.81 |
| 2000 | Olympic Games | Sydney, Australia | 38th (h) | 400 m | 46.17 |
| 2000 | Olympic Games | Sydney, Australia | 23rd (h) | 4x400 m relay | 3:07.42 |
| 2001 | European U23 Championships | Amsterdam, Netherlands | 7th | 400 m | 47.24 |
| 2001 | World Championships | Edmonton, Canada | 22nd (h) | 400 m | 45.90 |
| 2001 | World Championships | Edmonton, Canada | 18th (h) | 4x400 m relay | 3:04.26 |
| 2002 | European Indoor Championships | Vienna, Austria | 6th (sf) | 400 m | 46.34 |
| 2005 | Universiade | İzmir, Turkey | 6th | 400 m | 46.75 |

^{1}: Did not start in the final
