= Dmitry Golovastov =

Russian sprinter

Dmitriy Golovastov
Personal information
- Born: 14 July 1971 (age 55) Moscow, Soviet Union
- Height: 1.87 m (6 ft 2 in)
- Weight: 78 kg (172 lb)

Sport
- Sport: Track and field
- Event: 400 metres
- Club: Moskva Sports Club
Medal record
Men's athletics
Representing Russia
European Championships
Bronze medal – third place	1994 Helsinki	4×400 m

Dmitriy Anatolyevich Golovastov (Russian: Дмитрий Анатольевич Головастов; born 14 July 1971 in Moscow) is a Russian former track and field sprinter who specialised in the 400 metres. He competed at the 1992 and 2000 Summer Olympics, as well as three outdoor and three indoor World Championships.

His personal bests in the event are 45.26 seconds outdoors (Yokohama 2000) and 46.45 seconds indoors (Turin 1996).

== Competition record ==
Year	Competition	Venue	Position	Event	Notes
Representing the Soviet Union
1989	European Junior Championships	Varaždin, Yugoslavia	3rd	400 m	47.31
1989	European Junior Championships	Varaždin, Yugoslavia	1st	4 × 400 m relay	3:10.14
1990	World Junior Championships	Plovdiv, Bulgaria	4th	400 m	46.43
1990	World Junior Championships	Plovdiv, Bulgaria	4th	4 × 400 m relay	3:05.60
1990	European Championships	Split, Yugoslavia	13th (sf)	400 m	46.22
1990	European Championships	Split, Yugoslavia	8th	4 × 400 m relay	3:04.17
1991	World Indoor Championships	Seville, Spain	–	400 m	DNF
1991	World Indoor Championships	Seville, Spain	5th	4 × 400 m relay	3:09.20
Representing the Unified Team
1992	Olympic Games	Barcelona, Spain	14th (h)	4 × 400 m relay	3:05.59
1992	World Cup	Havana, Cuba	8th	4 × 400 m relay	3:10.38
Representing Russia
1993	World Championships	Stuttgart, Germany	21st (qf)	400 m	46.00
1993	World Championships	Stuttgart, Germany	14th (h)	4 × 400 m relay	3:05.59
1994	Goodwill Games	St. Petersburg, Russia	5th	4 × 400 m relay	45.62
1994	Goodwill Games	St. Petersburg, Russia	3rd	4 × 400 m relay	3:02.70
1994	European Championships	Helsinki, Finland	4th	400 m	46.01
1994	European Championships	Helsinki, Finland	3rd	4 × 400 m relay	3:03.10
1997	World Indoor Championships	Paris, France	4th	4 × 400 m relay	3:09.75
1997	World Championships	Athens, Greece	9th (h)	4 × 400 m relay	3:03.35
1997	Universiade	Catania, Italy	6th (sf)	400 m	47.54
1997	Universiade	Catania, Italy	5th	4 × 400 m relay	3:05.81
1998	European Championships	Budapest, Hungary	12th (sf)	400 m	45.93
1998	European Championships	Budapest, Hungary	–	4 × 400 m relay	DNF
1999	World Championships	Seville, Spain	34th (h)	400 m	46.53
1999	World Championships	Seville, Spain	5th	4 × 400 m relay	3:00.98
2000	European Indoor Championships	Ghent, Belgium	–	4 × 400 m relay	DQ
2000	Olympic Games	Sydney, Australia	23rd (qf)	400 m	45.66
2000	Olympic Games	Sydney, Australia	9th (sf)	4 × 400 m relay	3:02.28
2001	World Championships	Edmonton, Canada	32nd (h)	400 m	46.22
2001	World Championships	Edmonton, Canada	10th (h)	4 × 400 m relay	3:01.95
2002	European Indoor Championships	Vienna, Austria	–	400 m	DNF
2003	World Indoor Championships	Birmingham, United Kingdom	3rd (h)	4 × 400 m relay	3:08.71
