= 1994 European Athletics Championships – Men's 400 metres =

Men's 400 metres at the European Athletics Championships

The men's 400 metres event at the 1994 European Athletics Championships was held in Helsinki, Finland, at Helsinki Olympic Stadium on 8, 9, and 11 August 1994.

== Medalists ==
| Gold | Du'aine Thorne-Ladejo; Great Britain |
| Silver | Roger Black; Great Britain |
| Bronze | Matthias Rusterholz; Switzerland |

== Results ==
=== Final ===
11 August

| Rank | Name | Nationality | Time | Notes |
|---|---|---|---|---|
| 1st place, gold medalist(s) | Du'aine Thorne-Ladejo | Great Britain | 45.09 | |
| 2nd place, silver medalist(s) | Roger Black | Great Britain | 45.20 | |
| 3rd place, bronze medalist(s) | Matthias Rusterholz | Switzerland | 45.96 | |
| 4 | Dmitriy Golovastov | Russia | 46.01 | |
| 5 | Anton Ivanov | Bulgaria | 46.20 | |
| 6 | Mikhail Vdovin | Russia | 46.23 | |
| 7 | Štefan Balošák | Slovakia | 46.64 | |
| 8 | Dmitriy Kosov | Russia | 46.69 | |

=== Semi-finals ===
9 August

==== Semi-final 1 ====
| Rank | Name | Nationality | Time | Notes |
|---|---|---|---|---|
| 1 | Du'aine Thorne-Ladejo | Great Britain | 45.70 | Q |
| 2 | Mikhail Vdovin | Russia | 45.85 | Q |
| 3 | Matthias Rusterholz | Switzerland | 45.88 | Q |
| 4 | Anton Ivanov | Bulgaria | 46.10 | Q |
| 5 | Daniel Bittner | Germany | 46.44 | |
| 6 | Marco Vaccari | Italy | 46.57 | |
| 7 | David McKenzie | Great Britain | 46.65 | |
| 8 | Nenad Đurović | Independent European Participants | 47.44 | |

==== Semi-final 2 ====
| Rank | Name | Nationality | Time | Notes |
|---|---|---|---|---|
| 1 | Roger Black | Great Britain | 45.79 | Q |
| 2 | Dmitriy Golovastov | Russia | 46.05 | Q |
| 3 | Dmitriy Kosov | Russia | 46.23 | Q |
| 4 | Štefan Balošák | Slovakia | 46.32 | Q |
| 5 | Alessandro Aimar | Italy | 46.33 | |
| 6 | Pierre-Marie Hilaire | France | 46.39 | |
| 7 | Tomasz Czubak | Poland | 47.05 | |
| 8 | Kari Louramo | Finland | 47.37 | |

=== Heats ===
8 August

==== Heat 1 ====
| Rank | Name | Nationality | Time | Notes |
|---|---|---|---|---|
| 1 | Roger Black | Great Britain | 45.88 | Q |
| 2 | Pierre-Marie Hilaire | France | 46.25 | Q |
| 3 | Anton Ivanov | Bulgaria | 46.29 | Q |
| 4 | Marco Vaccari | Italy | 46.32 | Q |
| 5 | Dmitriy Golovastov | Russia | 46.48 | q |
| 6 | Daniel Bittner | Germany | 46.62 | q |
| 7 | Kari Louramo | Finland | 46.83 | q |

==== Heat 2 ====
| Rank | Name | Nationality | Time | Notes |
|---|---|---|---|---|
| 1 | Du'aine Thorne-Ladejo | Great Britain | 46.50 | Q |
| 2 | Alessandro Aimar | Italy | 46.52 | Q |
| 3 | Dmitriy Kosov | Russia | 46.79 | Q |
| 4 | Tomasz Czubak | Poland | 46.95 | Q |
| 5 | Tom McGuirk | Ireland | 47.14 | |
| 6 | Lutz Becker | Germany | 47.52 | |
| | Slobodan Branković | Independent European Participants | DNS | |

==== Heat 3 ====
| Rank | Name | Nationality | Time | Notes |
|---|---|---|---|---|
| 1 | Matthias Rusterholz | Switzerland | 46.12 | Q |
| 2 | Mikhail Vdovin | Russia | 46.61 | Q |
| 3 | Štefan Balošák | Slovakia | 46.62 | Q |
| 4 | David McKenzie | Great Britain | 46.78 | Q |
| 5 | Nenad Đurović | Independent European Participants | 46.84 | q |
| 6 | Andrea Nuti | Italy | 46.87 | |
| 7 | Kai Karsten | Germany | 47.22 | |
| 8 | Evripides Demosthenous | Cyprus | 47.40 | |

== Participation ==
According to an unofficial count, 21 athletes from 13 countries participated in the event.

- Bulgaria (1)
- Cyprus (1)
- Finland (1)
- France (1)
- Germany (3)
- Great Britain (3)
- Independent European Participants (1)
- Ireland (1)
- Italy (3)
- Poland (1)
- Russia (3)
- Slovakia (1)
- Switzerland (1)
