= Štefan Balošák =

Slovak sprinter (born 1972)

Personal information
- Born: 23 November 1972 (age 53) Martin, Czechoslovakia
- Height: 1.81 m (5 ft 11 in)
- Weight: 72 kg (159 lb)

Sport
- Sport: Athletics
- Event: 400 metres
- Club: Dukla Banská Bystrica

Štefan Balošák (born 23 November 1972 in Martin) is a Slovak former sprinter who specialised in the 400 metres. He represented his country at the 1996 and 2000 Summer Olympics as well as the 1997 World Championships.

His personal bests in the event are 45.32 seconds outdoors (Atlanta 1996) and 47.06 seconds indoors (Budapest 1997). The first result is the standing national record.

== International competitions ==
Year	Competition	Venue	Position	Event	Notes
Representing Czechoslovakia
1990	World Junior Championships	Plovdiv, Bulgaria	27th (h)	400 m	48.57
1990	World Junior Championships	Plovdiv, Bulgaria	15th (h)	4 × 400 m relay	3:11.85
Representing Slovakia
1994	European Championships	Helsinki, Finland	7th	400 m	46.64
1996	Olympic Games	Atlanta, United States	14th (sf)	400 m	45.59
1997	World Championships	Athens, Greece	18th (qf)	400 m	45.48
1998	European Championships	Budapest, Hungary	21st (h)	400 m	46.87
2000	Olympic Games	Sydney, Australia	44th (h)	400 m	46.42
2000	Olympic Games	Sydney, Australia	27th (h)	4 × 400 m relay	3:09.54
