= 1990 World Junior Championships in Athletics – Men's 400 metres =

The men's 400 metres event at the 1990 World Junior Championships in Athletics was held in Plovdiv, Bulgaria, at Deveti Septemvri Stadium on 8, 9 and 10 August.

== Medalists ==
Gold	Chris Nelloms; United States
Silver	Rico Lieder; East Germany
Bronze	Mark Richardson; United Kingdom

== Results ==
=== Final ===
10 August

Rank	Name	Nationality	Time	Notes
1st place, gold medalist(s)	Chris Nelloms	United States	45.43	
2nd place, silver medalist(s)	Rico Lieder	East Germany	46.28	
3rd place, bronze medalist(s)	Mark Richardson	United Kingdom	46.33	
4	Dmitriy Golovastov	Soviet Union	46.43	
5	Derek Mills	United States	46.44	
6	Ibrahim Ismail	Qatar	46.52	
7	Du'aine Thorne-Ladejo	United Kingdom	47.53	
	Amar Hecini	Algeria	DNF	

=== Semifinals ===
9 August

==== Semifinal 1 ====
Rank	Name	Nationality	Time	Notes
1	Chris Nelloms	United States	45.93	Q
2	Mark Richardson	United Kingdom	46.34	Q
3	Rico Lieder	East Germany	46.43	Q
4	Dmitriy Golovastov	Soviet Union	46.47	Q
5	Joseph Chepsiror Kiptanui	Kenya	46.48	
6	Mathias Rusterholz	Switzerland	47.04	
7	Inaldo de Sena	Brazil	47.09	
8	Daniel England	Jamaica	47.70	

==== Semifinal 2 ====
Rank	Name	Nationality	Time	Notes
1	Ibrahim Ismail	Qatar	46.06	Q
2	Amar Hecini	Algeria	46.08	Q
3	Derek Mills	United States	46.43	Q
4	Du'aine Thorne-Ladejo	United Kingdom	46.66	Q
5	Paul Greene	Australia	46.71	
6	Kennedy Ochieng	Kenya	46.88	
7	Florian Hennig	East Germany	47.00	
8	Ronald Thorne	Barbados	48.11	

=== Heats ===
8 August

==== Heat 1 ====
Rank	Name	Nationality	Time	Notes
1	Chris Nelloms	United States	46.83	Q
2	Amar Hecini	Algeria	46.86	Q
3	Matthew Burmeister	Australia	47.98	
4	Yusuke Horikoshi	Japan	48.06	
5	Štefan Balošák	Czechoslovakia	48.57	
6	Alain Sierro	Switzerland	49.24	
7	Carl Casey	Antigua and Barbuda	49.40	
8	Foday Sillah	Sierra Leone	50.33	

==== Heat 2 ====
Rank	Name	Nationality	Time	Notes
1	Kennedy Ochieng	Kenya	46.98	Q
2	Ibrahim Ismail	Qatar	47.03	Q
3	Daniel England	Jamaica	47.60	q
4	Terry Harewood	Barbados	48.39	
5	Michael Börner	West Germany	48.46	
6	Julio Caballero	Paraguay	48.68	

==== Heat 3 ====
Rank	Name	Nationality	Time	Notes
1	Dmitriy Golovastov	Soviet Union	46.89	Q
2	Paul Greene	Australia	46.96	Q
3	Florian Hennig	East Germany	47.43	q
4	Ronald Thorne	Barbados	47.47	q
5	Gary Reid	Canada	47.94	
6	José Mendes	Portugal	47.99	
7	Perry Dinan	New Zealand	49.04	

==== Heat 4 ====
Rank	Name	Nationality	Time	Notes
1	Rico Lieder	East Germany	47.00	Q
2	Du'aine Thorne-Ladejo	United Kingdom	47.03	Q
2	Joseph Chepsiror Kiptanui	Kenya	47.03	Q
4	Nilton Messias	Brazil	47.73	
5	Aleksandr Angelov	Soviet Union	47.78	
6	Masayoshi Kan	Japan	48.49	

==== Heat 5 ====
Rank	Name	Nationality	Time	Notes
1	Mark Richardson	United Kingdom	46.64	Q
2	Derek Mills	United States	46.68	Q
3	Inaldo de Sena	Brazil	47.36	q
4	Mathias Rusterholz	Switzerland	47.45	q
5	Konstantin Babalievski	Bulgaria	47.74	
6	Matija Šestak	Yugoslavia	49.05	
7	Feye Girma	Ethiopia	50.21	
8	Nour Moustafa	North Yemen	54.43	

== Participation ==
According to an unofficial count, 35 athletes from 25 countries participated in the event.

- Algeria (1)
- Antigua and Barbuda (1)
- Australia (2)
- Barbados (2)
- Brazil (2)
- Bulgaria (1)
- Canada (1)
- Czechoslovakia (1)
- East Germany (2)
- Ethiopia (1)
- Jamaica (1)
- Japan (2)
- Kenya (2)
- New Zealand (1)
- North Yemen (1)
- Paraguay (1)
- Portugal (1)
- Qatar (1)
- Sierra Leone (1)
- Soviet Union (2)
- Switzerland (2)
- United Kingdom (2)
- United States (2)
- West Germany (1)
- Yugoslavia (1)
