= Amar Hecini =

Algerian sprinter

Personal information
- Nationality: Algerian
- Born: 18 November 1971 (age 54)
- Height: 1.75 m (5 ft 9 in)
- Weight: 70 kg (154 lb)

Sport
- Sport: Sprinting
- Event: 400 metres
- Club: US Biskra

Amar Hecini (Arabic: عمار الحصيني; born 18 November 1971) is a retired sprinter who specialised in the 400 metres. He represented his country at the 1996 Summer Olympics as well as at four outdoor and one indoor World Championships.

== International competitions ==
Year	Competition	Venue	Position	Event	Notes
Representing Algeria
1990	World Junior Championships	Plovdiv, Bulgaria	3rd (sf)	400 m	46.08^{1}
1991	World Indoor Championships	Seville, Spain	13th (h)	400 m	47.95
1991	Mediterranean Games	Athens, Greece	8th	200 m	47.28
1991	World Championships	Tokyo, Japan	29th (h)	400 m	47.30
1993	Mediterranean Games	Narbonne, France	5th	200 m	46.97
1993	Mediterranean Games	Narbonne, France	4th	4 × 400 m relay	3:08.03
1993	World Championships	Stuttgart, Germany	45th (h)	200 m	21.36
1993	World Championships	Stuttgart, Germany	13th (h)	4 × 400 m relay	3:03.63
1995	World Championships	Gothenburg, Sweden	30th (h)	400 m	46.64
1996	Olympic Games	Atlanta, United States	–	400 m	DQ
1997	World Championships	Athens, Greece	13th (h)	4 × 400 m relay	3:05.22

^{1}Did not finish in the final

== Personal bests ==
Outdoor

- 200 metres – 20.96 (+0.4 m/s, Narbonne 1994)
- 400 metres – 45.90 (Udine 1991)
- 800 metres – 1:44.84 (Rieti 1996)

Indoor

- 400 metres – 47.95 (Seville 1991)
