= Greg Haughton =

Jamaican sprinter (born 1973)

Personal information
- Born: 10 November 1973 (age 52) Kingston, Jamaica

Sport
- Sport: Track and field
Medal record
Men's athletics
Representing Jamaica
Olympic Games
| Silver medal – second place | 2000 Sydney | 4 × 400 m relay |
| Bronze medal – third place | 1996 Atlanta | 4 × 400 m relay |
| Bronze medal – third place | 2000 Sydney | 400 m |
World Championships
| Silver medal – second place | 1995 Gothenburg | 4 × 400 m relay |
| Silver medal – second place | 1997 Athens | 4 × 400 m relay |
| Silver medal – second place | 1999 Seville | 4 × 400 m relay |
| Silver medal – second place | 2001 Edmonton | 4 × 400 m relay |
| Bronze medal – third place | 1995 Gothenburg | 400 m |
| Bronze medal – third place | 2001 Edmonton | 400 m |
World Indoor Championships
| Gold medal – first place | 2004 Budapest | 4 × 400 m relay |
| Silver medal – second place | 1997 Paris | 4 × 400 m relay |
Pan American Games
| Gold medal – first place | 1999 Winnipeg | 400 m |
| Gold medal – first place | 1999 Winnipeg | 4 × 400 m relay |
Commonwealth Games
| Gold medal – first place | 1998 Kuala Lumpur | 4 × 400 m relay |
Central American and Caribbean Games
| Silver medal – second place | 1998 Maracaibo | 4 × 400 m relay |
CAC Championships
| Gold medal – first place | 1993 Cali | 400 m |
| Gold medal – first place | 1993 Cali | 4 × 400 m relay |
Goodwill Games
| Gold medal – first place | 2001 Brisbane | 400 m |
World Junior Championships
| Silver medal – second place | 1992 Seoul | 4 × 400 m relay |
CARIFTA Games Junior (U20)
| Gold medal – first place | 1992 Nassau | 400 m |

Gregory Haughton (born 10 November 1973) is a Jamaican 400 metres runner. He won three Olympic medals, one at the 1996 Summer Olympics and two at the 2000 Summer Olympics. His personal best for the 400 m was 44.56 seconds.

He was coached by Clyde Hart, an individual who also trained world record-holder Michael Johnson. Individually, Haughton was the bronze medallist at the 2000 Sydney Olympics and won bronze medals over 400 m at the World Championships in Athletics in 1995 and 2001. He won gold medals at the 2001 Goodwill Games, 1999 Pan American Games, 1993 Central American and Caribbean Championships in Athletics. He was twice NJCAA Champion and a three-time NCAA 400 metres champion. He won five Jamaican national titles in his career.

As a long-standing member of Jamaica's 4 × 400 metres relay team, Haughton was crowned 2004 World Indoor Champion, 1998 Commonwealth Champion, 1999 Pan American Games champion. He won Olympic bronze medals in the relay in 2000 and 1996, as well as four silver medals at the World Championships.

Haughton was inducted into the Virginia Sports Hall of Fame (1997), George Mason University Hall of Fame (2001), and the Carreras Sports Foundation Male Athlete of the Year (1999–2000). In April 2011 Greg Haughton received the award from the Inter-Secondary Schools Sports Association for Outstanding Contribution to Track and Field in Jamaica.

== Personal bests ==
| Date | Event | Venue | Time |
|---|---|---|---|
| 19 May 1996 | 200 metres | Fairfax, Virginia | 20.64 |
| 9 August 1995 | 400 metres | Gothenburg, Sweden | 44.56 |

== Achievements ==
| Year | Competition | Venue | Position | Event | Notes |
Representing Jamaica
| 1992 | World Junior Championships | Seoul, South Korea | 15th (h) | 400 m | 47.73 |
| 1992 | World Junior Championships | Seoul, South Korea | 2nd | 4 × 400 m relay | 3:06.58 |
| 1993 | Central American and Caribbean Championships | Cali, Colombia | 1st | 400 m | 45.35 |
| 1993 | Central American and Caribbean Championships | Cali, Colombia | 1st | 4 × 400 m relay | 3:02.57 |
| 1993 | World Championships | Stuttgart, Germany | 6th | 400 m | 45.63 |
| 1993 | World Championships | Stuttgart, Germany | 7th | 4 × 400 m relay | 3:01.44 |
| 1995 | World Championships | Gothenburg, Sweden | 3rd | 400 m | 44.56 |
| 1995 | World Championships | Gothenburg, Sweden | 2nd | 4 × 400 m relay | 2:59.88 |
| 1996 | Summer Olympics | Atlanta, United States | 3rd | 4 × 400 m relay | 2:59.42 |
| 1997 | World Championships | Athens, Greece | 2nd | 4 × 400 m relay | 2:56.75 |
| 1997 | World Indoor Championships | Paris, France | 2nd | 4 × 400 m relay | 3:08.11 |
| 1998 | Central American and Caribbean Games | Maracaibo, Venezuela | 2nd | 4 × 400 m relay | 3:03.26 |
| 1998 | Commonwealth Games | Kuala Lumpur, Malaysia | 1st | 4 × 400 m relay | 2:59.03 |
| 1999 | Pan American Games | Winnipeg, Manitoba | 1st | 400 m | 44.59 |
| 1999 | Pan American Games | Winnipeg, Manitoba | 1st | 4 × 400 m relay | 2:57.97 |
| 1999 | World Championships | Sevilla, Spain | 5th | 400 m | 45.07 |
| 1999 | World Championships | Sevilla, Spain | 2nd | 4 × 400 m relay | 2:59.34 |
| 2000 | IAAF Grand Prix Final | Doha, Qatar | 3rd | 400 m | 45.85 |
| 2000 | Summer Olympics | Sydney, Australia | 3rd | 400 m | 44.70 |
| 2000 | Summer Olympics | Sydney, Australia | 2nd | 4 × 400 m relay | 2:58.78 |
| 2001 | World Championships | Edmonton, Alberta | 3rd | 400 m | 44.98 |
| 2001 | World Championships | Edmonton, Alberta | 2nd | 4 × 400 m relay | 2:58.39 |
| 2002 | IAAF Grand Prix Final | Paris, France | 2nd | 400 m | 44.87 |
| 2004 | World Indoor Championships | Budapest, Hungary | 1st | 4 × 400 m relay | 3:05.21 |
