= Iwan Thomas =

British sprinter (born 1974)

Iwan Thomas MBE
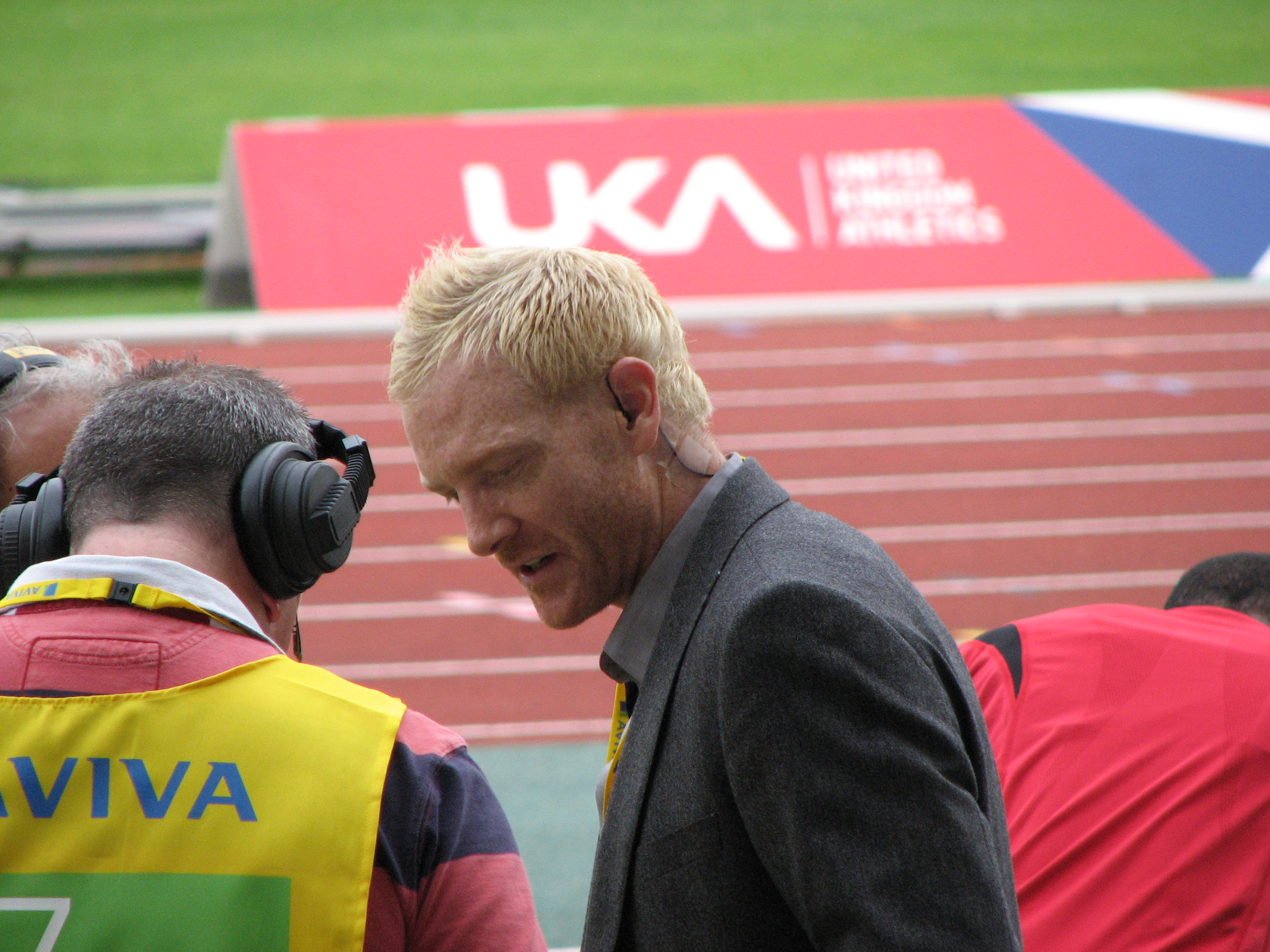
- Thomas being interviewed in London in 2011

Personal information
- Born: Iwan Gwyn Thomas; 5 January 1974 (age 52) Farnborough, Hampshire, England

Sport
- Sport: Men's athletics
- Event: 400m
- Club: Newham and Essex Beagles
Medal record
Men's athletics
Representing Great Britain
Olympic Games
Silver medal – second place	1996 Atlanta	4 × 400 m relay
World Championships
Gold medal – first place	1997 Athens	4 × 400 m relay
European Championships
Gold medal – first place	1998 Budapest	400 m
Gold medal – first place	1998 Budapest	4 × 400 m relay
European Cup
Gold medal – first place	1995 Villeneuve d'Ascq	4 × 400 m relay
Gold medal – first place	1997 Munich	4 × 400 m relay
IAAF World Cup
Gold medal – first place	1998 Johannesburg	400 m
Silver medal – second place	1998 Johannesburg	4 × 400 m
Representing Wales
Commonwealth Games
Gold medal – first place	1998 Kuala Lumpur	400 m
Silver medal – second place	2002 Manchester	4 × 400 m
Bronze medal – third place	1998 Kuala Lumpur	4 × 400 m

Iwan Gwyn Thomas MBE (born 5 January 1974) is a Welsh sprinter who represented Great Britain at the Olympic Games in the 400 metres, and Wales at the Commonwealth Games. Thomas is a former European, Commonwealth Games and World 4 × 400 metres relay champion.

Thomas is the former UK 400 m record holder, with his time of 44.36s set in Birmingham on 13 July 1997 standing until Matthew Hudson-Smith broke the record in May 2022. He was also a member of the team which held the European 4 × 400 m relay record of 2:56.60, set in Atlanta, USA in the Olympic final on 3 August 1996 until it was broken at the 2024 Summer Olympics.

Thomas's coach for much of his running career was Mike Smith, who was also formerly coach to British 400 m runners Roger Black, Todd Bennett, Paul Harmsworth and 400 m hurdler Kriss Akabusi. Smith died in 2017. Thomas was made a Member of the Order of the British Empire (MBE) in 1998.

== Athletics career ==
His initial athletics breakthrough came at the World Junior Championships in 1992 as part of the British 4 × 400 metres relay team that finished fifth. Thomas attended Stamford School and West London Institute of Higher Education, where he studied Sports Science and Geography. While still at university, he took part in the 1994 Commonwealth Games 400 m where he reached the semi-finals, representing Wales. From there, he was selected to represent Britain in the relay at the 1995 European Cup and secured his first championship gold medal.

At the 1996 Olympic Games in Atlanta, Thomas finished fifth in the final and took a silver medal in the 4 × 400 m event (in which the team broke the European record, which stood until 2024). He also represented Britain in the 2000 Olympics but was not selected for the individual event and despite running the fastest leg for the British team in the 4 × 400 m relay, did not secure a medal (the team took 5th place in the final).

Thomas was a member of the Great Britain 4 × 400 m team at the 1997 World Championships in Athens. The team (Iwan Thomas, Roger Black, Jamie Baulch and Mark Richardson) finished second by 0.18 seconds to the United States. However, in 2008, US team member Antonio Pettigrew, who ran the second leg of the final, testified in the court case against trainer Trevor Graham that he had been aided by performance- enhancing substances between 1997 and 2001, including the 1997 World Championships. As the International Amateur Athletics Federation did not, as of 2008, change results retrospectively more than eight years after the event, initially the GB team was not awarded the gold medal retrospectively, although Pettigrew had returned his medals won in that period.

Thomas' career was hampered by injury including a stress fracture to his ankle in 1999 that required telescopic surgery. He was again injured in 2003 with damage to his Achilles. Further injury in 2004 ruled him out of the 2004 Olympic Games. Thomas was selected in 2006 for the Welsh team for the 2006 Commonwealth Games in Melbourne, Australia, but was unable to compete due to an injury.

On 7 January 2010 it was announced that Great Britain's 1997 World Championship 4 × 400 m relay team were to be awarded the gold medal they were denied by the disqualified USA team. New medals were minted for the ceremony, as not all of the American quartet returned the originals. Thomas received his gold medal in May 2010 in a presentation by Alun Ffred Jones at Cardiff Bay. The team eventually had a ceremony to celebrate winning gold in July 2025.

Iwan never officially retired from athletics but took the opportunity to do so when offered by Andy Goldstein on 3 July 2012 edition of the Andy Goldstein's Sports Bar on Talksport. He remained the UK record-holder in the 4 × 400 m relay until it was broken at the 2024 Summer Olympics.

== Personal life ==
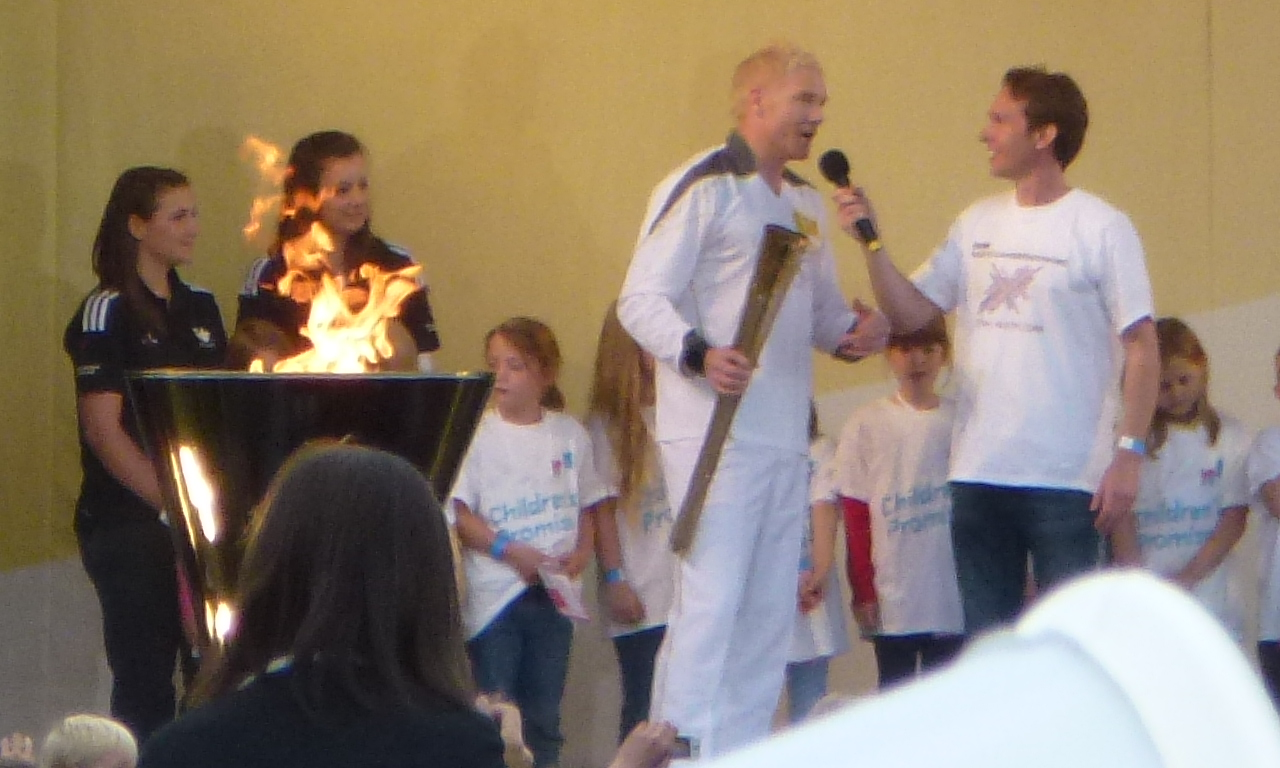
Iwan Thomas being interviewed after lighting the Olympic cauldron in Cambridge during the 2012 Summer Olympics torch relay.

His father was born to Welsh-born parents in Middlesex, whilst his mother's Welsh language speaking family were centred around the village of Llandderfel, Gwynedd. Iwan Thomas was born in Farnborough, Hampshire, but was raised in Godmanchester in Cambridgeshire and attended Hinchingbrooke School in nearby Huntingdon. As of 2015, he lives near Southampton.

After winning Deadline, he bought himself a Ducati 1098 motorcycle. Although a lifelong supporter of Tottenham Hotspur Football Club, in 2010 he became an ambassador for The Saints Foundation, the charity of Southampton F.C.

== Television work ==
In 2008, Thomas guest presented two episodes of Best of Friends, in the sports special with Darren Campbell and in the activities special with Zoe Salmon.

Iwan took part in the celebrity games of the Million Pound Drop Live broadcast on Friday 10 August 2012.

Thomas is co-presenter of MotoGP Tonight on BT Sport alongside Craig Doyle. He can also be seen presenting the Chequered Flag show immediately following MotoGP races.

On 27 August 2015, Thomas was announced as a contestant in the 2015 series of Strictly Come Dancing. On 5 September 2015 it was announced Thomas had been paired with professional dancer Ola Jordan for the series. He was the first contestant to be eliminated.

In September 2016, Thomas was a presenter of the Paralympics Games in Rio for Channel 4 where he commentated on the athletics coverage presented from the Olympic Stadium.

In February 2017, Thomas was a guest at "dictionary corner" on Countdown, on Channel 4.

In 2022, Thomas took part in Celebrity Hunted for stand up to cancer. He was the only celebrity to win that series, with his teammate Richard Whitehead being caught earlier when a taunt against the Hunters backfired.

== Other activities ==
Thomas made a guest appearance as a cyclist at the final round of the 2008-09 Revolution series at Manchester Velodrome, competing in the 200 m time trial.

Thomas took part in the London Marathon 2015.

Thomas joined the Ecover Sailing Team in 2009 as part of an Extreme 40 event. He was the fifth man on their boat on 31 July, racing catamarans around Egypt Point in Cowes, for a practice day of the iShares cup.

Thomas, a keen motorcyclist, became a co-host of a new motorbike podcast called Full Chat in April 2024. Teaming up with former professional footballer David Prutton, the pair discuss all things two wheels and welcome a host of celebrity guests on the show.
