= Frank Bennett Fiske =

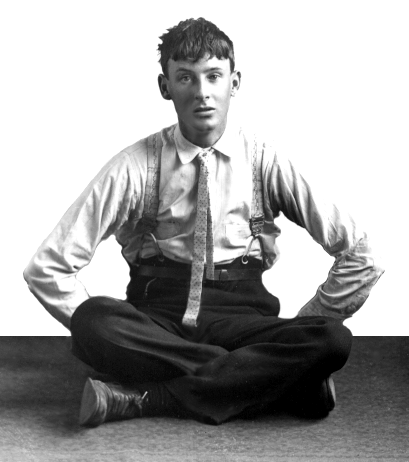
- Self-portrait circa 1903
- Born: Frank Bennett Fiske; June 11, 1883; Fort Bennett, Dakota Territory, United States
- Died: July 18, 1952 (aged 69); Bismarck, North Dakota, United States
- Occupations: Photographer, journalist
- Spouse: Angela Cournoyer (1883–1974)
- Children: Francine Louise Fiske (1921–1983)
- Parent(s): Mary Louise Otter (1858–1945); George Edward Fiske (1855–1927)

Frank Bennett Fiske (June 11, 1883 – July 18, 1952) was an early-20th-century photographer primarily active among the Lakota (Sioux) on Standing Rock Indian Reservation in North and South Dakota.

== Early life and education ==
Fiske was born June 11, 1883, at Fort Bennett in Dakota Territory, son of George E. Fiske, a soldier at the post, and of Louise, née Otter. The elder Fiske originally hailed from Baltimore MD, had been trained as an artist working as a set painter in theatres, spending some time at sea traveling multiple times to South America and enlisting in the early 1870s into the US military, first getting posted to Arizona Territory and later to Fort Sully and Fort Bennett in Dakota Territory. Soon after Frank's birth, his father resigned from the military to take up ranching on a claim approx. 60 miles north of Pierre. By 1888, on account of the persisting drought, the Fiskes gave up ranching and removed to Fort Yates, North Dakota, on Standing Rock Indian Reservation, where the elder Fiske found work as a wagon master. Frank attended school at Fort Yates and the local boarding school with Indian children between 1890 and 1900.

== Career ==
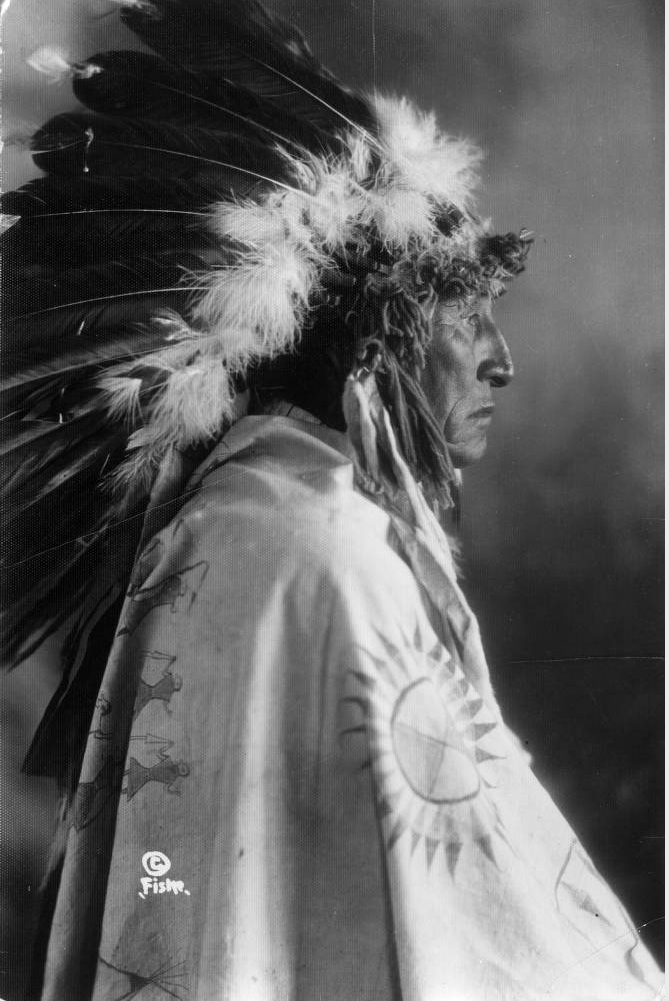
Red Tomahawk, profile, post card by Frank Bennett Fiske 1910

North Dakota blank

Fiske was apprenticed to Stephen T. Fansler, the post photographer at Fort Yates. When Fansler abandoned the studio in 1900, Fiske took over, aged 17, following into the footsteps of his illustrious predecessors, the legendary photographers Orlando Scott Goff and David Francis Barry. He continued to operate his studio, primarily at Fort Yates, until his death in 1952. Around the same time at the turn of the century, Frank's parents moved to a ranch near Fort Rice. Having grown up among the Lakota people of Standing Rock Indian Reservation Frank developed a great interest and admiration about the Sioux nation, their history and culture documenting many aspects of their lives through his photography. He was fascinated listening to the stories of the old warriors. In 1917 he published his first book "The Taming of the Sioux". In 1918 Fiske enlisted in the army and briefly served in World War I, albeit he was not sent overseas. The following year, on his birthday he married Angela Cournoyer, a direct descendant of chief Forked Horn and fur trader Joseph Picotte. In 1921, their only daughter Francine was born. In 1933 Fiske published his second book, "Life and Death of Sitting Bull". Among Fiske's photographs is one of Red Tomahawk, Sitting Bull’s assassin, which later was reproduced and now is on North Dakota highway markers.

== Later life ==
In 1950 Fiske received the North Dakota Art Award for his lifetime achievement as a photographer, earning recognition for his Indian portraits by the State American Art Week Committee. Frank Fiske died aged 69 of heart failure at the Bismarck Hospital on July 18, 1952. He was interred next to his parents at St. Peter's Catholic Church cemetery at Fort Yates, ND Some time after Fiske’s death a large portion of his Indian photographs were deposited with the State Historical Society of North Dakota and over time became the property of that institution.
