= Danny McFarlane =

Jamaican hurdler (born 1972)

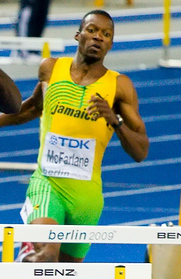
- McFarlane in 2009

Personal information
- Born: 14 June 1972 (age 54) Saint Mary Parish, Jamaica

Sport
- Sport: Track and field
Medal record
Men's athletics
Representing Jamaica
Olympic Games
Silver medal – second place	2000 Sydney	4x400 m relay
Silver medal – second place	2004 Athens	400 m hurdles
World Championships
Silver medal – second place	1995 Gothenburg	4x400 m relay
Silver medal – second place	1997 Athens	4x400 m relay
Silver medal – second place	1999 Sevilla	4x400 m relay
Silver medal – second place	2001 Edmonton	4x400 m relay
Silver medal – second place	2003 Paris	4x400 m relay
World Indoor Championships
Gold medal – first place	2003 Birmingham	4x400 m relay
Bronze medal – third place	2001 Lisbon	400 m
Bronze medal – third place	2001 Lisbon	4x400 m relay
Pan American Games
Gold medal – first place	1999 Winnipeg	4x400 m relay
Summer Universiade
Bronze medal – third place	1993 Buffalo	400m

Danny D. McFarlane, OD (born 14 June 1972) is a Jamaican hurdler, who has won numerous international medals in individual and relay contests. Having won five medals at the World Championships in Athletics and an Olympic bronze medal with the Jamaican 4 x 400 metres team, McFarlane has also won in individual competition: he took an Olympic silver medal in the 400 metres hurdles at the 2004 Athens Olympics. He competed collegiately for the University of Oklahoma. At Oklahoma, McFarlane won the 1997 4 × 400 meter relay at the NCAA Division I Outdoor Track and Field Championships.

In the 2009 World Championships in Athletics, he equalled Tim Berrett's record for most appearances at the competition, having competed in every Championships since 1993.

== 2009 ==
The veteran sprinter gained qualification to the 2009 World Championships in Athletics with a run of 48.54 seconds in the 400 metres hurdles at the Jamaican national championships, taking second behind Isa Phillips.

== Personal bests ==
- 400 metres hurdles – 48.00 (2004)
- 400 metres – 44.90 (1995)

== Major achievements ==
Year	Tournament	Venue	Result	Extra
1997	World Championships	Athens, Greece	3rd	4 × 400 m relay
1999	World Championships	Seville, Spain	2nd	4 × 400 m relay
1999	Pan American Games	Winnipeg, Canada	1st	4 × 400 m relay
2000	Summer Olympics	Sydney, Australia	3rd	4 × 400 m relay
2001	Central American and Caribbean Championships	Guatemala City, Guatemala	1st	400 metres
2001	World Indoor Championships	Lisbon, Portugal	3rd	400 metres
2001	World Indoor Championships	Lisbon, Portugal	3rd	4 × 400 m relay
2001	World Championships	Edmonton, Canada	2nd	4 × 400 m relay
2003	World Indoor Championships	Birmingham, England	1st	4 × 400 m relay
2003	World Championships	Paris, France	2nd	4 × 400 m relay
2003	World Athletics Final	Monte Carlo, Monaco	3rd	400m hurdles
2004	Summer Olympics	Athens, Greece	2nd	400m hurdles
2008	Reebok Grand Prix	NY, United States	2nd	400m hurdles
