= Benjamin Youla =

Congolese athlete

Personal information
- Born: 12 November 1975 (age 50)
- Education: Huston–Tillotson University

Sport
- Sport: Athletics
- Event: 400 metres

Benjamin Youla (born 12 November 1975) is a retired sprinter from Republic of the Congo who specialised in the 400 metres. He represented his country at the 2000 Summer Olympics as well as two World Championships.

His personal bests in the event are 45.74 seconds outdoors (Fairfax 2001) and 49.15 seconds indoors (Houston 2004). Both are standing national record.

== International competitions ==
Year	Competition	Venue	Position	Event	Notes
Representing the Republic of the Congo
1997	World Championships	Athens, Greece	26th (qf)	400 m	46.29
1999	All-Africa Games	Johannesburg, South Africa	25th (h)	400 m	50.33
2000	Olympic Games	Sydney, Australia	61st (h)	400 m	47.54
2001	Jeux de la Francophonie	Ottawa, Canada	5th	400 m	46.44
2001	World Championships	Edmonton, Canada	23rd (h)	400 m	45.92
