= Rampa Mosveu =

Motswana sprinter

Personal information
- Nationality: Botswana
- Born: 6 June 1975 (age 51)

Sport
- Sport: Sprinting
- Event: 4 × 400 metres relay

Rampa Mosveu (born 6 June 1975) is a Motswana sprinter. He competed in the men's 4 × 400 metres relay at the 1996 Summer Olympics.
