= 1998 IAAF World Cup =

- Dates: 11–13 September 1998
- Host city: Johannesburg, South Africa
- Venue: Johannesburg Stadium
- Events: 39
- Participation: ? athletes

The 8th IAAF World Cup in Athletics were held 11–13 September 1998 at the Johannesburg Stadium in Johannesburg, South Africa.

== Overall results ==
=== Men ===
Pos.	Team	Result
1	Africa	110
2	Europe	109
3	Germany	102
4	Americas	97
5	United States	94
6	Great Britain	89
7	Asia	64
8	Oceania	53

=== Women ===
Pos.	Team	Result
1	United States	96
2	Europe	94
3	Africa	88
4	Russia	87
5	Americas	81
6	Germany	75
7	Asia	45
8	Oceania	42

== Medal summary ==
=== Men ===
Event	Gold		Silver		Bronze	
100 metres	Obadele Thompson (BAR); Americas	9.87 (NR)	Seun Ogunkoya (NGR); Africa	9.92	Dwain Chambers (GBR); Great Britain	10.03
200 metres	Frankie Fredericks (NAM); Africa	19.97	Gentry Bradley (USA); United States	20.38	Troy Douglas (NED); Europe	20.40
400 metres	Iwan Thomas (GBR); Great Britain	45.33	Jerome Young (USA); United States	45.37	Troy McIntosh (BAH); Americas	45.45
800 metres	Nils Schumann (GER); Germany	1:48.66	Mark Everett (USA); United States	1:48.73	Norberto Téllez (CUB); Americas	1:48.92
1500 metres	Laban Rotich (KEN)} Africa	3:40.87	Rui Silva (POR); Europe	3:40.95	Anthony Whiteman (GBR); Great Britain	3:40.99
3000 metres	Dieter Baumann (GER)} Germany	7:56.24	Isaac Viciosa (ESP); Europe	7:56.47	Tom Nyariki (KEN); Africa	7:59.46
5000 metres	Daniel Komen (KEN); Africa	13:46.57	Shaun Creighton (AUS); Oceania	13:53.66	Dieter Baumann (GER)} Germany	13:58.40
110 metre hurdles	Falk Balzer (GER); Germany	13.10	Colin Jackson (GBR); Great Britain	13.11	Anier García (CUB); Americas	13.14
400 metre hurdles	Samuel Matete (ZAM); Africa	48.08	Mubarak Al-Nubi (QAT); Asia	48.17	Dinsdale Morgan (JAM); Americas	48.40
3000 metre steeplechase	Damian Kallabis (GER); Germany	8:31.25	Bernard Barmasai (KEN); Africa	8:31.85	Saad Shaddad Al-Asmari (KSA); Asia	8:39.69
4 × 100 metre relay	Great Britain; Allyn Condon; Marlon Devonish; Julian Golding; Dwain Chambers	38.09	United States; Jonathan Carter; Curtis Perry; Allen Johnson; Tim Harden	38.25	Africa; Seun Ogunkoya; Leonard Myles-Mills; Frankie Fredericks; Eric Nkansah	38.29
4 × 400 metre relay	Great Britain; Mark Hylton; Jamie Baulch; Sean Baldock; Iwan Thomas	2:59.71^{1}	Americas; Michael McDonald; Troy McIntosh; Alejandro Cárdenas; Roxbert Martin	2:59.77	Africa; Clement Chukwu; Ibrahima Wade; Arnaud Malherbe; Davis Kamoga	3:03.26
High jump	Charles Austin (USA); United States	2.31	Javier Sotomayor (CUB); Americas	2.28	Sergey Klyugin (RUS); Europe	2.28
Pole vault	Maksim Tarasov (RUS); Europe	5.85	Tim Lobinger (GER); Germany	5.80	Jeff Hartwig (USA); United States	5.70
Long jump	Iván Pedroso (CUB); Americas	8.37	Jai Taurima (AUS); Oceania	8.32	Hatem Mersal (EGY); Africa	8.26
Triple jump	Charles Friedek (GER); Germany	17.42	Denis Kapustin (RUS); Europe	17.32	Yoelbi Quesada (CUB); Americas	17.25
Shot put	John Godina (USA); United States	21.48	Oleksandr Bagach (UKR); Europe	20.45	Oliver-Sven Buder (GER); Germany	20.42
Discus throw	Virgilijus Alekna (LTU); Europe	69.66	Lars Riedel (GER); Germany	67.47	Frantz Kruger (RSA); Africa	65.73
Hammer throw	Tibor Gécsek (HUN); Europe	82.68	Heinz Weis (GER); Germany	80.13	Andrey Abduvaliyev (UZB); Asia	79.40
Javelin throw	Steve Backley (GBR); Great Britain	88.71	Sergey Makarov (RUS); Europe	86.96	Raymond Hecht (GER); Germany	84.92

^{1} The United States originally won this event in 2:59.28, but were disqualified in 2009 after Antonio Pettigrew admitted to using HGH and EPO between 1997 and 2003.

=== Women ===
Event	Gold		Silver		Bronze	
100 metres	Marion Jones (USA); United States	10.65	Chandra Sturrup (BAH); Americas	10.97	Mary Onyali (NGR); Africa	11.05
200 metres	Marion Jones (USA); United States	21.62	Falilat Ogunkoya (NGR); Africa	22.25	Zhanna Pintusevich (UKR); Europe	22.35
400 metres	Falilat Ogunkoya (NGR); Africa	49.52	Grit Breuer (GER); Germany	49.86	Sandie Richards (JAM); Americas	50.33
800 metres	Maria Mutola (MOZ); Africa	1:59.88	Yelena Afanasyeva (RUS); Russia	2:00.20	Letitia Vriesde (SUR); Americas	2:00.56
1500 metres	Svetlana Masterkova (RUS); Russia	4:09.41	Jackline Maranga (KEN); Africa	4:10.30	Carla Sacramento (POR); Europe	4:11.66
3000 metres	Gabriela Szabo (ROU); Europe	9:00.54	Zahra Ouaziz (MAR); Africa	9:01.35	Regina Jacobs (USA); United States	9:11.15
5000 metres	Sonia O'Sullivan (IRL); Europe	16:24.52	Regina Jacobs (USA); United States	16:26.24	Berhane Adere (ETH); Africa	16:38.81
100 metre hurdles	Glory Alozie (NGR); Africa	12.58	Angie Vaughn (USA); United States	12.67	Irina Korotya (RUS); Russia	12.77
400 metre hurdles	Nezha Bidouane (MAR); Africa	52.96	Deon Hemmings (JAM); Americas	53.03	Kim Batten (USA); United States	53.17
4 × 100 metre relay	United States; Cheryl Taplin; Chryste Gaines; Inger Miller; Carlette Guidry	42.00	Americas; Tayna Lawrence; Chandra Sturrup; Beverly McDonald; Philomena Mensah	42.44	Germany; Melanie Paschke; Gabi Rockmeier; Birgit Rockmeier; Andrea Philipp	42.81
4 × 400 metre relay	Germany; Anke Feller; Uta Rohländer; Ulrike Urbansky; Grit Breuer	3:24.26	Americas; Norfalia Carabalí; Deon Hemmings; Andrea Blackett; Sandie Richards	3:24.39	Russia; Natalya Khrushcheleva; Svetlana Goncharenko; Yekaterina Bakhvalova; Olga Kotlyarova	3:25.15
High jump	Monica Dinescu (ROU); Europe	1.98	Hestrie Storbeck (RSA); Africa	1.96	Tisha Waller (USA); United States	1.93
Long jump	Heike Drechsler (GER); Germany	7.07	Marion Jones (USA); United States	7.00	Guan Yingnan (CHN); Asia	6.74
Triple jump	Olga Vasdeki (GRE); Europe	14.64	Tatyana Lebedeva (RUS); Russia	14.36	Yamilé Aldama (CUB); Americas	14.29
Shot put	Vita Pavlysh (UKR); Europe	20.59	Irina Korzhanenko (RUS); Russia	19.04	Connie Price-Smith (USA); United States	18.79
Discus throw	Franka Dietzsch (GER); Germany	67.07	Nicoleta Grasu (ROU); Europe	66.25	Natalya Sadova (RUS); Russia	64.38
Javelin throw	Joanna Stone (AUS); Oceania	69.85	Sonia Bisset (CUB); Americas	65.50	Mikaela Ingberg (FIN); Europe	64.24
