= Jerome Davis (sprinter) =

American sprinter

Personal information
- Nationality: American
- Born: August 22, 1977 (age 49) Ridgecrest, California, U.S.
- Height: 6 ft 2 in (1.88 m)
- Weight: 178 lb (81 kg)

Sport
- Sport: Track and field
- Events: 200 metres, 400 metres
- College team: USC Trojans
- Coached by: John Henry Johnson

Achievements and titles
- Personal bests: 200 m: 20.51 (Westwood, Los Angeles, California 1998); 400 m: 44.51 (Sevilla 1999)
Medal record
Men's Athletics
Representing the United States
Summer Universiade
Gold medal – first place	1997 Catania	4x400 m relay
Gold medal – first place	1999 Palma de Mallorca	400 m
Gold medal – first place	1999 Palma de Mallorca	4x400 m relay
Silver medal – second place	1997 Catania	400 m
World Junior Championships
Gold medal – first place	1996 Sydney	4×100 m relay
Gold medal – first place	1996 Sydney	4×400 m relay
Silver medal – second place	1996 Sydney	400 m

Jerome Davis (born August 22, 1977) is an American former sprinter. He attended college at the University of Southern California, and was the Pacific-10 Conference champion in the men's 400m dash four consecutive years from 1996 through 1999. As a sophomore, Davis finished third at the 1997 NCAA men's Outdoor Track & Field Championships with a time of 45.36 In 1998, he won the NCAA Men's Outdoor Track & Field National Championship in the 400m event with a time of 45.18. Despite improving his time in the NCAA championships the following year, Davis finished third again, being edged out by LSU's Derrick Brew by 2 one-hundredths of a second for second place. At the 1999 Summer Universiade, Davis took gold, with a time of 44.91. He was on the gold medal-winning USA men's 400m World Championship relay team in 1999. The victory was vacated in 2008 when a teammate confessed to using performance-enhancing drugs during that time.
