= Marc Alexander Scheer =

German sprinter (born 1979)

Marc Alexander Scheer (born 16 May 1979) is a German sprinter who specializes in the 400 metres.

He finished fourth at the 1998 World Junior Championships. In 4 × 400 metres relay he finished fifth at the 1998 World Cup and eighth at the 2001 World Championships.
