= Jens Dautzenberg =

German sprinter (born 1974)

Personal information
- Born: 24 May 1974 (age 52) Aachen, West Germany

Sport
- Sport: Track and field

Jens Dautzenberg (born 24 May 1974) is a former German sprinter who specialised in the 400 metres.

He competed on the German 4 × 400 metres relay team in two editions of the IAAF World Cup. In 1998 he finished fifth with teammates Klaus Ehmsperger, Marc Alexander Scheer and Nils Schumann and in 2002 he finished sixth with teammates Ingo Schultz, Ruwen Faller and Lars Figura.

His personal best time is 45.97 seconds, achieved in June 1997 in Cottbus.
