= Jopie van Oudtshoorn =

South African sprinter

Personal information
- Born: 5 February 1976 (age 50)
Medal record
Men's Athletics
Representing South Africa
World Championships
Bronze medal – third place	1999 Seville	4x400 m relay
Universiade
Bronze medal – third place	1999 Palma de Mallorca	400 metres

Jopie van Oudtshoorn (born 5 February 1976) is a South African sprinter who specializes in the 400 metres.

His personal best time is 44.75 seconds, achieved in April 1999 in Germiston. Together with Hendrick Mokganyetsi, Adriaan Botha and Arnaud Malherbe he holds the South African record in 4 x 400 metres relay with 3:00.20 minutes, achieved at the 1999 World Championships in Seville where South Africa finished fourth. The team was subsequently awarded bronze medals for a third place in the same race, following a positive drugs test in the US team. van Oudtshoorn also ran for the South African team that finished fourth at the 2002 Commonwealth Games.

On the individual level, van Oudtshoorn won a bronze medal at the 1999 Summer Universiade in the 400 metres.
