= Ibrahima Wade =

French sprinter

Medal record

Men's athletics

Representing Senegal

African Championships
Gold medal – first place	1996 Yaoundé	400 m
Gold medal – first place	1998 Dakar	4×400 m
Bronze medal – third place	1998 Dakar	400 m

Representing France

European Championships
Bronze medal – third place	2002 Munich	4×400 m

Ibrahima Wade (born 6 September 1968) is a French sprinter who specializes in the 400 metres. He switched nationality from his birth country Senegal in 2000.

His personal best time is 45.05 seconds, achieved in August 1998 in Dakar. With 45.76 seconds from July 2004, he held the Masters M35 World record. The record has been improved upon twice since, by Alvin Harrison (DOM) with a 45.68 in 2009 and by Chris Brown (BAH), with a 44.59 in 2014. but neither of those marks have yet been ratified by World Masters Athletics, so Wade's mark still stands as the official record.

He reached the semi-finals of the World Championships in 1997 and 1999.

== Achievements ==
Year	Tournament	Venue	Result	Extra
1996	African Championships	Yaoundé, Cameroon	1st	400 m
1997	Jeux de la Francophonie	Antananarivo, Madagascar	1st	400 m
1998	African Championships	Dakar, Senegal	3rd	400 m
1999	World Championships	Seville, Spain	8th	4 × 400 m relay
1999	Military World Games	Zagreb, Croatia	1st	400 m
2000	Olympic Games	Sydney, Australia	4th	4 × 400 m relay
2002	European Championships	Munich, Germany	3rd	4 × 400 m relay
