= Hendrick Mokganyetsi =

South African sprinter

Medal record

Men's athletics

Representing South Africa

African Championships
Bronze medal – third place	2004 Brazzaville	4×400 m

Mokganyetsi in 2000

Hendrick Mokganyetsi (born 7 September 1975 in Pretoria) is a South African sprinter who specializes in the 400 meters.

His personal best time is 44.59 seconds, achieved in September 2000 in Yokohama. He also has a strong personal best in the 800 meters, 1:44.62 minutes from 1997. Together with Jopie van Oudtshoorn, Adriaan Botha and Arnaud Malherbe he holds the South African record in 4 × 400 meters relay with 3:00.20 minutes, achieved at the 1999 World Championships in Seville where South Africa finished fourth (later third). The South African relay team broke their own record of 3:00.26 min, achieved when they finished in fifth place at the 1997 World Championships.

On the individual level he finished sixth at the 2000 Summer Olympics in Sydney.
