= Brad Jamieson =

Australian sprinter

Personal information
- Born: 16 March 1978 (age 48) Adelaide, Australia

Sport
- Sport: Track and field

Brad Scott Jamieson (born 16 March 1978) is an Australian former sprinter who competed in the 2000 Summer Olympics. He also won the Bay Sheffield in 1998.
