= Antonio Pettigrew =

American sprinter

Personal information
- Born: November 3, 1967 Macon, Georgia, U.S.
- Died: August 10, 2010 (aged 42) Chatham County, North Carolina, U.S.
- Height: 1.83 m (6 ft 0 in)

Sport
- Country: United States
- Event: Athletics

Achievements and titles
- Personal best: see Personal bests
Medal record
Men's Athletics
Representing the United States
Olympic Games
Disqualified	2000 Sydney	4 × 400 m relay
World Championships
Gold medal – first place	1991 Tokyo	400 m
Silver medal – second place	1991 Tokyo	4 × 400 m relay
Disqualified	1997 Athens	4 × 400 m relay
Disqualified	1999 Seville	4 × 400 m relay
Disqualified	2001 Edmonton	4 × 400 m relay

Antonio Pettigrew (November 3, 1967 – August 10, 2010) was an American sprinter who specialized in the 400 meters.

== Early life and career ==
Pettigrew was born in Macon, Georgia.

While attending St. Augustine's College in Raleigh, North Carolina, Pettigrew was a four-time NCAA Division II champion in the 400 meter race. He came to prominence at the 1991 World Championships, where he won the 400 m gold medal and a silver medal in the 4 × 400 meters relay.

At the 2000 Summer Olympics in Sydney, Pettigrew threw his gold medal-winning Adidas spikes into the crowd after winning the 4 × 400 m final for the USA.

== Controversies ==
In 2008, prosecution documents related to the trial of coach Trevor Graham listed Pettigrew as one of Graham's athletes to have used performance-enhancing drugs. Pettigrew then admitted to using performance-enhancing drugs and testified against Graham at his trial in May 2008.

Although the IAAF rules currently do not retroactively alter results more than eight years after the event, Pettigrew voluntarily returned the medals he won in that period. The 2000 Sydney Olympics 4 × 400 m U.S. relay team was stripped of their medals after Pettigrew admitted that he had used performance-enhancing drugs during that time.

He received a two-year athletics ban in 2008, even though he had already retired from competitive track by then.

== Death ==
Pettigrew was found dead at age 42 in the back seat of his locked car in Chatham County, North Carolina, on August 10, 2010, and evidence of sleeping pills was found by police. On October 13, an autopsy report stated that he had died by suicide as a result of overdosing on a medication containing diphenhydramine. Pettigrew was an assistant coach at the University of North Carolina at the time of his death.

== Personal bests ==
Event	Time (seconds)	Venue	Date
100 meters	10.42	Raleigh, North Carolina, United States	March 26, 1994
200 meters	20.38	Durham, North Carolina, United States	April 9, 1994
300 meters	32.33	Jerez de la Frontera, Spain	September 13, 1989
400 meters	44.27	Houston, Texas, United States	June 17, 1989

- Main information from IAAF Profile.
- Record information from All-Athletics.com.

== See also ==
- BALCO Scandal
- List of sportspeople sanctioned for doping offences
