= Paston Coke =

Jamaican sprinter (born 1971)

Personal information
- Born: 23 August 1971 (age 54) Saint James Parish, Jamaica

Sport
- Sport: Track and field
Medal record
Representing Jamaica
World Athletics Championships
| Bronze medal – third place | 1999 Seville | 4x400m relay |
Summer Universiade
| Silver medal – second place | 1999 Palma de Mallorca | 400m |
Pan American Games
| Gold medal – first place | 1999 Winnipeg | 4x400m relay |

Paston Coke (born 23 August 1971) is a Jamaican sprinter. He was born in St. James, one of the western parishes of Jamaica. Paston competes in 100M, 200m and 400M dash. He won the silver medal in the 400 metres at 1999 World Student Games in personal record of 45.15 seconds. He was a member of Jamaica 4 x 400 metres relay team that won bronze medal in at the 1999 IAAF World Championships and gold medal at the 1999 Pan American Games. Paston competed at the NCAA II for New York Institute of Technology where he won two individual 400m titles and three relay titles. Paston has taken his running abilities and turned it into becoming a Professional Electrical Engineer (PE).
