= Clement Chukwu =

Nigerian sprinter

Clement C. Chukwu
Personal information
- Nationality: Nigerian
- Born: 7 July 1973 (age 53) Umuahia, Nigeria

Sport
- Sport: Track and field
- Events: 200 m, 400 m
- College team: Eastern Michigan University
Medal record
Men's athletics
Representing Nigeria
Olympic Games
Gold medal – first place	2000 Sydney	4 × 400 m relay
African Championships
Gold medal – first place	1998 Dakar	400 m
Summer Universiade
Gold medal – first place	1997 Catania	400 m
Representing Africa
IAAF World Cup
Bronze medal – third place	1998 Johannesburg	4 × 400 m relay

Clement Chukwu (born 7 July 1973) is a former Nigerian athlete who specialized in the 200 and 400 metres.

== Academics ==
Chukwu attended Eastern Michigan University where he received his Bachelor of Arts in Urban and Regional Planning, minoring in Geography, and a Master of Science degree in Geographical Information Systems.

In 2003, Chukwu was a city planner for the city of Toledo, Ohio. He is currently the Planning Director for the City of Pickerington, Ohio, a suburb southeast of Columbus.

== Track and field ==
After being banned from 1992 to 1996 for a positive drug test he reemerged at the 1996 Olympics over 400 metres, being knocked out in the quarter-finals. He later won gold medals in this event at the 1997 Universiade and the 1998 African Championships, and a silver medal at the 1999 All-Africa Games. At the 2000 Olympics he was a part of the Nigerian team that won the silver medal in the 4 × 400 metres relay, which was later elevated to gold after the USA team was stripped of the gold medal.

His personal bests are: 200 meters Outdoor is 20:30 in 1998; 200 meters Indoor 20:78; 400 meters Outdoor 44.65; 400 meters Indoor

He was inducted into the Eastern Michigan Hall of Fame in 2011.

== See also ==
- List of sportspeople sanctioned for doping offences
