= Marc Foucan =

French sprinter

Personal information
- Born: 14 October 1971 (age 55) Ermont, France

Sport
- Sport: Track and field
Medal record
Representing France
Mediterranean Games
Bronze medal – third place	2001 Tunis	4x400m relay
European Indoor Championships
Silver medal – second place	2002 Vienna	4x400m relay

Marc Foucan (born 14 October 1971) is a French athlete who specialises in the 400 meters. Foucan competed in the men's 4 x 400 meter relay at the 2000 Summer Olympics.
