= Arnaud Malherbe =

South African sprinter

Personal information
- Born: 20 November 1972 (age 53) Port Elizabeth, Eastern Cape, South Africa

Sport
- Sport: Track and field
Medal record
Representing South Africa
World Championships
Bronze medal – third place	1999 Seville	4x400 m
African Championships
Bronze medal – third place	2004 Brazzaville	4×400 m
Representing Africa
IAAF World Cup
Bronze medal – third place	1998 Johannesburg	4x400 m

Arnaud Malherbe (born 20 November 1972) is a South African sprinter who specialized in the 400 metres.

His personal best time is 44.59 seconds, achieved in March 1999 in Roodepoort. At the time, it was a South African Record. He has the distinction of being the first South African to break 45 seconds in the 400m and was national champion four consecutive times between 1996 and 1999.

Together with Jopie van Oudtshoorn, Hendrick Mokganyetsi and Adriaan Botha he also held the South African record in the 4 × 400 metres relay with 3:00.20 minutes, achieved at the 1999 World Championships in Seville. In those World Championships, he ran the fastest split ever recorded by a South African man, with 43.78s, helping his team win the bronze medal. In 1998, in the World Cup in Johannesburg, he was a member of the African 4 × 400 m Relay Team who eventually received the bronze medal, after disqualification of the USA team, due to doping violations.

== Achievements ==
Year	Tournament	Venue	Result	Extra
1995	Universiade	Fukuoka, Japan	6th	400 m
1997	World Championships	Athens, Greece	5th	4 × 400 m relay, 3:00.26 NR
1998	Commonwealth Games	Kuala Lumpur, Malaysia	5th	400 m
1999	World Championships	Seville, Spain	3rd	4 × 400 m relay, 3:00.20 NR
2002	Commonwealth Games	Manchester, England	4th	4 × 400 m relay
