= Adriaan Botha (sprinter) =

South African sprinter

Personal information
- Born: 8 March 1977 (age 49)

Sport
- Sport: Track and field
Medal record
Representing South Africa
World Championships
Bronze medal – third place	1999 Seville	4x400m relay

Adriaan Botha (born 8 March 1977) is a retired South African sprinter who specialized in the 400 metres.

His personal best time is 45.14 seconds, achieved in March 2001 in Roodepoort. Together with Jopie van Oudtshoorn, Hendrick Mokganyetsi and Arnaud Malherbe he holds the South African record in 4 x 400 metres relay with 3:00.20 minutes, achieved at the 1999 World Championships in Seville where South Africa finished fourth. The team was subsequently awarded bronze medals for a third place in the same race, following a positive drugs test in the US team.
