= 1999 World Championships in Athletics =

Athletics competition in Seville, Spain

7th World Championships in Athletics
- Host city: Seville, Spain
- Nations: 201
- Athletes: 1821
- Dates: 20–29 August 1999
- Opened by: Juan Carlos I
- Closed by: Primo Nebiolo
- Main venue: Estadio Olímpico de Sevila

The 7th World Championships in Athletics (Spanish: Campeonato Mundial de Atletismo de 1999), a World Athletic Championships event held under the auspices of the International Association of Athletics Federations, were held at the Estadio Olímpico de Sevilla, Seville, Spain, between the August 20 and August 29.

One of the main highlights of the games was the world record set in the 400 metres by Michael Johnson of the United States in a time of 43.18 seconds.

== Men's results ==
=== Track ===
1995 | 1997 | 1999 | 2001 | 2003

| Event | Gold | | Silver | | Bronze | |
|---|---|---|---|---|---|---|
| 100 m | Maurice Greene; United States | 9.80 (CR) | Bruny Surin; Canada | 9.84 (=NR) | Dwain Chambers; Great Britain | 9.97 (PB) |
| 200 m | Maurice Greene; United States | 19.90 (SB) | Claudinei da Silva; Brazil | 20.00 (PB) | Francis Obikwelu; Nigeria | 20.11 |
| 400 m | Michael Johnson; United States | 43.18 (WR) | Sanderlei Claro Parrela; Brazil | 44.29 (AR) | Alejandro Cárdenas; Mexico | 44.31 (NR) |
| 800 m | Wilson Kipketer; Denmark | 1:43.30 | Hezekiél Sepeng; South Africa | 1:43.32 | Djabir Saïd-Guerni; Algeria | 1:44.18 (NR) |
| 1500 m | Hicham El Guerrouj; Morocco | 3:27.65 (CR) | Noah Ngeny; Kenya | 3:28.73 (NR) | Reyes Estévez; Spain | 3:30.57 (PB) |
| 5000 m | Salah Hissou; Morocco | 12:58.13 (CR) | Benjamin Limo; Kenya | 12:58.72 | Mohammed Mourhit; Belgium | 12:58.80 |
| 10,000 m | Haile Gebrselassie; Ethiopia | 27:57.27 | Paul Tergat; Kenya | 27:58.56 | Assefa Mezgebu; Ethiopia | 27:59.15 |
| Marathon | Abel Antón; Spain | 2:13:36 | Vincenzo Modica; Italy | 2:14:03 | Nobuyuki Sato; Japan | 2:14:07 |
| 110 m hurdles | Colin Jackson; Great Britain | 13.04 (SB) | Anier García; Cuba | 13.07 (NR) | Duane Ross; United States | 13.12 (PB) |
| 400 m hurdles | Fabrizio Mori; Italy | 47.72 (WL) | Stéphane Diagana; France | 48.12 (SB) | Marcel Schelbert; Switzerland | 48.13 (NR) |
| 3000 m st. | Christopher Kosgei; Kenya | 8:11.76 | Wilson Boit Kipketer; Kenya | 8:12.09 | Ali Ezzine; Morocco | 8.12.73 |
| 20 km walk | Ilya Markov; Russia | 1:23:34 | Jefferson Pérez; Ecuador | 1:24:19 | Daniel García; Mexico | 1:24:31 |
| 50 km walk | Ivano Brugnetti; Italy | 3:47:54^{1} (PB) | Nikolay Matyukhin; Russia | 3:48:18 | Curt Clausen; United States | 3:50:55 |
| 4 × 100 m relay | United States (USA); Jon Drummond; Tim Montgomery; Brian Lewis; Maurice Greene | 37.59 (WL) | Great Britain (GBR); Jason Gardener; Darren Campbell; Marlon Devonish; Dwain Chambers; Allyn Condon* | 37.73 (AR) | Brazil (BRA); Raphael de Oliveira; Claudinei da Silva; Édson Ribeiro; André da Silva | 38.05^{2} (AR) |
| 4 × 400 m relay | Poland (POL); Tomasz Czubak; Robert Maćkowiak; Jacek Bocian; Piotr Haczek; Piotr Długosielski* | 2:58.91^{3} (SB) | Jamaica (JAM); Michael McDonald; Greg Haughton; Danny McFarlane; Davian Clarke; Paston Coke*; Omar A. Brown* | 2:59.34 | South Africa (RSA); Jopie van Oudtshoorn; Hendrick Mokganyetsi; Adriaan Botha; Arnaud Malherbe | 3:00.20 (NR) |
WR world record | AR area record | CR championship record | GR games record | NR national record | OR Olympic record | PB personal best | SB season best | WL world leading (in a given season)

Note: * Indicates athletes who ran in preliminary rounds.
^{1} German Skurygin of Russia originally won the gold medal in the 50 km walk in 3:44:23, but was disqualified after he tested positive for drugs in November 2001.
^{2} Nigeria (Innocent Asonze, Francis Obikwelu, Daniel Effiong, Deji Aliu) originally won the bronze medal in 37.91, but were disqualified on August 31, 2005 after it was found Asonze had failed a doping test in June 1999.
^{3} The United States (Jerome Davis, Antonio Pettigrew, Angelo Taylor, Michael Johnson) originally won the gold medal in 2:56.45, but were disqualified in 2008 after Antonio Pettigrew admitted to using HGH and EPO between 1997 and 2003.

=== Field ===
1995 | 1997 | 1999 | 2001 | 2003

| Event | Gold | | Silver | | Bronze | |
|---|---|---|---|---|---|---|
| High jump | Vyacheslav Voronin; Russia | 2.37 (WL) | Mark Boswell; Canada | 2.35 (NR) | Martin Buß; Germany | 2.32 |
| Pole vault | Maksim Tarasov; Russia | 6.02 (CR) | Dmitri Markov; Australia | 5.90 | Aleksandr Averbukh; Israel | 5.80 (NR) |
| Long jump | Iván Pedroso; Cuba | 8.56 | Yago Lamela; Spain | 8.40 | Gregor Cankar; Slovenia | 8.36 (SB) |
| Triple jump | Charles Friedek; Germany | 17.59 (WL) | Rostislav Dimitrov; Bulgaria | 17.49 (PB) | Jonathan Edwards; Great Britain | 17.48 |
| Shot put | C.J. Hunter; United States | 21.79 (PB) | Oliver-Sven Buder; Germany | 21.42 (SB) | Oleksandr Bagach; Ukraine | 21.26 |
| Discus throw | Anthony Washington; United States | 69.08 (CR) | Jürgen Schult; Germany | 68.18 (SB) | Lars Riedel; Germany | 68.09 |
| Javelin throw | Aki Parviainen; Finland | 89.52 | Konstadinos Gatsioudis; Greece | 89.18 | Jan Železný; Czech Republic | 87.67 |
| Hammer throw | Karsten Kobs; Germany | 80.24 | Zsolt Németh; Hungary | 79.05 | Vladislav Piskunov; Ukraine | 79.03 |
| Decathlon | Tomáš Dvořák; Czech Republic | 8744 | Dean Macey; Great Britain | 8556 (PB) | Chris Huffins; United States | 8547 (SB) |
WR world record | AR area record | CR championship record | GR games record | NR national record | OR Olympic record | PB personal best | SB season best | WL world leading (in a given season)

== Women's results ==
=== Track ===
1995 | 1997 | 1999 | 2001 | 2003

| Event | Gold | | Silver | | Bronze | |
|---|---|---|---|---|---|---|
| 100 m | Marion Jones; United States | 10.70 (CR) | Inger Miller; United States | 10.79 | Ekaterini Thanou; Greece | 10.84 |
| 200 m | Inger Miller; United States | 21.77 (WL) | Beverly McDonald; Jamaica | 22.22 (PB) | Merlene Frazer; Jamaica | 22.26 |
| 200 m | Inger Miller; United States | 21.77 (WL) | Beverly McDonald; Jamaica | 22.22 (PB) | Andrea Philipp; Germany | 22.26 |
| 400 m | Cathy Freeman; Australia | 49.67 (SB) | Anja Rücker; Germany | 49.74 (PB) | Lorraine Graham-Fenton; Jamaica | 49.92 (PB) |
| 800 m | Ludmila Formanová; Czech Republic | 1:56.68 | Maria Mutola; Mozambique | 1:56.72 | Svetlana Masterkova; Russia | 1:56.93 |
| 1500 m | Svetlana Masterkova; Russia | 3:59.53 (SB) | Regina Jacobs; United States | 4:00.35 (PB) | Kutre Dulecha; Ethiopia | 4:00.96 (SB) |
| 5000 m | Gabriela Szabo; Romania | 14:41.82 (CR) | Zahra Ouaziz; Morocco | 14:43.15 | Ayelech Worku; Ethiopia | 14:44.22 (PB) |
| 10,000 m | Gete Wami; Ethiopia | 30:24.56 (CR) | Paula Radcliffe; Great Britain | 30:27.13 (NR) | Tegla Loroupe; Kenya | 30:32.03 (NR) |
| Marathon | Jong Song-Ok; North Korea | 2:26:59 (NR) | Ari Ichihashi; Japan | 2:27:02 (PB) | Lidia Șimon; Romania | 2:27:41 |
| 100 m hurdles | Gail Devers; United States | 12.37 (WL) | Gloria Alozie; Nigeria | 12.44 (AR) | Ludmila Engquist; Sweden | 12.47 (NR) |
| 400 m hurdles | Daimí Pernía; Cuba | 52.89 (WL) | Nezha Bidouane; Morocco | 52.90 (AR) | Deon Hemmings; Jamaica | 53.16 (SB) |
| 20 km walk | Liu Hongyu; China | 1:30:50 | Wang Yan; China | 1:30:52 | Kerry Saxby-Junna; Australia | 1:31:18 (SB) |
| 4 × 100 m relay | Bahamas (BAH); Savatheda Fynes; Chandra Sturrup; Pauline Davis-Thompson; Debbie Ferguson; Eldece Clarke-Lewis* | 41.92 (WL) | France (FRA); Patricia Girard; Muriel Hurtis; Katia Benth; Christine Arron; Fabé Dia* | 42.06 (NR) | Jamaica (JAM); Aleen Bailey; Merlene Frazer; Beverly McDonald; Peta-Gaye Dowdie | 42.15 (SB) |
| 4 × 400 m relay | Russia (RUS); Tatyana Chebykina; Svetlana Goncharenko; Olga Kotlyarova; Natalya Nazarova; Natalya Sharova*; Yekaterina Bakhvalova* | 3:21.98 (WL) | United States (USA); Suziann Reid; Maicel Malone-Wallace; Michelle Collins; Jearl Miles Clark; Andrea Anderson* | 3:22.09 (SB) | Germany (GER); Anke Feller; Uta Rohländer; Anja Rücker; Grit Breuer; Anja Knippel* | 3:22.43 (SB) |
WR world record | AR area record | CR championship record | GR games record | NR national record | OR Olympic record | PB personal best | SB season best | WL world leading (in a given season)

Note: * Indicates athletes who ran in preliminary rounds.

=== Field ===
1995 |1997 |1999 |2001 |2003

| Event | Gold | | Silver | | Bronze | |
|---|---|---|---|---|---|---|
| High jump | Inha Babakova; Ukraine | 1.99 | Yelena Yelesina; Russia | 1.99 | Svetlana Lapina; Russia | 1.99 (PB) |
| Pole vault | Stacy Dragila; United States | 4.60 (WR) | Anzhela Balakhonova; Ukraine | 4.55 (AR) | Tatiana Grigorieva; Australia | 4.45 |
| Long jump | Niurka Montalvo; Spain | 7.06 (NR) | Fiona May; Italy | 6.94 | Marion Jones; United States | 6.83 |
| Triple jump | Paraskevi Tsiamita; Greece | 14.88 | Yamilé Aldama; Cuba | 14.61 | Olga Vasdeki; Greece | 14.61 |
| Shot put | Astrid Kumbernuss; Germany | 19.85 (SB) | Nadine Kleinert; Germany | 19.61 (PB) | Svetlana Krivelyova; Russia | 19.43 |
| Discus throw | Franka Dietzsch; Germany | 68.14 | Anastasia Kelesidou; Greece | 66.05 | Nicoleta Grasu; Romania | 65.35 |
| Hammer throw | Mihaela Melinte; Romania | 75.20 | Olga Kuzenkova; Russia | 72.56 | Lisa Misipeka; American Samoa | 66.06 |
| Javelin throw | Mirela Manjani; Greece | 67.09 (PB) | Tatyana Shikolenko; Russia | 66.37 (PB) | Trine Hattestad; Norway | 66.06 |
| Heptathlon | Eunice Barber; France | 6861 (PB) | Denise Lewis; Great Britain | 6724 | Ghada Shouaa; Syria | 6500 |
WR world record | AR area record | CR championship record | GR games record | NR national record | OR Olympic record | PB personal best | SB season best | WL world leading (in a given season)

== Medal table ==
* Host nation (Spain)

| Rank | Nation | Gold | Silver | Bronze | Total |
|---|---|---|---|---|---|
| 1 | United States (USA) | 10 | 3 | 4 | 17 |
| 2 | Russia (RUS) | 5 | 4 | 3 | 12 |
| 3 | Germany (GER) | 4 | 4 | 4 | 12 |
| 4 | Greece (GRE) | 2 | 2 | 2 | 6 |
| 5 | Morocco (MAR) | 2 | 2 | 1 | 5 |
| 6 | Cuba (CUB) | 2 | 2 | 0 | 4 |
| 6 | Italy (ITA) | 2 | 2 | 0 | 4 |
| 8 | Spain (ESP)* | 2 | 1 | 1 | 4 |
| 9 | Ethiopia (ETH) | 2 | 0 | 3 | 5 |
| 10 | Romania (ROU) | 2 | 0 | 2 | 4 |
| 11 | Czech Republic (CZE) | 2 | 0 | 1 | 3 |
| 12 | Great Britain (GBR) | 1 | 4 | 2 | 7 |
| 13 | Kenya (KEN) | 1 | 4 | 1 | 6 |
| 14 | France (FRA) | 1 | 2 | 0 | 3 |
| 15 | Australia (AUS) | 1 | 1 | 2 | 4 |
| 15 | Ukraine (UKR) | 1 | 1 | 2 | 4 |
| 17 | China (CHN) | 1 | 1 | 0 | 2 |
| 18 | Bahamas (BAH) | 1 | 0 | 0 | 1 |
| 18 | Denmark (DEN) | 1 | 0 | 0 | 1 |
| 18 | Finland (FIN) | 1 | 0 | 0 | 1 |
| 18 | North Korea (PRK) | 1 | 0 | 0 | 1 |
| 18 | Poland (POL) | 1 | 0 | 0 | 1 |
| 23 | Jamaica (JAM) | 0 | 2 | 4 | 6 |
| 24 | Brazil (BRA) | 0 | 2 | 1 | 3 |
| 25 | Canada (CAN) | 0 | 2 | 0 | 2 |
| 26 | Japan (JPN) | 0 | 1 | 1 | 2 |
| 26 | Nigeria (NGR) | 0 | 1 | 1 | 2 |
| 26 | South Africa (SAF) | 0 | 1 | 1 | 2 |
| 29 | Bulgaria (BUL) | 0 | 1 | 0 | 1 |
| 29 | Ecuador (ECU) | 0 | 1 | 0 | 1 |
| 29 | Hungary (HUN) | 0 | 1 | 0 | 1 |
| 29 | Mozambique (MOZ) | 0 | 1 | 0 | 1 |
| 33 | Mexico (MEX) | 0 | 0 | 2 | 2 |
| 34 | Algeria (ALG) | 0 | 0 | 1 | 1 |
| 34 | American Samoa (ASA) | 0 | 0 | 1 | 1 |
| 34 | Belgium (BEL) | 0 | 0 | 1 | 1 |
| 34 | Israel (ISR) | 0 | 0 | 1 | 1 |
| 34 | Norway (NOR) | 0 | 0 | 1 | 1 |
| 34 | Slovenia (SLO) | 0 | 0 | 1 | 1 |
| 34 | Sweden (SWE) | 0 | 0 | 1 | 1 |
| 34 | Switzerland (SUI) | 0 | 0 | 1 | 1 |
| 34 | Syria (SYR) | 0 | 0 | 1 | 1 |
| Totals (42 entries) | | 46 | 46 | 47 | 139 |

== See also ==
- 1999 in athletics (track and field)
