= 400 metres at the World Athletics Championships =

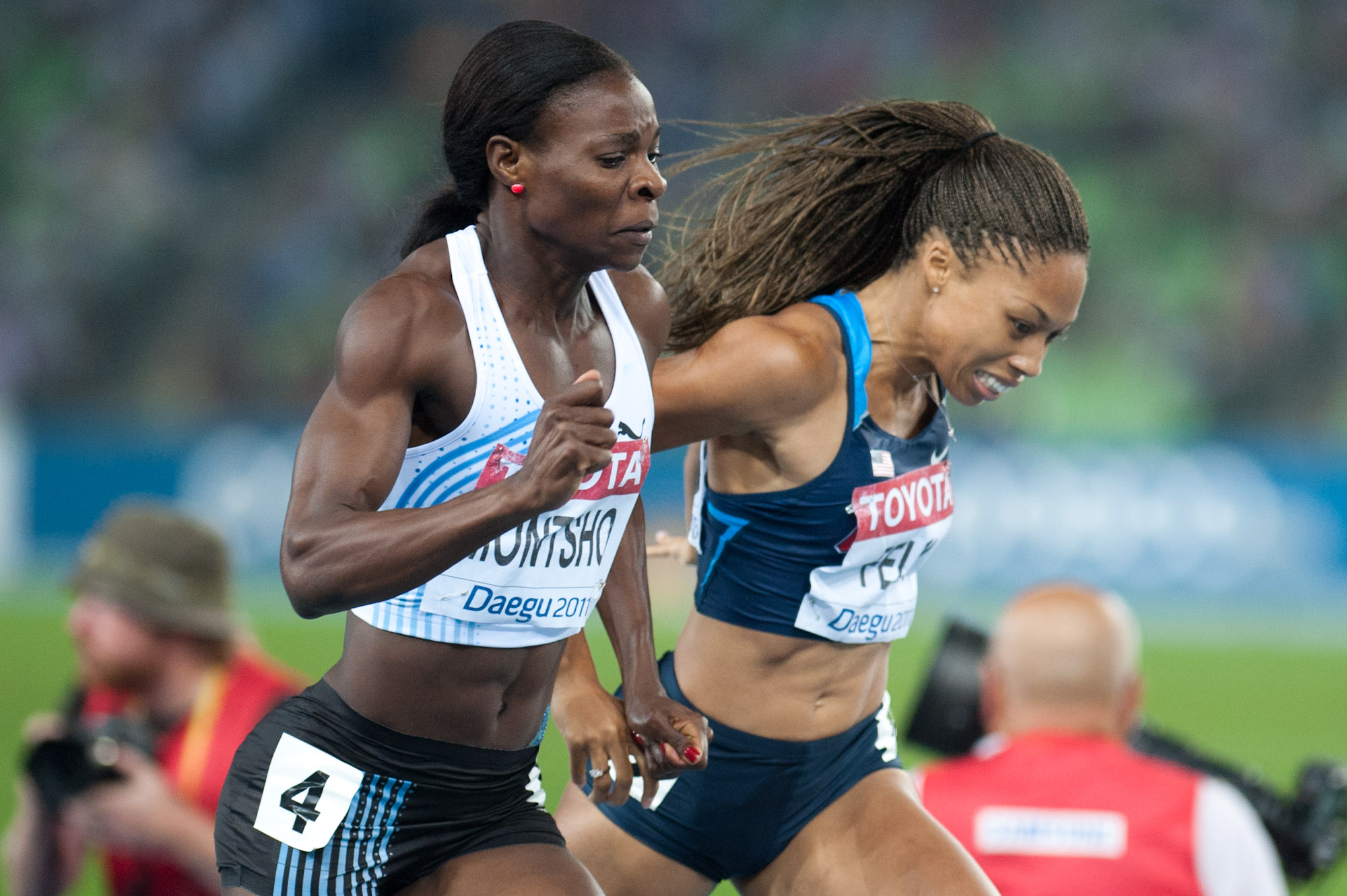
- Amantle Montsho and Allyson Felix at the finish of the 2011 women's final

Overview
- Gender: Men and women
- Years held: Men: 1983 – 2025; Women: 1983 – 2025

Championship record
- Men: 43.18 Michael Johnson (1999)
- Women: 47.78 Sydney McLaughlin-Levrone (2025)

Reigning champion
- Men: Collen Kebinatshipi (BOT)
- Women: Sydney McLaughlin-Levrone (USA)

The 400 metres at the World Championships in Athletics has been contested by both men and women since the inaugural edition in 1983. It is the second most prestigious title in the discipline after the 400 metres at the Olympics. The competition format typically has two or three qualifying rounds leading to a final between eight athletes.

The championship records for the event are 43.18 seconds for men, set by Michael Johnson in 1999, and 47.99 seconds for women, set by Jarmila Kratochvílová in 1983. The men's world record has been broken at the competition on one occasion and Johnson's championship record remains the world record as of 2015. The current women's championship record stood as the women's world record for two years and remains the only time that feat has been accomplished at the championships.

Michael Johnson is the most successful athlete of the World Championships 400 m, having won four straight titles from 1993 to 1999. He is the only sprint athlete to have won that many individual titles in an event. The second most successful is LaShawn Merritt – a two-time champion and the only other athlete to have won four medals. The most successful women are Marie-José Pérec, Cathy Freeman and Christine Ohuruogu, all of whom have won two world titles. Jeremy Wariner is the only other person to have won two titles, and also has three medals to his name.

The United States is comfortably the most successful nation in the discipline – American men have topped the podium ten times and taken 23 medals in total. American women also top the table with two golds among seven medals. Jamaica is the only other nation to have won more than one medal in the men's race, and has won eleven medals in total across the sexes. Great Britain has had two winners and two runners-up. Australia, France and Bahamas are the only other nations to have won multiple gold medals.

Jerome Young is the only athlete to be stripped of a medal in the event, as he lost his 2003 gold medal due to a doping ban.

== Age records ==
- All information from World Athletics.

Distinction	Male			Female		
Distinction	Athlete	Age	Date	Athlete	Age	Date
Youngest champion	Kirani James (GRN)	18 years, 363 days	30 Aug 2011	Salwa Eid Naser (BHR)	21 years, 133 days	3 Oct 2019
Youngest medalist	Kirani James (GRN)	18 years, 363 days	30 Aug 2011	Salwa Eid Naser (BHR)	19 years, 78 days	9 Aug 2017
Youngest finalist	Thomas Schönlebe (GDR)	18 years, 4 days	10 Aug 1983	Salwa Eid Naser (BHR)	19 years, 78 days	9 Aug 2017
Youngest participant	Kerth Gumbs (AIA)	16 years, 183 days	4 Aug 2001	Dijana Kojić (BIH)	15 years, 7 days	2 Aug 1997
Oldest champion	Michael Johnson (USA)	31 years, 347 days	26 Aug 1999	Jarmila Kratochvílová (TCH)	32 years, 196 days	10 Aug 1983
Oldest medalist	Michael Johnson (USA)	31 years, 347 days	26 Aug 1999	Jarmila Kratochvílová (TCH)	32 years, 196 days	10 Aug 1983
Oldest finalist	Michael Johnson (USA)	31 years, 347 days	26 Aug 1999	Novlene Williams-Mills (JAM)	35 years, 105 days	9 Aug 2017
Oldest participant	Chris Brown (BAH)	36 years, 313 days	24 Aug 2015	Amy Mbacké Thiam (SEN)	36 years, 274 days	11 Aug 2013

== Doping ==
Antonio Pettigrew, the 1991 champion, was the first have his results annulled due to doping, although this ban affected his finalist placings from 1997 to 2001 only. His fellow American Jerome Young became the first and thus far only 400 m athlete to be stripped of their world title. His ban covered his 2003 win, a 2001 semi-finalist placing, and a fourth-place finish in 1999.

Natalya Sologub of Belarus became the first female 400 m runner to be disqualified from the championships, having originally been a 2001 semi-finalist. The 2003 sixth-place finish of Calvin Harrison was annulled for doping, as weer the semi-finalist runs of Amaka Ogoegbunam in 2009 and Antonina Yefremova in 2011.

== Medalists ==
=== Men ===
Championships	Gold	Silver	Bronze
1983 Helsinki	Bert Cameron (JAM)	Michael Franks (USA)	Sunder Nix (USA)
1987 Rome	Thomas Schönlebe (GDR)	Innocent Egbunike (NGA)	Harry Reynolds (USA)
1991 Tokyo	Antonio Pettigrew (USA)	Roger Black (GBR)	Danny Everett (USA)
1993 Stuttgart	Michael Johnson (USA)	Butch Reynolds (USA)	Samson Kitur (KEN)
1995 Gothenburg	Michael Johnson (USA)	Butch Reynolds (USA)	Greg Haughton (JAM)
1997 Athens	Michael Johnson (USA)	Davis Kamoga (UGA)	Tyree Washington (USA)
1999 Seville	Michael Johnson (USA)	Sanderlei Parrela (BRA)	Alejandro Cárdenas (MEX)
2001 Edmonton	Avard Moncur (BAH)	Ingo Schultz (GER)	Greg Haughton (JAM)
2003 Saint-Denis	Tyree Washington (USA)	Marc Raquil (FRA)	Michael Blackwood (JAM)
2005 Helsinki	Jeremy Wariner (USA)	Andrew Rock (USA)	Tyler Christopher (CAN)
2007 Osaka	Jeremy Wariner (USA)	LaShawn Merritt (USA)	Angelo Taylor (USA)
2009 Berlin	LaShawn Merritt (USA)	Jeremy Wariner (USA)	Renny Quow (TRI)
2011 Daegu	Kirani James (GRN)	LaShawn Merritt (USA)	Kévin Borlée (BEL)
2013 Moscow	LaShawn Merritt (USA)	Tony McQuay (USA)	Luguelín Santos (DOM)
2015 Beijing	Wayde van Niekerk (RSA)	LaShawn Merritt (USA)	Kirani James (GRN)
2017 London	Wayde van Niekerk (RSA)	Steven Gardiner (BAH)	Abdalelah Haroun (QAT)
2019 Doha	Steven Gardiner (BAH)	Anthony Zambrano (COL)	Fred Kerley (USA)
2022 Eugene	Michael Norman (USA)	Kirani James (GRN)	Matthew Hudson-Smith (GBR)
2023 Budapest	Antonio Watson (JAM)	Matthew Hudson-Smith (GBR)	Quincy Hall (USA)
2025 Tokyo	Collen Kebinatshipi (BOT)	Jereem Richards (TTO)	Bayapo Ndori (BOT)

==== Medalists by country ====
Rank	Nation	Gold	Silver	Bronze	Total
1	United States (USA)	11	9	6	27
2	Bahamas (BAH)	2	1	0	3
3	Jamaica (JAM)	2	0	3	5
4	South Africa (RSA)	2	0	0	2
5	Grenada (GRN)	1	1	1	3
6	Botswana (BOT)	1	0	1	2
7	East Germany (GDR)	1	0	0	1
8	Great Britain (GBR)	0	2	1	3
9	Trinidad and Tobago (TRI)	0	1	1	2
10	Brazil (BRA)	0	1	0	1
10	Colombia (COL)	0	1	0	1
10	France (FRA)	0	1	0	1
10	Germany (GER)	0	1	0	1
10	Nigeria (NGR)	0	1	0	1
10	Uganda (UGA)	0	1	0	1
16	Belgium (BEL)	0	0	1	1
16	Canada (CAN)	0	0	1	1
16	Dominican Republic (DOM)	0	0	1	1
16	Kenya (KEN)	0	0	1	1
16	Mexico (MEX)	0	0	1	1
16	Qatar (QAT)	0	0	1	1

==== Multiple medalists ====
Rank	Athlete	Nation	Period	Gold	Silver	Bronze	Total
1	Michael Johnson	United States (USA)	1991–1999	4	0	0	4
2	LaShawn Merritt	United States (USA)	2007–2013	2	3	0	5
3	Jeremy Wariner	United States (USA)	2005–2009	2	1	0	3
4	Wayde van Niekerk	South Africa (RSA)	2015–2017	2	0	0	2
5	Kirani James	Grenada (GRN)	2011–2022	1	1	1	3
6	Tyree Washington	United States (USA)	1997–2003	1	0	1	2
7	Butch Reynolds	United States (USA)	1987–1995	0	2	1	3
8	Greg Haughton	Jamaica (JAM)	1995–2001	0	0	2	2

=== Women ===
Championships	Gold	Silver	Bronze
1983 Helsinki	Jarmila Kratochvílová (TCH)	Taťána Kocembová (TCH)	Mariya Pinigina (URS)
1987 Rome	Olga Bryzgina (URS)	Petra Muller (GDR)	Kirsten Emmelmann (GDR)
1991 Tokyo	Marie-José Pérec (FRA)	Grit Breuer (GER)	Sandra Myers (ESP)
1993 Stuttgart	Jearl Miles (USA)	Natasha Kaiser-Brown (USA)	Sandie Richards (JAM)
1995 Gothenburg	Marie-José Pérec (FRA)	Pauline Davis (BAH)	Jearl Miles (USA)
1997 Athens	Cathy Freeman (AUS)	Sandie Richards (JAM)	Jearl Miles Clark (USA)
1999 Seville	Cathy Freeman (AUS)	Anja Rücker (GER)	Lorraine Graham-Fenton (JAM)
2001 Edmonton	Amy Mbacké Thiam (SEN)	Lorraine Fenton (JAM)	Ana Guevara (MEX)
2003 Saint-Denis	Ana Guevara (MEX)	Lorraine Fenton (JAM)	Amy Mbacké Thiam (SEN)
2005 Helsinki	Tonique Williams-Darling (BAH)	Sanya Richards (USA)	Ana Guevara (MEX)
2007 Osaka	Christine Ohuruogu (GBR)	Nicola Sanders (GBR)	Novlene Williams (JAM)
2009 Berlin	Sanya Richards (USA)	Shericka Williams (JAM)	Antonina Krivoshapka (RUS)
2011 Daegu	Amantle Montsho (BOT)	Allyson Felix (USA)	Francena McCorory (USA)§
2013 Moscow	Christine Ohuruogu (GBR)	Amantle Montsho (BOT)	Stephanie McPherson (JAM)^{§}
2015 Beijing	Allyson Felix (USA)	Shaunae Miller (BAH)	Shericka Jackson (JAM)
2017 London	Phyllis Francis (USA)	Salwa Eid Naser (BHR)	Allyson Felix (USA)
2019 Doha	Salwa Eid Naser (BHR)	Shaunae Miller-Uibo (BAH)	Shericka Jackson (JAM)
2022 Eugene	Shaunae Miller-Uibo (BAH)	Marileidy Paulino (DOM)	Sada Williams (BAR)
2023 Budapest	Marileidy Paulino (DOM)	Natalia Kaczmarek (POL)	Sada Williams (BAR)
2025 Tokyo	Sydney McLaughlin-Levrone (USA)	Marileidy Paulino (DOM)	Salwa Eid Naser (BHR)

§ : awarded following doping disqualification.

==== Medalists by country ====
Rank	Nation	Gold	Silver	Bronze	Total
1	United States (USA)	5	3	4	12
2	Bahamas (BAH)	2	3	0	5
3	Great Britain (GBR)	2	1	0	3
5	Australia (AUS)	2	0	0	2
5	France (FRA)	2	0	0	2
6	Dominican Republic (DOM)	1	2	0	3
7	Bahrain (BHR)	1	1	1	3
8	Botswana (BOT)	1	1	0	2
8	Czechoslovakia (TCH)	1	1	0	2
10	Mexico (MEX)	1	0	2	3
11	Senegal (SEN)	1	0	1	2
11	Soviet Union (URS)	1	0	1	2
13	Jamaica (JAM)	0	4	6	10
14	Germany (GER)	0	2	0	2
15	East Germany (GDR)	0	1	1	2
16	Poland (POL)	0	1	0	1
17	Barbados (BAR)	0	0	2	2
17	Russia (RUS)	0	0	2	2
13	Spain (ESP)	0	0	1	1

==== Multiple medalists ====
Rank	Athlete	Nation	Period	Gold	Silver	Bronze	Total
1	Marie-José Pérec	France (FRA)	1991–1995	2	0	0	2
1	Cathy Freeman	Australia (AUS)	1997–1999	2	0	0	2
1	Christine Ohuruogu	Great Britain (GBR)	2007–2013	2	0	0	2
4	Shaunae Miller-Uibo	Bahamas (BAH)	2015–2022	1	2	0	3
4	Marileidy Paulino	Dominican Republic (DOM)	2022-2025	1	2	0	3
6	Allyson Felix	United States (USA)	2011–2017	1	1	1	3
6	Salwa Eid Naser	Bahrain (BHR)	2017–2025	1	1	1	3
8	Sanya Richards	United States (USA)	2005–2009	1	1	0	2
9	Amantle Montsho	Botswana (BOT)	2011–2013	1	1	0	2
10	Jearl Miles Clark	United States (USA)	1993–1997	1	0	2	3
10	Ana Guevara	Mexico (MEX)	2001–2005	1	0	2	3
12	Amy Mbacke Thiam	Senegal (SEN)	2001–2003	1	0	1	2
13	Lorraine Fenton	Jamaica (JAM)	1999–2003	0	2	1	3
14	Sandie Richards	Jamaica (JAM)	1993–1997	0	1	1	2
15	Shericka Jackson	Jamaica (JAM)	2015–2019	0	0	2	2
15	Sada Williams	Barbados (BAR)	2022-2023	0	0	2	2

== Championship record progression ==
=== Men ===
Men's 400 metres World Championships record progression
Time	Athlete	Nation	Year	Round	Date
46.19	Sunder Nix	United States (USA)	1983	Heats	7 August 1983
46.11	Bert Cameron	Jamaica (JAM)	1983	Heats	7 August 1983
45.74	Hartmut Weber	West Germany (FRG)	1983	Heats	7 August 1983
45.57	Michael Franks	United States (USA)	1983	Quarter-finals	8 August 1983
45.44	Michael Franks	United States (USA)	1983	Semi-finals	9 August 1983
45.05	Bert Cameron	Jamaica (JAM)	1983	Final	10 August 1983
45.03	Derek Redmond	Great Britain (GBR)	1987	Quarter-finals	1987-08-31
44.81	Thomas Schönlebe	East Germany (GDR)	1987	Quarter-finals	1987-08-31
44.26	Innocent Egbunike	Nigeria (NGR)	1987	Semi-finals	1987-09-01
43.65	Michael Johnson	United States (USA)	1993	Final	1993-08-17
43.39	Michael Johnson	United States (USA)	1995	Final	1995-08-09
43.18 WR	Michael Johnson	United States (USA)	1997	Final	1999-08-26

=== Women ===
Women's 400 metres World Championships record progression
Time	Athlete	Nation	Year	Round	Date
52.42	Jarmila Kratochvílová	Czechoslovakia (TCH)	1983	Heats	1983-08-07
51.05	Mariya Pinigina	Soviet Union (URS)	1983	Quarter-finals	1983-08-08
50.07	Mariya Pinigina	Soviet Union (URS)	1983	Semi-finals	1983-08-09
47.99 WR	Jarmila Kratochvílová	Czechoslovakia (TCH)	1983	Final	1983-08-10
47.78	Sydney McLaughlin-Levrone	United States (USA)	2025	Final	2025-09-18

== Finishing times ==
=== Top ten fastest World Championship times ===
Fastest men's times at the World Championships
Rank	Time (sec)	Athlete	Nation	Games	Date
1	43.18	Michael Johnson	United States	1999	1998-08-26
2	43.39	Michael Johnson	United States	1995	1995-08-09
3	43.45	Jeremy Wariner	United States	2007	2007-08-31
4	43.48	Wayde van Niekerk	South Africa	2015	2015-08-26
4	43.48	Steven Gardiner	Bahamas	2019	2019-10-04
6	43.53	Collen Kebinatshipi	Botswana	2025	2025-09-18
7	43.61	Collen Kebinatshipi	Botswana	2025^{SF}	2025-09-16
8	43.65	Michael Johnson	United States	1993	1993-08-17
8	43.65	LaShawn Merritt	United States	2015	2015-08-26
10	43.72	Jereem Richards	Trinidad and Tobago	2025	2025-09-18

Fastest women's times at the World Championships
Rank	Time (sec)	Athlete	Nation	Games	Date
1	47.78	Sydney McLaughlin-Levrone	United States	2025	2025-09-18
2	47.98	Marileidy Paulino	Dominican Republic	2025	2025-09-18
3	47.99	Jarmila Kratochvílová	Czechoslovakia	1983	1983-08-10
4	48.14	Salwa Eid Naser	Bahrain	2019	2019-10-03
5	48.19	Salwa Eid Naser	Bahrain	2025	2025-09-18
6	48.29	Sydney McLaughlin-Levrone	United States	2025^{SF}	2025-09-16
7	48.37	Shaunae Miller-Uibo	Bahamas	2019	2019-10-03
8	48.59	Taťána Kocembová	Czechoslovakia	1983	1983-08-10
9	48.76	Marileidy Paulino	Dominican Republic	2023	2023-08-23
10	48.89	Ana Guevara	Mexico	2003	2003-08-27

== Bibliography ==
- Butler, Mark (2013). IAAF Statistics Book Moscow 2013 (PDF). IAAF. Archived from the original (PDF) on 12 October 2014.
