= Redouane Berkane =

Algerian footballer (born 2003)

Redouane Berkane ⵔⴻⴷⵓⴰⵏⴻ ⴱⴻⵔⴽⴰⵏⴻ
Personal information
- Full name: Redouane Berkane
- Date of birth: 7 July 2003 (age 23)
- Place of birth: Tazmalt, Algeria
- Height: 1.94 m (6 ft 4 in)
- Position: Striker

Team information
- Current team: Al-Wakrah
- Number: 11

Youth career
- AS Rodha Tazmalt
- CSP Tazmalt
- OS Tazmalt
- FE Tazmalt
- MO Béjaïa
- Olympique Akbou

Senior career*
Years	Team	Apps	(Gls)
2021–2023	Olympique Akbou		
2023–2025	JS Kabylie	51	(16)
2025–	Al-Wakrah	22	(10)

International career^{‡}
2024	Algeria Military		
2025	Algeria A'	7	(2)
2025–	Algeria	7	(2)
Medal record
Men's football
Representing Algeria
African Military Games
Gold medal – first place	2024 Abuja
- * Club domestic league appearances and goals as of October 20, 2026 ‡ National team caps and goals as of 10 January 2026 (UTC)

Redouane Berkane (Arabic: رضوان بركان; Tamazight: ⵔⴻⴷⵓⴰⵏⴻ ⴱⴻⵔⴽⴰⵏⴻ; born 7 July 2003) is an Algerian professional footballer who plays for Al-Wakrah as a striker and the Algeria national team.

== Club career ==
Redouane Berkane is from the village of Rodha, in Tazmalt, Béjaïa, Kabylia. In July 2023, coming from Olympique Akbou in the Algerian Ligue 3, he signed a three-year professional contract, with JS Kabylie. He made his professional debut, in September 2023, under the direction of coach Youcef Bouzidi. He scored his first goal, in the Algerian Ligue 1, against USM Alger, in October 2023. In May 2024, with the JS Kabylie U21 team, he won the Algerian League Cup U21 2023–24, against the ES Sétif U21 team. He scored two goals in this final, one during the overtime and the other during the penalty shoot-out. He finished the 2023–24 season as the best goal scorer of the senior team of JS Kabylie, with eight goals. In November 2024, he extended his contract, with JS Kabylie, until the end of the 2027–28 season. For a second consecutive season, he finished the 2024–25 season as JS Kabylie's top scorer, with 10 goals and he also won the prize of the best Algerian Ligue 1 player of the month of April 2025. In August 2025, he left JS Kabylie.

== International career ==
In November 2024, Redouane Berkane won a gold medal, with the Algeria Military football team, at the 2024 African Military Games.

In April 2025, he was called by Madjid Bougherra to play a decisive double confrontation against Gambia, with the Algeria A' football team, as part of the second round of the qualifiers, for the 2024 CHAN.

== Career statistics ==
=== International ===
As of match played on 10 January 2026

Appearances and goals by national team and year
National team	Year	Apps	Goals
Algeria	2025	6	2
Algeria	2026	1	0
Total		7	2

Scores and results list Algeria's goal tally first, score column indicates score after each Berkane goal.

List of international goals scored by Redouane Berkane
No.	Date	Venue	Opponent	Score	Result	Competition
1	6 December 2025	Khalifa International Stadium, Al Rayyan, Qatar	Bahrain	1–0	5–1	2025 FIFA Arab Cup

== Honours ==
=== Club ===
JS Kabylie U21

- Algerian League Cup U21: 2023–24

Olympique Akbou

- Algerian Ligue 3 - Center-East Group: 2022–23
- Algerian Ligue 4 - Group B: 2021–22

=== International ===
Algeria Military

- African Military Games: (gold) 2024

=== Individual ===
- Best goal scorer of JS Kabylie during the 2023–24 season (8 goals) and 2024–25 season (10 goals)
- Best Algerian Ligue 1 player of the month of April 2025
