= Athletics at the 2002 African Military Games =

I Africa Military Games
- Dates: 24–26 April 2002
- Host city: Nairobi, Kenya
- Venue: Moi International Sports Centre
- Events: 26

The athletics competition at the 2002 African Military Games was held from 24–26 April 2002 at the Moi International Sports Centre in Nairobi, Kenya.

A total of twenty-six events were contested, eighteen by men and eight by women. A near full track and field programme was held for men, with all regular track events being held and only the pole vault and hammer throw missing from the field events. The women's programme had limited entries so was mostly track running events, plus the long jump and high jump. No road or combined events were contested. All performances were affected by the high altitude of Nairobi.

The hosts, Kenya, were dominant at the competition, winning seventeen of the 26 gold medals on offer, including all but three of the track titles. The next most successful nation was Morocco, which won three gold medals and four silvers, having particular success in the women's section. Botswana took three golds in the men's events and also had the third largest medal haul at five. Military athletes from thirteen nations reached the podium.

Kenya provided the foremost international athletes at the meeting. The 2000 Sydney Olympics champion Noah Ngeny took the 800 metres title. Olympic medallist and former world champion Wilson Boit Kipketer easily won the 3000 metres steeplechase. Multiple world cross country medallist Paul Malakwen Kosgei was beaten to the 10,000 metres gold by John Cheruiyot Korir – a situation that was reversed at the 2002 African Championships in Athletics later that year. The 5000 metres winner Sammy Kipketer later established himself globally with another win at the 2002 Commonwealth Games.

The women's competition was of a lower standard, with the most prominent international athlete being 1500 m winner Naomi Mugo, who formerly won a middle-distance double at the African Championships in Athletics. The reigning 800 m Mediterranean Games champion Seltana Aït Hammou was also present and won her speciality. IAAF World Cross Country Championships participants Restituta Joseph, Anna Ndege and Olympian Nebiat Habtemariam were other globally established athletes to medal at the Africa Military Games.

The most successful athletes in the competition were Jacinta Wambui and David Kirui, both of Kenya and both winners of a 200 metres/400 metres sprint double.

== Medal summary ==
=== Men ===
Event	Gold		Silver		Bronze	
100 metres	Tlhalosang Molapisi (BOT)	10.3A	Stanley Towett (KEN)	10.4A	Dieudonné Tiekim (CMR)	10.5A
200 metres	David Kirui (KEN)	20.8A	Jacques Sambou (SEN)	20.9A	Stanley Towett (KEN)	21.7A
400 metres	David Kirui (KEN)	45.9A	Johnson Kubisa (BOT)	46.1A	Julius Chepkwony (KEN)	46.2A
800 metres	Noah Ngeny (KEN)	1:46.5A	Joseph Mutua (KEN)	1:47.0A	Ismail Ahmed Ismail (SUD)	1:47.5A
1500 metres	Robert Rono (KEN)	3:40.6A	Abdelkader Hachlaf (MAR)	3:41.5A	Sammy Mutai (KEN)	3:42.4A
5000 metres	Sammy Kipketer (KEN)	13:40.4A	David Kiplak (KEN)	13:43.6A	John Kosgei (KEN)	13:55.0A
10,000 metres	John Cheruiyot Korir (KEN)	28:29.6A	Sammy Kipketer (KEN)	28:30.5A	Paul Kosgei (KEN)	28:38.0A
110 metres hurdles	Daniel Kosgei (KEN)	14.5A	Ezzedine Belaïd (LBA)	14.9A	Mohamed Chouchal (MAR)	15.1A
400 metres hurdles	Vincent Mumo (KEN)	51.6A	Alioune Konaté (SEN)	51.8A	Hillary Maritim (KEN)	52.1A
3000 metres steeplechase	Wilson Boit Kipketer (KEN)	8:27.0A	John Kosgei (KEN)	8:47.7A	Gebremedhin Mariam (ETH)	8:57.7A
4×100 metres relay	Kenya (KEN)	40.5A	Botswana (BOT)	41.1A	Senegal (SEN)	42.6A
4×400 metres relay	Kenya (KEN)	3:04.8A	Senegal (SEN)	3:10.5A	Morocco (MAR)	3:10.9A
High jump	Onnanye Ramohube (BOT)	2.15 m A	Stanslaus Mutunga (KEN)	2.05 m A	Slim El Emdrsi (TUN)	1.95 m A
Long jump	Remmy Limo (KEN)	7.58 m A	Mbock Wandjel (CMR)	7.33 m A	Simon Munyao (KEN)	7.28 m A
Triple jump	Olivier Sanou (BUR)	16.74 m A	Remmy Limo (KEN)	16.14 m A	Mohamed Gomri (TUN)	15.09 m A
Shot put	Mkhululi Malvet Lebala (BOT)	12.86 m A	Tsegaye Woldesenbet (ETH)	12.59 m A	Kimeli Tanui (KEN)	12.13 m A
Discus throw	Hatem El Kébir (TUN)	48.16 m A	Kimeli Tanui (KEN)	48.12 m A	Abdullah Khalifa (LBA)	36.36 m A
Javelin throw	Peter Saina (KEN)	71.84 m A	Diro Tola (ETH)	63.85 m A	Mohamed Ali Ben Zina (TUN)	56.98 m A

=== Women ===
Event	Gold		Silver		Bronze	
100 metres	Maïssour Lohra (MAR)	12.0A	Touria Sadiki (MAR)	12.1A	Jacinta Wambui (KEN)	12.3A
200 metres	Jacinta Wambui (KEN)	24.6A	Maïssour Lohra (MAR)	24.9A	Elvin Mose (KEN)	25.3A
400 metres	Jacinta Wambui (KEN)	54.5A	Seltana Aït Hammou (MAR)	54.8A	Elvin Mose (KEN)	56.1A
800 metres	Seltana Aït Hammou (MAR)	2:06.9A	Anna Ndege (TAN)	2:08.4A	Charity Wandia (KEN)	2:13.9A
1500 metres	Naomi Mugo (KEN)	4:19.0A	Irene Limika (KEN)	4:20.0A	Anna Ndege (TAN)	4:20.2A
5000 metres	Irene Limika (KEN)	16:15.7A	Restituta Joseph (TAN)	16:19.8A	Nebiat Habtemariam (ERI)	17:31.6A
High jump	Dinah Heymans (RSA)	1.82 m A	Chelagat Belion (KEN)	1.55 m A	Only two athletes cleared a height	
Long jump	Touria Sadiki (MAR)	5.57 m A	Jemima Munyua (KEN)	5.38 m A	Zulfa Mohammed (TAN)	4.76 m A

== Medal table ==
* Host nation (Kenya)

Rank	Nation	Gold	Silver	Bronze	Total
1	Kenya (KEN)*	17	11	12	40
2	Morocco (MAR)	3	4	2	9
3	Botswana (BOT)	3	2	0	5
4	Tunisia (TUN)	1	0	3	4
5	Burkina Faso (BUR)	1	0	0	1
5	South Africa (RSA)	1	0	0	1
7	Senegal (SEN)	0	3	1	4
8	Tanzania (TAN)	0	2	2	4
9	Ethiopia (ETH)	0	2	1	3
10	Cameroon (CMR)	0	1	1	2
10	Libya (LBA)	0	1	1	2
12	Eritrea (ERI)	0	0	1	1
12	Sudan (SUD)	0	0	1	1
Totals (13 entries)		26	26	25	77

== See also ==
- 2002 in athletics (track and field)
