= Track and field at the 2011 Military World Games – Men's 400 metres =

The men's 400 metres event at the 2011 Military World Games was held on 20 and 21 July at the Estádio Olímpico João Havelange.

== Records ==
Prior to this competition, the existing world and CISM record were as follows:

World Record	Michael Johnson (USA)	43.18	Sevilla, Spain	26 August 1999
CISM World Record	David Kirui (KEN)	45.30	Tivoli, Italy	6 September 2002

== Schedule ==
Date	Time	Round
20 July 2011	11:55	Round 1
21 July 2011		Semifinals
21 July 2011	18:00	Final

== Medalists ==
Gold	Silver	Bronze
Sajjad Hashemi; Iran	Mark Mutai; Kenya	Arismendy Peguero; Dominican Republic

== Results ==
=== Final ===
Rank	Lane	Name	Nationality	Time	Notes
1st place, gold medalist(s)	8	Sajjad Hashemi	Iran	45.81	NR
2nd place, silver medalist(s)	4	Mark Mutai	Kenya	45.91	
3rd place, bronze medalist(s)	6	Arismendy Peguero	Dominican Republic	45.95	
4	5	Kacper Kozłowski	Poland	46.02	
5	1	Miguel Barton	Jamaica	46.45	
6	7	Marouane El-Maadadi	Morocco	46.54	
7	2	Piotr Klimczak	Poland	47.16	
	3	Yousef Masrahi	Saudi Arabia	DNF	
