= Athletics at the 2000 Summer Olympics – Men's 400 metres =

Men's 400 metres at the Games of the XXVII Olympiad
- Venue: Stadium Australia
- Dates: 22–25 September
- Competitors: 68 from 44 nations

Medalists
1st place, gold medalist(s)		Michael Johnson; United States
2nd place, silver medalist(s)		Alvin Harrison; United States
3rd place, bronze medalist(s)		Gregory Haughton; Jamaica

Video on YouTube Official Video Highlights @ 3:50

The men's 400 metres event at the 2000 Summer Olympics as part of the athletics programme was held at Stadium Australia from 22 to 25 September 2000. Sixty-eight athletes from 44 nations competed. The maximum number of athletes per nation had been set at 3 since the 1930 Olympic Congress. The event was won by 0.56 seconds by Michael Johnson of the United States, successfully defending his 1996 gold medal (the only man to do so in the history of the Olympic 400 metres race). It was the fifth in what would ultimately be 7 consecutive American victories stretching from 1984 to 2008 and the 17th overall title in the event by the United States. Gregory Haughton's bronze was Jamaica's first medal in the event since the nation won back-to-back golds in 1948 and 1952.

== Background ==
This was the 24th appearance of the event, which is one of 12 athletics events to have been held at every Summer Olympics. Five of the finalists from 1996 returned: defending gold medalist Michael Johnson and fourth-place finisher Alvin Harrison of the United States, bronze medalist Davis Kamoga of Uganda, seventh-place finisher Davian Clarke of Jamaica, and eight-place Ibrahim Ismail Muftah of Qatar. Johnson had stretched his world championship streak to 4, set a new world record, and was the (overwhelming) favorite again in 2000. Both of the other medalists (Sanderlei Parrela of Brazil and Alejandro Cárdenas of Mexico) from the 1999 worlds were in Sydney as well.

Following the breakup of the Soviet Union, Lithuania and Ukraine appeared in this event for the first time; Russia appeared for the first time since 1912. The United States made its 23rd appearance, most of any nation, having missed only the boycotted 1980 Games.

== Qualification ==
Each National Olympic Committee was permitted to enter up to three athletes that had run 45.80 seconds or faster during the qualification period. The maximum number of athletes per nation had been set at 3 since the 1930 Olympic Congress. If an NOC had no athletes that qualified under that standard, one athlete that had run 46.20 seconds or faster could be entered.

== Competition format ==
The competition retained the basic four-round format from 1920. The "fastest loser" system, introduced in 1964, was used for the first round. There were 9 first-round heats, each with 7 or 8 runners. The top three runners in each heat advanced, along with the next five fastest overall. The 32 quarterfinalists were divided into 4 quarterfinals with 8 runners each; the top four athletes in each quarterfinal heat advanced to the semifinals, with no "fastest loser" spots. The semifinals featured 2 heats of 8 runners each. The top four runners in each semifinal heat advanced, making an eight-man final.

== Records ==
These were the standing world and Olympic records (in seconds) prior to the 2000 Summer Olympics.

World record	Michael Johnson (USA)	43.18	Seville, Spain	26 August 1999
Olympic record	Michael Johnson (USA)	43.49	Atlanta, United States	29 July 1996

No world or Olympic records were set in this event.

The following national records were established during the competition:

Nation	Athlete	Round	Time
Haiti	Gerald Clervil	Heat 1	46.69
Saudi Arabia	Hamdan O Al-Bishi	Heat 8	45.22

== Schedule ==
Following the 1984 schedule, the event was held on four separate days, with each round being on a different day.

All times are Australian Eastern Standard Time (UTC+10)

Date	Time	Round
Friday, 22 September 2000	10:40	Round 1
Saturday, 23 September 2000	21:25	Quarterfinals
Sunday, 24 September 2000	21:00	Semifinals
Monday, 25 September 2000	20:25	Final

== Results ==
All times shown are in seconds.

=== Round 1 ===
==== Heat 1 ====
Rank	Lane	Athlete	Nation	Reaction	Time	Notes
1	1	Avard Moncur	Bahamas	0.266	45.23	Q
2	7	Daniel Caines	Great Britain	0.153	45.39	Q, PB
3	5	Casey Vincent	Australia	0.162	45.49	Q
4	3	Dmitriy Golovastov	Russia	0.234	45.90	q
5	2	Takahiko Yamamura	Japan	0.261	46.25	
6	4	Carlos Santa	Dominican Republic	0.169	46.40	
7	8	Piotr Rysiukiewicz	Poland	0.227	46.67	
8	6	Gerald Clervil	Haiti	0.556	46.69	NR

==== Heat 2 ====
Rank	Lane	Athlete	Nation	Reaction	Time	Notes
1	8	Jude Monye	Nigeria	0.220	45.79	Q
2	1	Patrick Dwyer	Australia	0.196 s	45.82 s	Q
3	5	Alejandro Cardenas	Mexico	0.143 s	46.14 s	Q
4	2	Neil de Silva	Trinidad and Tobago	0.220	46.84	
5	3	Gustavo Aguirre	Argentina	0.237	47.03	
6	3	Troy McIntosh	Bahamas	0.237	47.06	
—	7	Jonas Motiejūnas	Lithuania	0.220	DNF	
—	4	Kennedy Ochieng	Kenya	0.178	DNF	

==== Heat 3 ====
Rank	Lane	Athlete	Nation	Reaction	Time	Notes
1	4	Sanderlei Claro Parrela	Brazil	0.472	45.55	Q
2	3	Danny McFarlane	Jamaica	0.480	45.84	Q
3	3	Soufiene Labidi	Tunisia	0.252	45.84	Q
4	6	Jun Osakada	Japan	0.231	45.88	q
5	1	Tawanda Chiwira	Zimbabwe	0.203	46.50	
6	7	Nduka Awazie	Nigeria	0.319	46.81	
7	8	Johnson Kubisa	Botswana	0.387	46.97	
—	2	Evripedes Demosthenous	Cyprus	0.179	DNF	

==== Heat 4 ====
Rank	Lane	Athlete	Nation	Reaction	Time	Notes
1	8	Gregory Haughton	Jamaica	0.295	45.63	Q
2	2	David Kirui	Kenya	0.207	45.69	Q, PB
3	3	Marc Raquil	France	0.238	45.72	Q
4	7	Arnaud Malherbe	South Africa	0.200	45.73	q
5	6	Sunday Bada	Nigeria	0.554	45.75	q
6	5	Ato Modibo	Trinidad and Tobago	0.486	45.91	
7	4	Benjamin Youla	Democratic Republic of the Congo	0.183	47.54	
8	1	Iliya Dzhivondov	Bulgaria	0.200	48.64	

==== Heat 5 ====
Rank	Lane	Athlete	Nation	Reaction	Time	Notes
1	2	Hendrick Mokganyetsi	South Africa	0.209	45.22	Q
2	3	Piotr Haczek	Poland	0.248	45.61	Q, SB
3	7	Alessandro Attene	Italy	0.134	45.79	Q
4	4	Rohan Pradeep Kumara	Sri Lanka	0.499	46.00	
5	8	Salaheddine Bakar Al-Safi	Qatar	0.414	46.16	
6	5	Zsolt Szeglet	Hungary	0.176	46.19	
7	6	Jamie Baulch	Great Britain	0.164	46.52	

==== Heat 6 ====
Rank	Lane	Athlete	Nation	Reaction	Time	Notes
1	6	Alvin Harrison	United States	0.467	44.96	Q
2	5	Davian Clarke	Jamaica	0.204	45.30	Q
3	2	Robert Maćkowiak	Poland	0.236	45.39	Q
4	3	Anastasios Gousis	Greece	0.211	46.38	
5	7	Fawzi Al Shammari	Kuwait	0.157	46.38	
6	8	Paramjit Singh	India	0.188	46.64	
7	4	Philip Mukomana	Zimbabwe	0.503	47.11	

==== Heat 7 ====
Rank	Lane	Athlete	Nation	Reaction	Time	Notes
1	5	Michael Johnson	United States	0.176	45.25	Q
2	2	David Canal	Spain	0.189	45.53	Q, SB
3	3	Ibrahima Wade	France	0.262	45.72	Q
4	7	Malik Louahla	Algeria	0.158	46.06	
5	4	Sean Baldock	Great Britain	0.180	46.45	
6	8	Fabian Rollins	Barbados	0.447	46.85	
7	6	Oleksandr Kaydash	Ukraine	0.586	46.88	

==== Heat 8 ====
Rank	Lane	Athlete	Nation	Reaction	Time	Notes
1	4	Hamdan O Al-Bishi	Saudi Arabia	0.153	45.22	Q, NR
2	2	Sugath Thilakaratne	Sri Lanka	0.211	45.48	Q
3	1	Ibrahim Ismail Muftah	Qatar	0.234	45.48	Q
4	5	Eric Milazar	Mauritius	0.459	45.66	q
5	3	Štefan Balošák	Slovakia	0.192	46.42	
6	7	Kenji Tabata	Japan	0.143	46.59	
7	8	Rudieon Sylvan	Grenada	0.241	48.17	
8	6	Basheer Al-Khewani	Yemen	0.452	49.72	PB

==== Heat 9 ====
Rank	Lane	Athlete	Nation	Reaction	Time	Notes
1	3	Antonio Pettigrew	United States	0.328	45.62	Q
2	4	Christopher Brown	Bahamas	0.505	45.80	Q
3	6	Davis Kamoga	Uganda	0.625	45.92	Q, SB
4	7	Metija Sestak	Slovenia	0.295	45.95	
5	5	Tomas Coman	Ireland	0.263	46.17	
6	2	Juan Pedro Toledo	Mexico	0.282	46.82	
—	8	Daniel Batman	Australia	0.378	DNF	

==== Overall results for Round 1 ====
Rank	Athlete	Nation	Heat	Lane	Place	Time	Qual.	Record
1	Alvin Harrison	United States	6	6	1	44.96 s	Q	
2	Hamdan O Al-Bishi	Saudi Arabia	8	4	1	45.22 s	Q	NR
2	Hendrick Mokganyetsi	South Africa	5	2	1	45.22 s	Q	
4	Avard Moncur	Bahamas	1	1	1	45.23 s	Q	
5	Michael Johnson	United States	7	5	1	45.25 s	Q	
6	Davian Clarke	Jamaica	6	5	2	45.30 s	Q	
7	Daniel Caines	Great Britain	1	7	2	45.39 s	Q	PB
7	Robert Maćkowiak	Poland	6	2	3	45.39 s	Q	
9	Ibrahim Ismail Muftah	Qatar	8	1	3	45.48 s	Q	
9	Sugath Thilakaratne	Sri Lanka	8	2	2	45.48 s	Q	
11	Casey Vincent	Australia	1	5	3	45.49 s	Q	
12	David Canal	Spain	7	2	2	45.53 s	Q	SB
13	Sanderlei Claro Parrela	Brazil	3	4	1	45.55 s	Q	
14	Piotr Haczek	Poland	5	3	2	45.61 s	Q	SB
15	Antonio Pettigrew	United States	9	3	1	45.62 s	Q	
16	Gregory Haughton	Jamaica	4	8	1	45.63 s	Q	
17	Eric Milazar	Mauritius	8	5	4	45.66 s	q	
18	David Kipkorir Kirui	Kenya	4	2	2	45.69 s	Q	PB
19	Marc Raquil	France	4	3	3	45.72 s	Q	
19	Ibrahima Wade	France	7	3	3	45.72 s	Q	
21	Arnaud Malherbe	South Africa	4	7	4	45.73 s	q	
22	Sunday Bada	Nigeria	4	6	5	45.75 s	q	
23	Alessandro Attene	Italy	5	7	3	45.79 s	Q	
23	Jude Monye	Nigeria	2	8	1	45.79 s	Q	
25	Christopher Brown	Bahamas	8	4	2	45.80 s	Q	
26	Patrick Dwyer	Australia	2	1	2	45.82 s	Q	
27	Soufiene Labidi	Tunisia	3	3	3	45.84 s	Q	
27	Danny McFarlane	Jamaica	3	5	2	45.84 s	Q	
29	Jun Osakada	Japan	3	6	4	45.88 s	q	
30	Dmitriy Golovastov	Russia	1	3	4	45.90 s	q	
31	Ato Modibo	Trinidad and Tobago	4	5	6	45.91 s		
32	Davis Kamoga	Uganda	9	6	3	45.82 s	Q	SB
33	Matija Sestak	Slovenia	9	7	4	45.95 s		
34	Rhohan Pradeep Kumar	Sri Lanka	5	4	4	46.00 s		
35	Malik Louahla	Algeria	7	4	4	46.06 s		
36	Alejandro Cardenas	Mexico	2	5	3	46.14 s	Q	
37	Salaheldin E Bakkar	Qatar	5	8	5	46.16 s		
38	Tomas Coman	Ireland	9	5	5	46.17 s		
39	Zsolt Szeglet	Hungary	5	5	6	46.19 s		
40	Takahiko Yamamura	Japan	1	2	5	46.25 s		
41	Fawzi Al Shammari	Kuwait	6	7	5	46.38 s		
41	Anastasios Gousis	Greece	6	3	4	46.38 s		
43	Carlos Santa	Dominican Republic	1	4	6	46.40 s		
44	Štefan Balošák	Slovakia	8	3	5	46.42 s		
45	Sean Baldock	Great Britain	7	4	5	46.45 s		
46	Tawanda Chiwira	Zimbabwe	3	1	5	46.50 s		
47	Jamie Baulch	Great Britain	5	6	7	46.52 s		
48	Kenji Tabata	Japan	8	7	6	46.59 s		
49	Paramjit Singh	India	6	8	8	46.64 s		
50	Piotr Rysiukiewicz	Poland	1	8	7	46.67 s		
51	Gerald Clervil	Haiti	1	6	8	46.69 s		NR
52	Nduka Awazie	Nigeria	3	7	6	46.81 s		
53	Juan Pedro Toledo	Mexico	9	2	6	46.82 s		
54	Neil de Silva	Trinidad and Tobago	2	2	4	46.84 s		
55	Fabian Rollins	Barbados	7	8	6	46.85 s		
56	Oleksandr Kaydash	Ukraine	7	6	7	46.88 s		
57	Johnson Kubisa	Botswana	3	8	7	46.97 s		
58	Gustavo Aguirre	Argentina	2	3	5	47.03 s		
59	Troy McIntosh	Bahamas	2	6	6	47.06 s		
60	Philip Mukomana	Zimbabwe	6	4	7	47.11 s		
61	Benjamin Youla	Democratic Republic of the Congo	4	4	7	47.54 s		
62	Rudieon Sylvan	Grenada	8	8	7	48.17 s		
63	Iliya Dzhivondov	Bulgaria	4	1	8	48.64 s		
64	Basheer Al Khewani	Yemen	8	6	8	49.72 s		PB
-	Daniel Batman	Australia	9	8	-	DNF		
-	Evripedes Demosthenous	Cyprus	3	2	-	DNF		
-	Jonas Motiejunas	Lithuania	2	7	-	DNF		
-	Kennedy Ochieng	Kenya	2	4	-	DNF		

=== Quarterfinals ===
==== Quarterfinal 1 ====
Rank	Lane	Athlete	Nation	Reaction	Time	Notes
1	4	Michael Johnson	United States	0.150	45.31	Q
2	1	Piotr Haczek	Poland	0.251	45.43	Q, PB
3	5	Avard Moncur	Bahamas		45.43	Q
4	8	Casey Vincent	Australia	0.163	45.45	Q
5	7	Eric Milazar	Mauritius	0.364	45.52	
6	6	Sugath Thilakaratne	Sri Lanka	0.199	45.54	
7	3	David Canal	Spain	0.221	45.54	
8	2	Arnaud Malherbe	South Africa	0.192	45.59	

==== Quarterfinal 2 ====
Rank	Lane	Athlete	Nation	Reaction	Time	Notes
1	3	Davian Clarke	Jamaica	0.283	45.06	Q, SB
2	4	Antonio Pettigrew	United States	0.475	45.35	Q
3	6	Hamdan O Al-Bishi	Saudi Arabia	0.600	45.35	Q
4	8	Danny McFarlane	Jamaica	0.183	45.40	Q
5	7	Ibrahima Wade	France	0.223	45.61	
6	2	Davis Kamoga	Uganda	0.207	45.74	SB
7	5	David Kirui	Kenya		46.00	
8	1	Jun Osakada	Japan	0.217	46.15	

==== Quarterfinal 3 ====
Rank	Lane	Athlete	Nation	Reaction	Time	Notes
1	6	Alvin Harrison	United States	0.195	44.25	Q
2	4	Gregory Haughton	Jamaica	0.475	45.08	Q
3	7	Alessandro Attene	Italy	0.150	45.35	Q, PB
4	8	Patrick Dwyer	Australia	0.174	45.38	Q
5	1	Dmitriy Golovastov	Russia	0.184	45.66	
6	5	Christopher Brown	Bahamas	0.204	45.76	
7	2	Soufiene Labidi	Tunisia	0.215	46.01	
8	3	Jude Monye	Nigeria	0.203	46.32	

==== Quarterfinal 4 ====
Rank	Lane	Athlete	Nation	Reaction	Time	Notes
1	7	Robert Maćkowiak	Poland	0.194	45.01	Q, PB
2	4	Hendrick Mokganyetsi	South Africa	0.440	45.15	Q
3	5	Daniel Caines	Great Britain	0.161	45.37	Q, PB
4	3	Sanderlei Claro Parrela	Brazil	0.302	45.55	Q
5	2	Marc Raquil	France	0.224	45.56	
6	1	Alejandro Cardenas	Mexico	0.139	45.66	
7	8	Sunday Bada	Nigeria	0.226	45.83	
8	6	Ibrahim Ismail Muftah	Qatar	0.549	45.96	

==== Overall results for quarterfinals ====
Rank	Athlete	Nation	Heat	Lane	Place	Time	Qual.	Record
1	Alvin Harrison	United States	3	6	1	44.25 s	Q	
2	Robert Maćkowiak	Poland	4	7	1	45.01 s	Q	PB
3	Davian Clarke	Jamaica	2	3	1	45.06 s	Q	SB
4	Gregory Haughton	Jamaica	3	4	2	45.08 s	Q	
5	Hendrick Mokganyetsi	South Africa	4	4	2	45.15 s	Q	
6	Michael Johnson	United States	1	4	1	45.31 s	Q	
7	Hamdan O Al-Bishi	Saudi Arabia	2	6	3	45.35 s	Q	
7	Alessandro Attene	Italy	3	7	3	45.35 s	Q	PB
7	Antonio Pettigrew	United States	2	4	2	45.35 s	Q	
10	Daniel Caines	Great Britain	4	5	3	45.37 s	Q	PB
11	Patrick Dwyer	Australia	3	8	4	45.38 s	Q	
12	Danny McFarlane	Jamaica	2	8	4	45.40 s	Q	
13	Piotr Haczek	Poland	1	1	2	45.43 s	Q	PB
13	Avard Moncur	Bahamas	1	5	3	45.43 s	Q	
15	Casey Vincent	Australia	1	8	4	45.45 s	Q	
16	Eric Milazar	Mauritius	1	7	5	45.52 s		
17	David Canal	Spain	1	3	7	45.54 s		
17	Sugath Thilakaratne	Sri Lanka	1	6	6	45.54 s		
19	Sanderlei Claro Parrela	Brazil	4	3	4	45.55 s	Q	
20	Marc Raquil	France	4	2	5	45.56 s		
21	Arnaud Malherbe	South Africa	1	2	8	45.59 s		
22	Ibrahima Wade	France	2	7	5	45.61 s		
23	Alejandro Cardenas	Mexico	4	1	6	45.66 s		
23	Dmitriy Golovastov	Russia	3	1	5	45.66 s		
25	Davis Kamoga	Uganda	2	2	6	45.74 s		
26	Christopher Brown	Bahamas	3	5	6	45.76 s		
27	Sunday Bada	Nigeria	4	8	7	45.83 s		
28	Ibrahim Ismail Muftah	Qatar	4	6	8	45.96 s		
29	David Kirui	Kenya	2	5	7	46.00 s		
30	Soufiene Labidi	Tunisia	3	2	7	46.01 s		
31	Jun Osakada	Japan	2	1	8	46.15 s		
32	Jude Monye	Nigeria	3	3	8	46.32 s		

=== Semifinals ===
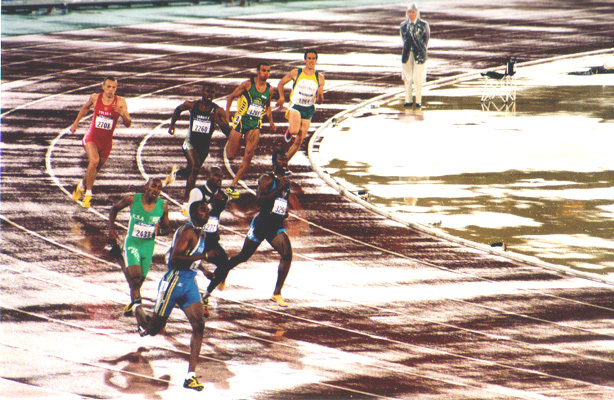
Semifinal 1

==== Semifinal 1 ====
Rank	Lane	Athlete	Nation	Reaction	Time	Notes
1	6	Alvin Harrison	United States	0.220	44.53	Q
2	5	Michael Johnson	United States	0.164	44.65	Q
3	3	Gregory Haughton	Jamaica	0.258	44.93	Q
4	2	Sanderlei Claro Parrela	Brazil	0.212	45.17	Q
5	8	Avard Moncur	Bahamas	0.198	45.18	
6	4	Piotr Haczek	Poland	0.470	45.66	
7	1	Patrick Dwyer	Australia	0.176	45.70	
8	7	Hamdan O Al-Bishi	Saudi Arabia	0.179	45.98	

==== Semifinal 2 ====
Rank	Lane	Athlete	Nation	Reaction	Time	Notes
1	4	Antonio Pettigrew	United States	0.499	45.24	Q
2	7	Danny McFarlane	Jamaica	0.253	45.38	Q
3	5	Hendrick Mokganyetsi	South Africa	0.529	45.52	Q
4	6	Robert Maćkowiak	Poland	0.192	45.53	Q
5	8	Daniel Caines	Great Britain	0.168	45.55	
6	2	Casey Vincent	Australia	0.229	45.61	
7	1	Alessandro Attene	Italy	0.221	46.41	
—	3	Davian Clarke	Jamaica	0.270	DNF	

==== Overall results for semifinals ====
Rank	Athlete	Nation	Heat	Lane	Place	Time	Qual.	Record
1	Alvin Harrison	United States	1	6	1	44.53 s	Q	
2	Michael Johnson	United States	1	5	2	44.65 s	Q	
3	Gregory Haughton	Jamaica	1	3	3	44.93 s	Q	
4	Sanderlei Claro Parrela	Brazil	1	2	4	45.17 s	Q	
5	Avard Moncur	Bahamas	1	8	5	45.18 s		
6	Antonio Pettigrew	United States	2	4	1	45.24 s	Q	
7	Danny McFarlane	Jamaica	2	7	2	45.38 s	Q	
8	Hendrick Mokganyetsi	South Africa	2	5	3	45.52 s	Q	
9	Robert Maćkowiak	Poland	2	6	4	45.53 s	Q	
10	Daniel Caines	Great Britain	2	8	5	45.55 s		
11	Casey Vincent	Australia	2	2	6	45.61 s		
12	Piotr Haczek	Poland	1	4	6	45.66 s		
13	Patrick Dwyer	Australia	1	1	7	45.70 s		
14	Hamdan O Al-Bishi	Saudi Arabia	1	7	8	45.98 s		
15	Alessandro Attene	Italy	2	1	7	46.41 s		
-	Davian Clarke	Jamaica	2	3		DNF		

=== Final ===
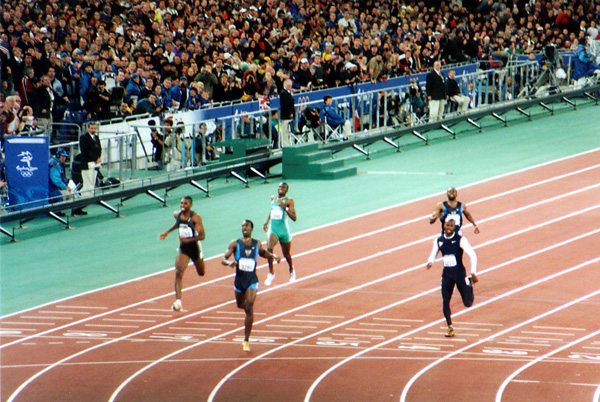
The finish of the race

Rank	Lane	Athlete	Nation	Reaction	Time	Notes
1st place, gold medalist(s)	6	Michael Johnson	United States	0.610	43.84	
2nd place, silver medalist(s)	4	Alvin Harrison	United States	0.490	44.40	
3rd place, bronze medalist(s)	8	Gregory Haughton	Jamaica	0.346	44.70	SB
4	2	Sanderlei Claro Parrela	Brazil	0.280	45.01	
5	1	Robert Maćkowiak	Poland	0.232	45.14	
6	7	Hendrick Mokganyetsi	South Africa	0.442	45.26	
7	3	Danny McFarlane	Jamaica	0.332	45.55	
—	5	Antonio Pettigrew	United States	0.576	45.42 DSQ	
