= 1997 World Championships in Athletics – Men's 400 metres =

Men's 400 metres at the 1997 World Championships
- Venue: Olympic Stadium
- Dates: 3 August (heats); 4 August (semi-finals); 5 August (final)
- Competitors: 50
- Winning time: 44.12

Medalists
gold medal	Michael Johnson	United States
silver medal	Davis Kamoga	Uganda
bronze medal	Tyree Washington	United States

These are the results of the Men's 400 metres event at the 1997 World Championships in Athletics in Athens, Greece. The winning margin was 0.25 seconds.

== Medalists ==
Gold	Michael Johnson; United States (USA)
Silver	Davis Kamoga; Uganda (UGA)
Bronze	Tyree Washington; United States (USA)

== Results ==
=== Heats ===
First 4 of each Heat (Q) and the next 4 fastest (q) qualified for the quarterfinals.

Rank	Heat	Name	Nationality	Time	Notes
1	6	Jerome Young	United States	45.34	Q
2	3	Sanderlei Claro Parrela	Brazil	45.35	Q
3	3	Tyree Washington	United States	45.35	Q
4	6	Mark Richardson	Great Britain	45.44	Q
5	3	Sugath Tillakeratne	Sri Lanka	45.58	Q, NR
6	3	Ibrahima Wade	Senegal	45.61	Q
7	4	Iwan Thomas	Great Britain	45.62	Q
8	5	Michael Johnson	United States	45.66	Q
9	3	Matthias Rusterholz	Switzerland	45.76	q, SB
10	4	Davian Clarke	Jamaica	45.77	Q
11	5	Eswort Coombs	Saint Vincent and the Grenadines	45.78	Q
12	6	Sunday Bada	Nigeria	45.79	Q
13	4	Tomasz Czubak	Poland	45.82	Q
14	5	Hachim Ndiaye	Senegal	45.84	Q
14	7	Štefan Balošák	Slovakia	45.84	Q
16	1	Jamie Baulch	Great Britain	45.85	Q
16	3	Jean-Louis Rapnouil	France	45.85	q
18	5	Kennedy Ochieng	Kenya	45.88	Q
18	6	Ibrahim Ismail Muftah	Qatar	45.88	Q
20	2	Michael McDonald	Jamaica	45.89	Q
21	5	Marco Vaccari	Italy	46.00	q
22	1	Roxbert Martin	Jamaica	46.04	Q
23	4	Arnaud Malherbe	South Africa	46.08	Q
24	1	Tawanda Chiwira	Zimbabwe	46.09	Q
25	7	Clement Chukwu	Nigeria	46.10	Q
26	7	Robert Maćkowiak	Poland	46.15	Q
27	2	Davis Kamoga	Uganda	46.17	Q
28	4	Samir-Adel Louahla	Algeria	46.22	q
29	2	Alejandro Cardenas	Mexico	46.26	Q
30	5	Odair da Costa	São Tomé and Príncipe	46.48	PB
31	6	Soloveni Nakaunicina	Fiji	46.51	
32	5	Jan Poděbradský	Czech Republic	46.52	
33	1	Benjamin Youla	Republic of the Congo	46.62	Q, NR
34	4	Konstantinos Moumoulidis	Greece	46.64	
35	1	Roman Galkin	Ukraine	46.82	
36	1	Antonio Andrés	Spain	46.94	
37	7	Rafik Elouardi	Austria	46.95	
38	6	Shigekazu Omori	Japan	47.09	
39	3	Kenmore Hughes	Antigua and Barbuda	47.11	SB
40	2	Shon Ju-Il	South Korea	47.47	Q
41	4	Evripides Demosthenous	Cyprus	47.57	
42	2	Liod Kgopong	South Africa	47.66	
43	2	Kendon Maynard	United States Virgin Islands	47.83	
44	7	Dennis Darling	Bahamas	47.96	
45	6	Eugene Farrell	Ireland	48.20	SB
46	7	Angelo Ignatius	Netherlands Antilles	49.01	
47	2	Mohsin Munir	Pakistan	49.61	
48	6	Bashir Mohamed Al Khewani	Yemen	50.96	
	7	Antonio Pettigrew	United States	DQ	Q
	1	Neil de Silva	Trinidad and Tobago	DNF	
	2	Jude Monye	Nigeria	DNS	

=== Quarterfinals ===
First 3 of each Heat (Q) and the next 4 fastest (q) qualified for the semifinals.

Rank	Heat	Name	Nationality	Time	Notes
1	4	Jerome Young	United States	44.87	Q
2	1	Iwan Thomas	Great Britain	44.98	Q
3	4	Mark Richardson	Great Britain	45.05	Q
4	2	Jamie Baulch	Great Britain	45.06	Q
4	3	Clement Chukwu	Nigeria	45.06	Q
6	3	Tyree Washington	United States	45.09	Q
7	4	Michael McDonald	Jamaica	45.16	Q
8	2	Davis Kamoga	Uganda	45.25	Q
9	1	Robert Maćkowiak	Poland	45.26	Q, NR
10	3	Davian Clarke	Jamaica	45.27	Q
11	1	Roxbert Martin	Jamaica	45.37	q
11	4	Sunday Bada	Nigeria	45.37	q, SB
13	2	Ibrahima Wade	Senegal	45.38	Q
14	2	Michael Johnson	United States	45.39	q
15	4	Tomasz Czubak	Poland	45.41	q, PB
16	3	Hachim Ndiaye	Senegal	45.44	PB
17	2	Eswort Coombs	Saint Vincent and the Grenadines	45.47	
18	1	Štefan Balošák	Slovakia	45.48	
19	1	Matthias Rusterholz	Switzerland	45.89	
20	3	Sugath Tillakeratne	Sri Lanka	46.11	
21	4	Ibrahim Ismail Muftah	Qatar	46.12	
22	2	Jean-Louis Rapnouil	France	46.14	
23	2	Tawanda Chiwira	Zimbabwe	46.22	
24	4	Samir-Adel Louahla	Algeria	46.23	
25	3	Kennedy Ochieng	Kenya	46.28	
26	2	Benjamin Youla	Republic of the Congo	46.29	NR
27	3	Marco Vaccari	Italy	46.32	
28	1	Alejandro Cardenas	Mexico	46.63	
29	4	Arnaud Malherbe	South Africa	46.73	
30	1	Shon Ju-Il	South Korea	47.36	
	1	Antonio Pettigrew	United States	DQ	Q
	3	Sanderlei Claro Parrela	Brazil	DNS	

=== Semifinals ===
First 4 of each Semifinal qualified directly (Q) for the final.

Rank	Heat	Name	Nationality	Time	Notes
1	2	Michael Johnson	United States	44.37	Q
2	2	Jerome Young	United States	44.50	Q, SB
3	2	Davis Kamoga	Uganda	44.57	Q, SB
4	1	Tyree Washington	United States	44.61	Q
4	2	Iwan Thomas	Great Britain	44.61	Q
6	1	Mark Richardson	Great Britain	44.62	Q, SB
7	1	Jamie Baulch	Great Britain	44.69	Q, SB
8	1	Davian Clarke	Jamaica	45.07	
9	2	Clement Chukwu	Nigeria	45.26	
10	1	Ibrahima Wade	Senegal	45.47	
11	2	Roxbert Martin	Jamaica	45.49	
12	2	Tomasz Czubak	Poland	45.51	
13	2	Michael McDonald	Jamaica	45.74	
14	1	Sunday Bada	Nigeria	45.96	
	1	Antonio Pettigrew	United States	DQ	Q
	1	Robert Maćkowiak	Poland	DNS	

=== Final ===
Rank	Lane	Name	Nationality	Time	Notes
1st place, gold medalist(s)	4	Michael Johnson	United States	44.12	
2nd place, silver medalist(s)	7	Davis Kamoga	Uganda	44.37	NR
3rd place, bronze medalist(s)	3	Tyree Washington	United States	44.39	PB
4	5	Mark Richardson	Great Britain	44.47	PB
5	6	Jerome Young	United States	44.51	
6	2	Iwan Thomas	Great Britain	44.52	
7	1	Jamie Baulch	Great Britain	45.22	
	8	Antonio Pettigrew	United States	DQ	
