= Athletics at the African Military Games =

African Military Games event

- Athletics
- Frequency: Every ten years
- Inaugurated: 2002 (Kenya) Nairobi
- Most recent: 2024 (Nigeria) Abuja
- Best: Kenya (KEN)

Athletics is an African Military Games event ever since the inaugural edition in Nairobi, Kenya, at the 2002 African Military Games, and has continued to feature prominently at the competition in each of its subsequent editions.

== Editions ==
Games	Year	Host	Events			Best nation
Games	Year	Host	Men	Women	Mixed	Best nation
I	2002	Nairobi	18	8	—N/a	Kenya
–	2006	Tunis	Canceled			
–	2012	Abuja	Canceled			
II	2024	Abuja				

== Medal table ==
- Last updated after the 2002 edition.

Rank	Nation	Gold	Silver	Bronze	Total
1	Kenya (KEN)	17	11	12	40
2	Morocco (MAR)	3	4	2	9
3	Botswana (BOT)	3	2	0	5
4	Tunisia (TUN)	1	0	3	4
5	Burkina Faso (BUR)	1	0	0	1
5	South Africa (RSA)	1	0	0	1
7	Senegal (SEN)	0	3	1	4
8	Tanzania (TAN)	0	2	2	4
9	Ethiopia (ETH)	0	2	1	3
10	Cameroon (CMR)	0	1	1	2
10	Libya (LBA)	0	1	1	2
12	Eritrea (ERI)	0	0	1	1
12	Sudan (SUD)	0	0	1	1
Totals (13 entries)		26	26	25	77
