= 2002 World Military Track and Field Championships =

40th World Military Track and Field Championship
- Dates: 4 – 7 September
- Host city: Tivoli, Lazio, Italy
- Events: 30 (plus 2 marathons)

The 2002 World Military Track and Field Championships were the 40th edition of the international athletics competition between military personnel organised by the CISM (International Military Sports Council). The championships were held in Tivoli, Lazio, Italy from 4–7 September. A total of 30 events were contested, of which 21 by male and 9 by female athletes.

In addition to the track and field competition, the World Military Marathon Championships were held separately on 13–17 June in the Canton of Bern in Switzerland.

The host, Italy, won the most medals, with ten gold medals and twenty medals in total across the two events. Kenya was the runner-up with seven golds in sixteen medals and Germany took third with five golds among its haul of fourteen. Twenty nations reached the medal table in the track and field and marathon competitions.

== Medal summary ==
=== Men ===
Event	Gold		Silver		Bronze	
100 metres	Francesco Scuderi (ITA)	10.67	Maurizio Checcucci (ITA)	10.75	Rafael de Araújo (BRA)	10.86
200 metres	Marco Torrieri (ITA)	20.71	Emanuele Di Gregorio (ITA)	21.04	Radek Zachoval (CZE)	21.20
400 metres	David Kirui (KEN)	45.30 CR	Flávio Godoy (BRA)	45.67	Sofiane Labidi (TUN)	45.74
800 metres	Joseph Mutua (KEN)	1:45.72	Michael Rotich (KEN)	1:45.98	Bram Som (NED)	1:46:49
1500 metres	Robert Rono (KEN)	3:42.51	Abdelkader Hachlaf (MAR)	3:42.94	David Kiplak (KEN)	3:43.12
5000 metres	Sammy Kipketer (KEN)	13:19.87	Paul Malakwen Kosgei (KEN)	13:20.92	Rachid Chékhémani (FRA)	13:38.79
10.000 metres	John Cheruiyot Korir (KEN)	28:02.69	Paul Malakwen Kosgei (KEN)	28:21.48	Mohammed Yagoub (SUD)	28:50.25
110 metres hurdles	Mike Fenner (GER)	13.56	Artur Kohutek (POL)	13.57	Devis Favaro (ITA)	13.80
400 metres hurdles	Fabrizio Mori (ITA)	49.37	Ruslan Mashchenko (RUS)	49.40	Štěpán Tesařík (CZE)	49.69
3000 metres steeplechase	Abraham Cherono (KEN)	8:27.17	Wilson Boit Kipketer (KEN)	8:34.31	Raphael Schäfer (GER)	8:39.17
4×100 metres relay	Italy (ITA); Francesco Scuderi; Maurizio Checcucci; Emanuele Di Gregorio; Marco Torrieri	39.43	Kenya (KEN)	40.37	Brazil (BRA)	40.76
4×400 metres relay	Kenya (KEN); Victor Kibet; Joseph Mutua; Michael Rotich; David Kirui	3:06.02	Czech Republic (CZE)	3:06.85	Senegal (SEN)	3:11.44
Marathon	Kamal Saidou (MAR)	?	Gino Van Geyte (BEL)	?	Alex de Mendonca (BRA)	?
10 km walk	Aigars Fadejevs (LAT)	39:58.25	Vladimir Andreyev (RUS)	40:08.27	Alessandro Gandellini (ITA)	40:09.37
High jump	Nicola Ciotti (ITA)	2.25 m	Tomáš Janků (CZE)	2.23 m	Svatoslav Ton (CZE)	2.23 m
Pole vault	Giuseppe Gibilisco (ITA)	5.50 m	Adam Ptáček (CZE)	5.40 m	Marvin Osei-Tutu (GER)	5.30 m
Long jump	Petr Lampart (CZE)	7.87 m	Andreas Pohle (GER)	7.68 m	Alessio Rimoldi (ITA)	7.66 m
Triple jump	Fabrizio Donato (ITA)	16.75 m	Aleksandr Sergeyev (RUS)	16.59 m	Thomas Moede (GER)	16.43 m
Shot put	Ralf Bartels (GER)	20.20 m	Paolo Dal Soglio (ITA)	20.02 m	Milan Haborák (SVK)	19.18 m
Discus throw	Igor Primc (SLO)	61.07 m	Jo Van Daele (BEL)	59.16 m	Aleksandr Borichevskiy (RUS)	59.04 m
Hammer throw	Nicola Vizzoni (ITA)	77.80 m	Markus Esser (GER)	76.08 m	Pavel Sedláček (CZE)	76.01 m
Javelin throw	Mark Frank (GER)	81.88 m	Christian Nicolay (GER)	78.65 m	Gregor Högler (AUT)	77.85 m^{[a]}

- ^{a} Gregor Högler's throw is listed as 75.77 m in the original results, but listed as 77.85 in Tilastopaja results with fourth placed Pekka Alaräisänen recording 77.11 m.

=== Women ===
Event	Gold		Silver		Bronze	
100 metres	Manuela Grillo (ITA)	11.80	Francesca Cola (ITA)	11.99	Priscilla Isiao (KEN)	12.40
200 metres	Birgit Rockmeier (GER)	23.74	Svetlana Goncharenko (RUS)	24.08	Awatef Ben Hassine (TUN)	24.38
400 metres	Awatef Ben Hassine (TUN)	52.74	Natalya Lavshuk (RUS)	53.00	Birgit Rockmeier (GER)	53.11
800 metres	Brigita Langerholc (SLO)	2:03.11	Elena Antoci (ROM)	2:03.45	Seltana Aït Hammou (MAR)	2:03.60
1500 metres	Elena Antoci (ROM)	4:11.87	Naomi Mugo (KEN)	4:14.64	Brigitte Mühlbacher (AUT)	4:17.31
5000 metres	Sabrina Mockenhaupt (GER)	15:16.32	Zhor El Kamch (MAR)	15:22.05	Naomi Mugo (KEN)	15:29.81
400 metres hurdles	Monika Niederstätter (ITA)	56.27	Lara Rocco (ITA)	57.69	Yekaterina Bakhvalova (RUS)	58.26
Marathon	N. Guihot (FRA)	?	T. Hiscock (CAN)	?	S. Cote (CAN)	?
5 km walk	Yelena Nikolayeva (RUS)	20:54.65	Melanie Seeger (GER)	21:08.38	Rossella Giordano (ITA)	21:27.41
Long jump	Anna Pyatykh (RUS)	6.16 m	Katja Keller (GER)	6.07 m	Monica Falchi (ITA)	6.06 m

== Medal table ==
* Host nation (Italy)

Rank	Nation	Gold	Silver	Bronze	Total
1	Italy*	10	5	5	20
2	Kenya	7	6	3	16
3	Germany	5	5	4	14
4	Russia	2	5	2	9
5	Slovenia	2	0	0	2
6	Czech Republic	1	3	4	8
7	Morocco	1	2	1	4
8	Romania	1	1	0	2
9	Tunisia	1	0	2	3
10	France	1	0	1	2
11	Latvia	1	0	0	1
12	Belgium	0	2	0	2
13	Brazil	0	1	3	4
14	Canada	0	1	1	2
15	Poland	0	1	0	1
16	Austria	0	0	2	2
17	Netherlands	0	0	1	1
17	Senegal	0	0	1	1
17	Slovakia	0	0	1	1
17	Sudan	0	0	1	1
Totals (20 entries)		32	32	32	96

== Participation ==
- Austria
- Belgium
- Brazil
- Canada
- Czech Republic
- France
- Finland
- Germany
- Greece
- Italy
- Kenya
- Latvia
- Lithuania
- Morocco
- Netherlands
- Poland
- Qatar
- Romania
- Russia
- Slovenia
- Senegal
- Sudan
- Switzerland
- Slovakia
- Tunisia
