= Remmy Limo =

Kenyan triple jumper

Remmy Kimutai Limo (born 25 August 1971) is a retired Kenyan athlete who specialized in the triple jump.

== International competitions ==
Year	Competition	Venue	Position	Notes
1996	Olympic Games	Atlanta, United States	37th (qualifiers)	Long jump
1998	Commonwealth Games	Kuala Lumpur, Malaysia	3rd	Triple jump
1999	All-Africa Games	Johannesburg, South Africa]	2nd	Triple jump
1999	Military World Games	Zagreb, Croatia	1st	Triple jump
1999	World Championships	Seville, Spain	17th (qualifying)	Triple jump
2002	Africa Military Games	Nairobi, Kenya	1st	Triple jump

== Personal bests ==
- Long jump - 8.02 m (26 ft 3 1/2 in) (1998)
- Triple jump - 16.89 m (55 ft 4 3/4 in) (1998)
