= Robert Rono =

Kenyan middle-distance runner

Robert Rono (born 16 August 1978) is a Kenyan former middle-distance runner who specialized in the 1500 metres. He was the gold medallist in that event at the 2002 Africa Military Games and took this success to the global level with a win at the 2002 World Military Track and Field Championships later that year. He was runner-up to Paul Korir at the 2003 All-Africa Games.

== International competitions ==
| Year | Competition | Venue | Position | Notes |
|---|---|---|---|---|
| 2002 | Africa Military Games | Nairobi, Kenya | 1st | |
| 2003 | All-Africa Games | Abuja, Nigeria | 2nd | |
| 2003 | World Athletics Final | Monte Carlo, Monaco | 7th | |

=== Personal bests ===
- 1500 metres - 3:30.99 min (2002)
- Mile run - 3:50.98 min (2003)
