= Football at the African Military Games =

- Founded: 2002
- Region: Africa (OSMA)
- Current champions: Algeria (1st title)
- Most championships: Algeria; Eritrea (1 title each)

Association football, more commonly known as football or soccer, has been played in the African Military Games since the first edition in 2002 as a men's competition sport.

== History ==
The first edition was held in 2002 in Nairobi, Kenya with participation of seven teams. Eritrea military team wins the tournament beating Guinea in the final. In the second edition of 2022 in Abuja, Nigeria. Only four teams took part in the tournament.

== Tournaments ==
Year	Host	Final			Third Place Match		
Year	Host	Champions	Score	Runners-Up	Third Place	Score	Fourth Place
2002; Details	(Kenya) Nairobi	Eritrea	2–2 (a.e.t.) (8–7 p)	Guinea	Rwanda	2–0	Lesotho
2006	(Tunisia) Tunis	Not held					
2012	(Nigeria) Abuja	Not held					
2024; Details	(Nigeria) Abuja	Algeria	1–0 (a.e.t.)	Cameroon	Nigeria	4–0	Equatorial Guinea

== Medal table ==
Rank	Nation	Gold	Silver	Bronze	Total
1	Algeria	1	0	0	1
1	Eritrea	1	0	0	1
3	Cameroon	0	1	0	1
3	Guinea	0	1	0	1
5	Nigeria	0	0	1	1
5	Rwanda	0	0	1	1
Totals (6 entries)		2	2	2	6

== Participating nations ==
Numbers refer to the final placing of each team at the respective Games.

Nation	(Kenya) 02	(Nigeria) 24	Years
Algeria		1	1
Cameroon		2	1
Equatorial Guinea		4	1
Eritrea	1		1
Guinea	2		1
Kenya	GS		1
Lesotho	4		1
Nigeria		3	1
Rwanda	3		1
South Africa	GS		1
Uganda	GS		1
Total nations (11)	7	4	

== See also ==
- African Military Cup
