= Benjamin Maiyo =

Kenyan long-distance runner

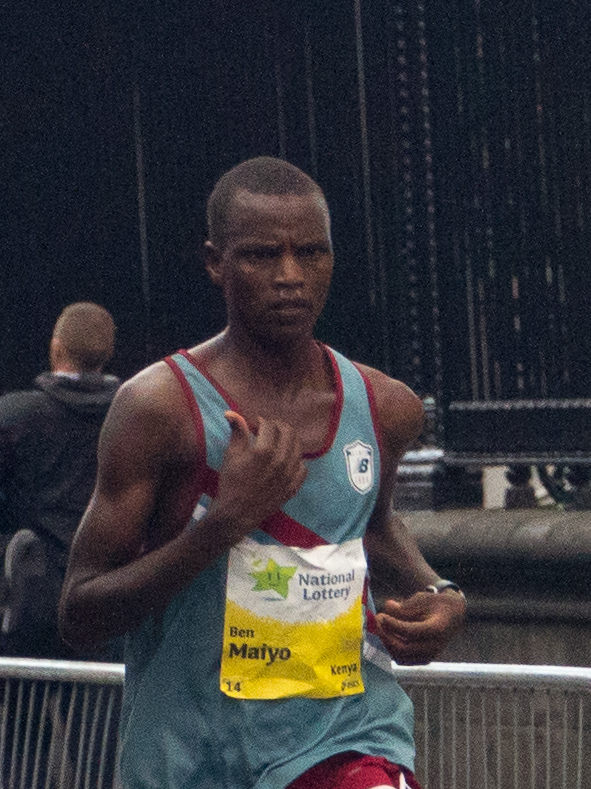

Medal record

Men's athletics

Representing Kenya

African Championships
Bronze medal – third place	2002 Radès	10,000 m

Goodwill Games
Silver medal – second place	2001 Brisbane	10,000 m

Benjamin Maiyo (born 6 October 1978) is a Kenyan long-distance runner who competes in the marathon.

He began his career as a track specialist in the 5000 metres and 10,000 metres. He ran in the 10,000 m final at the 1999 World Championships in Athletics and finished in seventh place. He achieved his 5000 m best of 13:02.28 minutes at the Athletissima meeting in 2000 and ran his 10,000 m best of 27:07.55 minutes in Palo Alto, California the following year. In the longer event, he won a silver medal behind Assefa Mezgebu at the 2001 Goodwill Games and was the bronze medallist at the 2002 African Championships in Athletics.

He switched to road running in 2004: he won the Bay to Breakers 12 km race, and made his debut in the marathon in Chicago, finishing ninth overall. He was the runner-up twice in 2005, coming second at the Los Angeles Marathon and then at the Chicago Marathon. In the latter race he ran his personal best time of 2:07:09 hours, which was the third fastest time that year behind Chicago winner Felix Limo and Haile Gebrselassie. Maiyo was runner-up for a third consecutive time at the 2006 Boston Marathon, finishing in 2:08:21. He ran in Boston and Chicago in 2007, reaching the top six at both, and was among the top eight runners at the Amsterdam Marathon and Frankfurt Marathon in 2008.

He is coached by Dieter Hogen and is part of the KIMbia Athletics stable of runners.
