= Anna Ndege =

Tanzanian middle-distance runner

Anna Ndege (born 5 March 1982 in Shinyanga) is a Tanzanian middle-distance runner. Her personal best of 4:09.71 minutes for the 1500 metres is the Tanzanian record for the distance.

Her best result was a nineteenth place in the short race at the 2001 World Cross Country Championships. She twice represented Tanzania at the competition at senior level, running in the short race in 2001 and 2002. She competed at the 2002 Commonwealth Games, running in both the 800 metres and 1500 metres events. She was a minor medallist in both those distances at the Africa Military Games.
