= John Cheruiyot Korir =

Kenyan long-distance runner

Personal information
- Born: 13 December 1981 (age 44)
Medal record
Men's athletics
Representing Kenya
African Championships
Silver medal – second place	2002 Radès	10,000 m
Military World Games
Gold medal – first place	2007 Hyderabad	10,000 m
World Military Championships
Gold medal – first place	2002 Tivoli	10,000 m

John Cheruiyot Korir (born 13 December 1981) is a Kenyan athlete who specializes in long-distance running. He is known to be an athlete who often shines at trials but fails to win big competitions.

== Career ==
He was born in Kiramwok, Bomet District. He began running in 1994, while still at primary school. He graduated from the Merigi Secondary School in 1998. He enlisted in the Kenyan Army in 2001. He is a member of the Kipsigis people, a Kalenjin sub-tribe.

John Cheruiyot Korir is not to be confused with John Kipsang Korir, who mainly competes in U.S. races. The two have competed against each other couple of times. At the 2002 Lisbon Half Marathon, Kipsang Korir was better, while Cheruiyot Korir beat his namesake at a cross country event in Kenya in 2003. At the 2005 Cherry Blossom 10-Mile Run, John Cheruiyot Korir was fifth in an event won by John Kipsang Korir.

His manager is Gianni Demadonna. He is coached by Renato Canova.

== International competitions ==
Year	Competition	Venue	Position	Event	Notes
Representing Kenya
2000	World Cross Country Championships	Vilamoura, Portugal	3rd	Junior	
2000	Summer Olympics	Sydney, Australia	5th	10,000 m	27:24.75
2001	World Cross Country Championships	Ostend, Belgium	28th	Long race	
2001	World Championships	Edmonton, Canada	8th	10,000 m	27:58.06
2002	African Military Games	Nairobi, Kenya	1st	10,000 m	
2002	Commonwealth Games	Manchester, England	4th	10,000 m	27:45.83
2002	African Championships	Tunis, Tunisia	2nd	10,000 m	28:45.23
2002	World Military Championships	Tivoli, Italy	1st	10,000 m	
2003	World Cross Country Championships	Lausanne, Switzerland	6th	Long race	
2003	World Championships	Paris, France	5th	10,000 m	27:19.94
2003	World Half Marathon Championships	Vilamoura, Portugal	4th	Half marathon	1:01:02
2004	World Cross Country Championships	Brussels, Belgium	11th	Long race	
2004	Olympic Games	Athens, Greece	6th	10,000 m	27:41.91
2004	World Half Marathon Championships	New Delhi, India	4th	Half marathon	1:02:38
2005	World Cross Country Championships	Saint-Galmier, France	9th	Long race	
2006	African Championships	Bambous, Mauritius	4th	10,000 m	28:10.83
2007	World Military Games	Hyderabad, India	1st	10,000 m	28:13.52
2008	African Championships	Addis Ababa, Ethiopia	4th	10,000 m	29:07.33

== Personal bests ==
Track

- 3000 metres: 7:43.35 (2000)
- 5000 metres: 13:09.58 (2000)
- 10,000 metres: 26:52.87 (2002)

Road

- 10K run: 27:49 (2005)
- 15 kilometres: 43:26 (2003)
- Half marathon: 1:00:47 (2004)
