= Football at the 2024 African Military Games =

Men's Football Tournament at the 2024 African Military Games
Tournament details
- Host country: Nigeria
- City: Abuja
- Dates: 21 – 23 November
- Teams: 4 (from 1 confederation)
- Venue: 1 (in 1 host city)

Final positions
- Champions: Algeria
- Runners-up: Cameroon
- Third place: Nigeria

The Men's football tournament at the 2024 African Military Games was held in Abuja in Nigeria from 21 to 23 November. It's the second edition of the African Military Games football tournament.

== Participating teams ==
Four teams took part in the tournament.

- Algeria
- Cameroon
- Equatorial Guinea
- Nigeria (hosts)

== Venues ==
The tournament was held in Moshood Abiola National Stadium in Abuja. With a capacity of 60 491 spectators.

Abuja	Football at the 2024 African Military Games is located in Nigeria
Moshood Abiola National Stadium	Football at the 2024 African Military Games is located in Nigeria
Capacity: 60,491	Football at the 2024 African Military Games is located in Nigeria

== Tournament ==
All times local: GMT (UTC)

Semi-finals
21 November – Abuja
Nigeria	0
Cameroon (a.e.t.)	1
21 November – Abuja
Algeria	2
Equatorial Guinea	0

Final
23 November – Abuja
Nigeria	4
Equatorial Guinea	0
Third place
23 November – Abuja
Cameroon	0
Algeria (a.e.t.)	1

=== Semi-finals ===
21 November 2024
17:00

Nigeria	0–1 (a.e.t.)	Cameroon
	Report	Ntouda 120'

Moshood Abiola National Stadium, Abuja

21 November 2024
19:00

Algeria	2–0	Equatorial Guinea
Belkhir; Benzid	Report

Moshood Abiola National Stadium, Abuja

=== Bronze medal match ===
23 November 2024
17:30

Nigeria	4–0	Equatorial Guinea
Gbaa; ?; ?; ?	Report

Moshood Abiola National Stadium, Abuja

=== Gold medal match ===
23 November 2024
21:00

Cameroon	0–1 (a.e.t.)	Algeria
	Report	Benzid 119'

Moshood Abiola National Stadium, Abuja

== Final standings ==
Pos	Team	Pld	W	D	L	GF	GA	GD	Pts	Final result
1st place, gold medalist(s)	Algeria	2	2	0	0	3	0	+3	6	Gold medal
2nd place, silver medalist(s)	Cameroon	2	1	0	1	1	1	0	3	Silver medal
3rd place, bronze medalist(s)	Nigeria (H)	2	1	0	1	4	1	+3	3	Bronze medal
4	Equatorial Guinea	2	0	0	2	0	6	−6	0	Fourth place

Source: amga2024
(H) Hosts
