= Ibrahim Jeilan =

Ethiopian long-distance runner (born 1989)

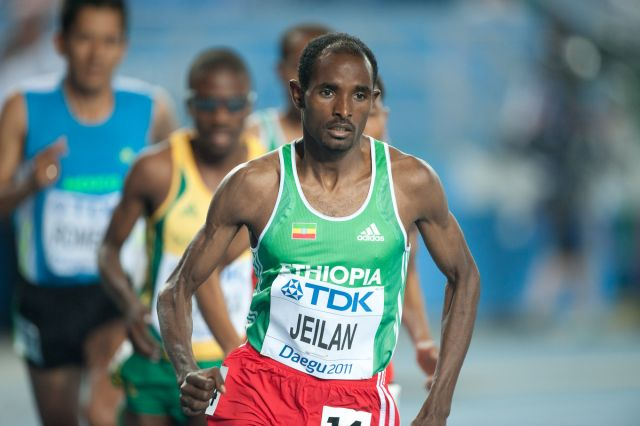
- Ibrahim at 2011 World Championships Men's 10,000 metres

Personal information
- Born: 11 June 1989 (age 37) Bale Province, Ethiopia

Sport
- Country: Ethiopia
- Club: Team Honda
Medal record
Men's athletics
Representing Ethiopia
World Championships
Gold medal – first place	2011 Daegu	10,000 m
Silver medal – second place	2013 Moscow	10,000 m
All-Africa Games
Gold medal – first place	2011 Maputo	10,000 m
African Championships
Silver medal – second place	2008 Addis Ababa	10,000 m
World Junior Championships
Gold medal – first place	2006 Beijing	10,000 m
Bronze medal – third place	2008 Bydgoszcz	10,000 m
World Cross Country Championships
Gold medal – first place	2008 Edinburgh	Junior race

Ibrahim Jeilan Gashu (Amharic: ዒብራሂም ጅእላን ጋሹ; born 12 June 1989) is an Ethiopian professional long-distance runner who specialises in the 5000 metres and 10,000 metres on the track, as well as cross country running. He is a former world champion in 10,000 metres.

After winning silver at the 2005 World Youth Championships, he rose to prominence in 2006 by winning the Ethiopian 10,000 m title and a gold at the IAAF World Junior Championships in Athletics. He then ran a world youth best of 27:02.81 over 10,000 m – also the second best ever run by a junior after Samuel Wanjiru.

After an underwhelming 2007 season he scored greater success in 2008, becoming the 2008 World Junior Cross Country Champion and then taking the 10,000 m silver at the African Championships. He also won the long-running Giro di Castelbuono road race in Italy. He failed to continue this form the following year and ran only a handful of major races, including the Beach to Beacon 10K.

He is currently based on Saitama, Japan and coached by Kiyoshi Akimoto.

== Career ==
=== Early life and junior career ===
A native of the Bale Province, Ethiopia, he became attracted to the idea of professional running after seeing his countryman Haile Gebrselassie beat Paul Tergat to win gold at the 2000 Sydney Olympics. He began competing internationally for his country at the age of 16 and he won the 3000 metres silver medal at the 2005 World Youth Championships in Athletics, finishing behind compatriot Abreham Cherkos. That November he competed at the Great Ethiopian Run and finished fourth, setting a 10 km road best of 28:45.99. The following year he took fifth place in the junior race at the 2006 IAAF World Cross Country Championships, helping the Ethiopian juniors, led by Tariku Bekele, to the team silver medal. Success on the track followed soon after as he won the Ethiopian title in the 10,000 metres, beating Tadesse Tola, and then won gold in the event at the 2006 World Junior Championships in Athletics He took part in the 10,000 m at the Memorial van Damme in Brussels and was fourth in a high calibre field, setting a world youth best of 27:02.81 in the process.

In January 2007, he helped his club (Muger Cement Sports Club) to second place at the Ethiopian Marathon Relay Championships, then went on to win the Cross de San Sebastián in Spain. In spite of this, the 2007 season was marked by a series of setbacks for Jeilan. He failed to finish the junior race at the 2007 IAAF World Cross Country Championships in Mombasa, later saying that "heat and the heaviness of the air suffocated me". He also lost his national title on the track, failing to reach the top three at the Ethiopian Championships. His performances on the track circuit were modest – his tenth place at the Golden Gala was almost ten seconds off his previous season's performance while a 10,000 m appearance at the FBK Games saw him placed 17th and run more than 45 seconds off his best.

He returned to good form in 2008: he won the national junior cross country title but remarked (in reference to his poor 2007) "I had some personal problems which I do not want to speak about. The problems still exist but I hope they can be solved". At the 2007 IAAF World Cross Country Championships he dispelled the memory of his previous year by becoming the world junior champion, using a combination of tactics and fast finishing to win the race. This completed an Ethiopian sweep of all four titles at the championship. The withdrawal of Kenenisa Bekele from the 2008 African Championships in Athletics left a berth which Ibrahim filled. He formed part of a three-man Ethiopian sweep of the medals, taking the silver behind Gebregziabher Gebremariam.

He started well on the circuit, managing fourth at the FBK Games then finishing as runner-up at the Prefontaine Classic, behind Kenenisa Bekele who ran virtually solo for the fourth fastest ever time. He attempted to defend his world junior 10,000 m title but was out-raced by Kenyans Josphat Kipkoech Bett and Titus Mbishei thus had to settle for the bronze medal. He won the Giro di Castelbuono 10K road race in Sicily in July, and brought his track season to a close two weeks later with an anticlimactic 15th at the Memorial van Damme. He ran at the São Silvestre de Luanda in Angola that December and won the 15 km race in course record time.

=== 2009-Present ===
His 2009 was low-key – moving beyond the junior ranks, he competed at no major championships. In June he was 14th at the FBK Games, and then recorded 27:22.19 in the 10,000 m for fourth place in Utrecht two weeks later. A third-place finish at the Beach to Beacon 10K in a personal best 28:20 proved to be the highlight of his season. His disappointment at not being selected for the 2009 World Championships in Athletics led him to change his location, as he decided to move to Saitama in Japan to work with the Honda corporate running team.

In his sole outing over 10,000 m in 2010 he ran 27:12.43 minutes – the sixth fastest that year. At the beginning of 2011 he won his stage of the New Year Ekiden. A 10,000 m run in 27:09.02 minutes saw him gain selection for the 2011 World Championships in Athletics in Daegu. Ibrahim caused an upset in the 10,000 m final by overhauling Mo Farah in the final stages of the race to win the gold medal. Farah had been undefeated up until that point that year while Ibrahim had come from relative obscurity, having competed only in Japan for almost two years. Runner-up Farah said "I didn't have a clue about the guy. I hadn't seen him, so I didn't know what he could do or what he was capable of." Ibrahim was Ethiopia's only athlete to finish in the top two of an event at that year's championships. He closed the year with another 10,000 m gold medal at the 2011 All-Africa Games.

He could not build upon his form in 2012 as he was ruled out for the entire season and missed the 2012 Summer Olympics, where his rival Farah won a long-distance double. He returned to action at the Great Ireland Run, where he finished third.

Jeilan returned in time for the 2013 World Championships, this time winning the silver medal behind Farah.

In 2014, Jeilan took his first attempt at longer distances in a major race, running the Ras Al Khaimah Half Marathon in 1:01:47, to finish tenth overall.

== Personal bests ==
Event	Time (m:s)	Venue	Date
5000 m	13:03.22	Stockholm, Sweden	16 June 2016
10,000 m	26:58.75	Eugene	27 May 2016
10 km (road)	28:20	Cape Elizabeth, United States	1 August 2009
Half Marathon (road)	1:01:47	Ras Al Khaimah, United Arab Emirates	14 February 2014

- All information taken from IAAF profile.
