= Devis Favaro =

Italian hurdler (born 1972)

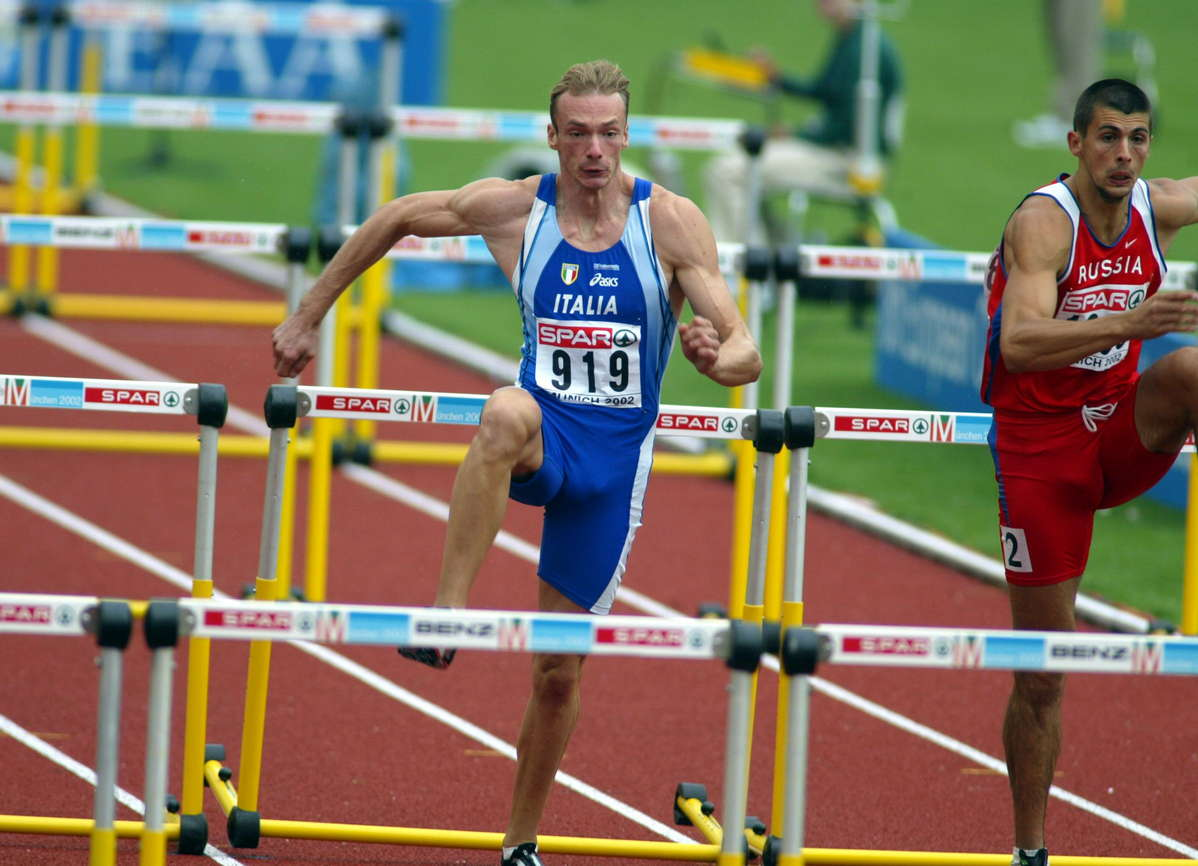
- Favaro at Munich 2002

Personal information
- Nationality: Italian
- Born: 14 July 1972 (age 54) Pordenone
- Height: 1.88 m (6 ft 2 in)
- Weight: 75 kg (165 lb)

Sport
- Country: Italy
- Sport: Athletics
- Event: 110 metres hurdles
- Club: G.S. Forestale

Achievements and titles
- Personal best: 110 m hs: 13.59 (2002)
Medal record
Mediterranean Games
Silver medal – second place	2001 Tunis	110 m hs
World Military Championships
Silver medal – second place	2002 Tivoli	110 m hs

Devis Favaro (born 1 June 1972) is a former Italian hurdler.

== Biography ==
He was finalist at the 2002 European Athletics Championships held in Munich, his personal best 13:59, set that final, is the 10th best Italian performance of all-time at the end of 2020 season. He was also silver medal at the 2001 Mediterranean Games held in Tunis and at the 2002 World Military Track and Field Championships held in Tivoli.

== Achievements ==
Year	Competition	Venue	Position	Event	Time	Notes
2002	European Championships	(Germany) Munich	6th	110 metres hurdles	13.59	PB

== See also ==
- Italian all-time lists - 110 metres hurdles
