= 2002 European Athletics Championships – Men's 110 metres hurdles =

Men's 110 metres hurdles at the European Athletics Championships

The men's 110 metres hurdles at the 2002 European Athletics Championships were held at the Olympic Stadium on August 9–10.

== Medalists ==
Gold	Silver	Bronze
Colin Jackson; Great Britain	Staņislavs Olijars; Latvia	Artur Kohutek; Poland

== Results ==
=== Heats ===
Qualification: First 2 of each heat (Q) and the next 6 fastest (q) qualified for the semifinals.

Wind:
Heat 1: -0.9 m/s, Heat 2: +0.5 m/s, Heat 3: +2.0 m/s, Heat 4: -0.1 m/s, Heat 5: 0.0 m/s

Rank	Heat	Name	Nationality	Time	Notes
1	1	Colin Jackson	Great Britain	13.41	Q
2	2	Artur Kohutek	Poland	13.49	Q
3	4	Staņislavs Olijars	Latvia	13.50	Q
4	5	Zhivko Videnov	Bulgaria	13.52	Q
5	1	Florian Schwarthoff	Germany	13.53	Q
5	5	Elmar Lichtenegger	Austria	13.53	Q
7	3	Andrea Giaconi	Italy	13.55	Q
8	2	Mike Fenner	Germany	13.57	Q
9	3	Cédric Lavanne	France	13.58	Q
10	4	Tony Jarrett	Great Britain	13.63	Q
11	5	Devis Favaro	Italy	13.65	q
12	5	Robert Kronberg	Sweden	13.66	q
13	3	Ivan Bitzi	Switzerland	13.72	q
14	5	Andrey Kislykh	Russia	13.76	q
15	3	Gregory Sedoc	Netherlands	13.82	q
16	1	Emiliano Pizzoli	Italy	13.83	q
17	1	Felipe Vivancos	Spain	13.84	
18	3	Leonard Hudec	Austria	13.85	
19	1	Jonathan Nsenga	Belgium	13.88	
19	4	Levente Csillag	Hungary	13.88	
21	2	Matti Niemi	Finland	13.89	
22	2	Damien Greaves	Great Britain	13.90	
22	4	Marko Ritola	Finland	13.90	
24	2	Dimitris Pietris	Greece	13.92	
25	3	Jan Schindzielorz	Germany	13.93	
26	4	Peter Coghlan	Ireland	13.96	
27	1	Zoran Miljuš	Croatia	13.99	
28	2	Jurica Grabušić	Croatia	14.04	
28	5	Ladislav Burdel	Czech Republic	14.04	
30	1	Luís Sá	Portugal	14.16	
31	4	Nenad Lončar	Yugoslavia	14.19	
32	3	Elton Bitincka	Albania	14.95	NR
	2	David Ilariani	Georgia	DNF	

=== Semifinals ===
Qualification: First 4 of each semifinal (Q) qualified directly for the final.

Wind:
Heat 1: -0.5 m/s, Heat 2: +0.8 m/s

Rank	Heat	Name	Nationality	Time	Notes
1	2	Colin Jackson	Great Britain	13.21	Q
2	1	Staņislavs Olijars	Latvia	13.34	Q
3	1	Artur Kohutek	Poland	13.44	Q, SB
3	2	Mike Fenner	Germany	13.44	Q
5	2	Zhivko Videnov	Bulgaria	13.45	Q
6	1	Florian Schwarthoff	Germany	13.52	Q
7	2	Robert Kronberg	Sweden	13.53	Q
8	2	Emiliano Pizzoli	Italy	13.59	SB
9	1	Devis Favaro	Italy	13.66	Q
10	2	Cédric Lavanne	France	13.68	
11	1	Elmar Lichtenegger	Austria	13.70	
12	2	Ivan Bitzi	Switzerland	13.76	
13	2	Andrea Giaconi	Italy	13.81	
14	1	Andrey Kislykh	Russia	13.89	
	1	Tony Jarrett	Great Britain	DQ	
	1	Gregory Sedoc	Netherlands	DNF	

=== Final ===
Wind: +0.4 m/s

Rank	Name	Nationality	Time	Notes
1st place, gold medalist(s)	Colin Jackson	Great Britain	13.11	SB
2nd place, silver medalist(s)	Staņislavs Olijars	Latvia	13.22	
3rd place, bronze medalist(s)	Artur Kohutek	Poland	13.32	SB
4	Florian Schwarthoff	Germany	13.37	SB
5	Mike Fenner	Germany	13.39	
6	Devis Favaro	Italy	13.59	PB
7	Robert Kronberg	Sweden	13.63	
8	Zhivko Videnov	Bulgaria	13.67	
