= 2008 African Championships in Athletics – Men's 10,000 metres =

The men's 10,000 metres event at the 2008 African Championships in Athletics was held at the Addis Ababa Stadium on April 30.

== Results ==
Rank	Name	Nationality	Time	Notes
1st place, gold medalist(s)	Gebregziabher Gebremariam	Ethiopia	28:17.11	
2nd place, silver medalist(s)	Ibrahim Jeilan	Ethiopia	28:30.66	
3rd place, bronze medalist(s)	Eshetu Wondimu	Ethiopia	28:56.36	
4	John Cheruiyot Korir	Kenya	29:07.33	
5	Bernard Cheruiyot Sang	Kenya	29:47.61	
6	Julius Kiptoo	Kenya	30:12.10	
7	Etienne Bizimana	Burundi	30:21.92	
8	Cyriaqu Ndayikengurukiye	Rwanda	31:46.14	
9	Adilson Spencer	Cape Verde	34:09.62	
10	Ibrahim Ismael Hassan	Djibouti	35:29.00	
	Siyabonga Nkonde	South Africa	DNF	
	Richard Bwalya	Zambia	DNS	
	Samwel Kwang	Tanzania	DNS	
	Ezekiel Jafari	Tanzania	DNS	
	Youssouf Houssein Nour	Djibouti	DNS	
	Cuthbert Nyasango	Zimbabwe	DNS	
