= 2002 African Championships in Athletics – Men's 10,000 metres =

The men's 10,000 metres event at the 2002 African Championships in Athletics was held in Radès, Tunisia on August 7.

== Results ==
Rank	Name	Nationality	Time	Notes
1st place, gold medalist(s)	Paul Malakwen Kosgei	Kenya	28:44.81	
2nd place, silver medalist(s)	John Cheruiyot Korir	Kenya	28:45.23	
3rd place, bronze medalist(s)	Benjamin Maiyo	Kenya	28:45.24	
4	Abderrahim Goumri	Morocco	28:45.92	
5	Dejene Berhanu	Ethiopia	28:46.21	
6	Zersenay Tadese	Eritrea	28:47.29	
7	Saïd Berioui	Morocco	28:53.32	
8	Jaouad Gharib	Morocco	28:57.12	
9	Dereje Adere	Ethiopia	29:43.13	
10	Rachid Safari	Rwanda	29:43.57	
11	Eshetu Gezhagne	Ethiopia	29:55.96	
12	Samson Kiflemariam	Eritrea	30:07.55	
13	Tekle Mengisteab	Eritrea	30:08.99	
14	Adel Dahry	Libya	30:19.48	
15	Fahran Ali	Somalia	33:12.57	
16	Doualeh Yacin Abdillahi	Djibouti	33:16.10	
17	Said Dahir Abdi	Somalia	33:47.59	
	Mahamoud Houssein Ismael	Djibouti	DNF	
	Tau Khotso	Lesotho	DNS	
