= 2002 African Military Games =

- Host city: Nairobi
- Country: Kenya
- Motto: "Friendship Through Sports"
- Nations: 32
- Athletes: 1562
- Events: 11 sports
- Opening: 17 April 2002
- Closing: 27 April 2002
- Opened by: President Daniel arap Moi
- Main venue: Moi International Sports Centre

The 2002 African Military Games (French: Jeux Africains Militaires) is the first edition of the African Military Games, it was a multi-sport event for military athletes in Africa. The one-off event was held under the auspices of the International Military Sports Council (CISM) and, its sister group, the Organization of Military Sport in Africa (OSMA). The games was hosted by Kenya in and around Nairobi between 17 and 27 April 2002.

== Preparation ==
The agreement to create the games came from Hamad Kalkaba Malboum, a Cameroonian and a future president of the CISM. In 2000 the African delegates of the CISM meeting in Johannesburg accepted the Nairobi host bid following the presentation by Kenyan military personnel Jack Tuwei and Frank Mulu. A total of 1562 athletes were sent to compete in the competition's 11-sport programme.

== Games ==
The opening ceremony was undertaken at the Moi International Sports Centre in Kasarani and then-President Daniel arap Moi was present to inaugurate the proceedings. The official motto of the event was "Friendship Through Sports". It was the first time that a continental games for military sport had ever been held. Athletes were housed at Kenyatta University during the course of the games. A total of 32 countries sent teams to the event; Côte d'Ivoire and Guinea-Bissau were also present in an observer capacity.

Seven nations entered the association football competition, which was won by Eritrea and hosted at the Moi International Sports Centre and Nairobi City Stadium. In the athletics competition, Kenyan athletes were the foremost competitors, including Wilson Boit Kipketer (1997 steeplechase world champion) and Noah Ngeny (2000 Olympic champion in the 1500 m).

The Kenyan authorities enforced a no-smoking policy for the games to promote a smoke-free sporting environment – a move which was praised by the World Health Organization.

== Legacy ==
The continental games was not held again after 2002, but it was superseded by the East African Community Military Games – a smaller regional event for military sports, which was launched in 2005.

A further edition of the African Military Games was scheduled for 2007, then 2009 in Abuja, Nigeria, but did not come to pass. Renewed attempts to seek sponsors and hold the games in Nigeria were made in 2010. Nigerian president Goodluck Jonathan approved a schedule for the games to be held in 2012, but again this did not happen, with a background of the ongoing Islamist insurgency in Nigeria.

== Sports ==
- Athletics
- Basketball
- Boxing
- Field hockey
- Football
- Golf
- Handball
- Judo
- Swimming
- Taekwondo
- Volleyball

== Participating nations ==
A total of thirty-two countries sent athlete delegations to the event and a further two nations sent observers. The host nation Kenya sent the largest delegation with 287 athletes. Nigeria was the next largest group with 270, followed by South Africa (155). Cameroon and Guinea also sent over hundred athletes each.

* = Host nation

- Algeria
- Angola
- Benin
- Botswana
- Burkina Faso
- Burundi
- Cameroon (131)
- Congo
- Djibouti
- DR Congo
- Equatorial Guinea
- Eritrea
- Ethiopia
- Gabon
- Guinea (103)
- Kenya* (287)
- Lesotho
- Libya
- Mali
- Morocco
- Namibia
- Niger
- Nigeria (270)
- Rwanda
- Senegal
- South Africa (155)
- Sudan
- Swaziland
- Tanzania
- Tunisia
- Uganda
- Zambia

Observer nations

- Ivory Coast
- Guinea-Bissau

== See also ==
- 2002 World Military Track and Field Championships
