= Rudieon Sylvan =

Grenadian track and field athlete (born 1979)

Personal information
- Full name: Rudieon Sylvan
- Nationality: Grenada
- Born: 17 January 1979 (age 47) St. George's, Grenada

Sport
- Sport: Athletics
- Event: Sprint

Rudieon Sylvan (born 17 January 1979) is a Grenadian track and field athlete who competed in the men's 400m at the 2000 Summer Olympics. He ran a 48.17, good for 7th in his heat. His best-ever time was a 46.62 finish in 1999.
