= Artur Kohutek =

Polish hurdler (born 1971)

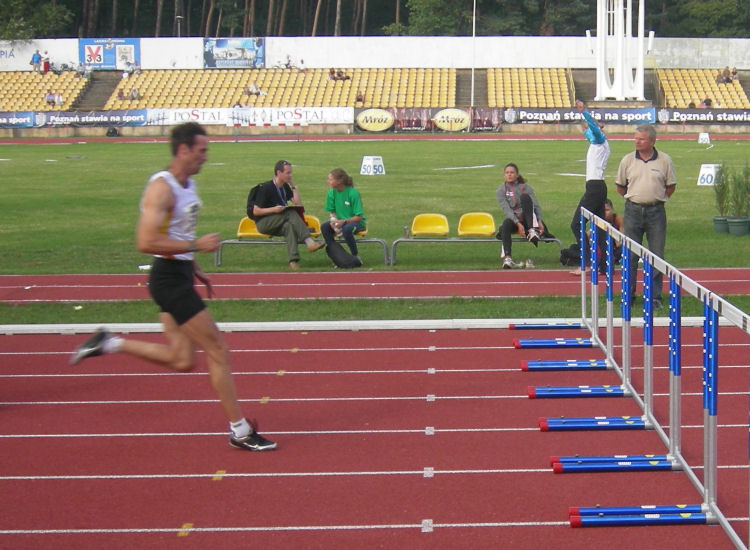
- Artur Kohutek in 2007

Medal record

Representing Poland

Men's athletics

European Championships
Bronze medal – third place	2002 Munich	110 m hurdles

Artur Kohutek (born 1 May 1971 in Osiek) is a Polish hurdler and soldier of the Polish Army.

He won the bronze medal at the 2002 European Championships in Munich in a time of 13.32 seconds.

His personal best time is 13.27 seconds, achieved in the quarter final heat at the 1997 World Championships in Athletics in Athens. This is the current Polish record. In addition he was able to equal the time one year later in Leverkusen.

== Competition record ==
Year	Competition	Venue	Position	Event	Notes
Representing Poland
1990	World Junior Championships	Plovdiv, Bulgaria	11th (sf)	110m hurdles	14.36 w (wind: +3.1 m/s)
1995	World Indoor Championships	Barcelona, Spain	20th (h)	60 m hurdles	7.84
1996	European Indoor Championships	Stockholm, Sweden	11th (sf)	60 m hurdles	8.24
1997	World Championships	Athens, Greece	7th (sf)	110 m hurdles	13.39
1998	European Championships	Budapest, Hungary	5th	110 m hurdles	13.29
2001	World Championships	Edmonton, Canada	16th (sf)	110 m hurdles	13.60
2002	European Championships	Munich, Germany	3rd	110 m hurdles	13.32

== See also ==
- Polish records in athletics
