= Jerome Young =

Jamaican-American sprinter (born 1976)

Personal information
- Born: August 14, 1976 (age 49)
- Height: 5 ft 11 in (180 cm)
- Weight: 175 lb (79 kg)

Sport
- Country: United States
- Sport: Athletics
- Event: 400-meter dash

Achievements and titles
- Personal best: 400 m: 44.09 (1998)
Medal record
Men's athletics
World Championships
Disqualified	1997 Athens	4 × 400 m relay
Disqualified	2001 Edmonton	4 × 400 m relay

Jerome Young (born August 14, 1976) is an American former track and field sprinter who specialized in the 400-meter dash. He won gold medals with the United States 4 × 400-meter relay team at the 2001 World Championships in Athletics and 1997 World Championships in Athletics, but was later stripped of these medals due to doping and was ultimately banned from the sport. He also was the heats runner for the relay team at the 2000 Summer Olympics, where the Americans won gold, but this medal was rescinded as well.

== Background ==
Born in Clarendon, Jamaica, he attended A.I. Prince Technical High School in Hartford, Connecticut. In 1995, as a senior in high school, Jerome set a Connecticut state record of 45.01 in the 400 m. He was Track and Field News "High School Athlete of the Year" in 1995.

Jerome was part of the world record breaking 4 × 400 m relay team in 1998 along with Michael Johnson, Antonio Pettigrew, and Tyree Washington.

On June 29, 2004 the IAAF announced that Young committed a doping offense on 26 June 1999.

The effect of the decision was to negate all his results from 26 June 1999 to 25 June 2001, and to ban him permanently from the date of the decision. Accordingly, he and his teammates were stripped of their 2000 Olympic medal in the 4 × 400 m relay.

The Court of Arbitration for Sport reinstated the 2000 Olympic gold for Jerome's relay teammates in 2005. Jerome had not run in the final; he had only run in one of the qualifying heats.

Young and the U.S. team had previously been stripped of the 2003 world championship relay gold due to a doping admission by teammate Calvin Harrison.

On August 2, 2008, the International Olympic Committee stripped the gold medal from the U.S. men's 4 × 400-meter relay team, due to a doping admission by teammate Antonio Pettigrew.

Jerome Young resides in Raleigh, NC as a sprinting coach at Millbrook High School. Jerome also teaches special education at high school.

== International competitions ==
These were later stripped due to Young's drug use during his career.

- 1997
  - World Championships – Athens, Greece.
    - 4 × 400 m. relay gold medal
- 1998
  - IAAF World Cup – Johannesburg, South Africa.
    - 400 m. silver medal
- 2001
  - World Championships – Edmonton, Alberta, Canada.
    - 4 × 400 m. gold medal
  - World Indoor Championships – Lisbon, Portugal.
    - 4 × 400 m. silver medal

== See also ==
- Doping at the Olympic Games
- Doping at the World Championships in Athletics
- List of doping cases in sport
- List of stripped Olympic medals
- List of World Championships in Athletics medalists (men)
- Men's 4 × 400 metres relay world record progression
- United States at the World Athletics Championships

Awards
Preceded by Andre Scott	Track & Field News High School Boys Athlete of the Year; 1995	Succeeded by Obea Moore
