= Michael Johnson (sprinter) =

American sprinter (born 1967)

- Johnson in 2026

Personal information
- Full name: Michael Duane Johnson
- Born: September 13, 1967 (age 59) Dallas, Texas, U.S.
- Height: 6 ft 1 in (185 cm)
- Weight: 175 lb (79 kg)

Sport
- Sport: Track and field
- Event: Sprints
- College team: Baylor

Achievements and titles
- Personal bests: 100 m: 10.09 (Knoxville 1994); 200 m: 19.32 (Atlanta 1996); 300 m: 30.85 NB (Pretoria 2000); 400 m: 43.18 AR NR (Sevilla 1999)
Medal record
Men's athletics
Representing United States
International athletics competitions
| Event | 1st | 2nd | 3rd |
|---|---|---|---|
| Olympic Games | 4 | 0 | 0 |
| World Championships | 8 | 0 | 0 |
| Goodwill Games | 4 | 0 | 0 |
| Summer Universiade | 0 | 1 | 0 |
| Total | 16 | 1 | 0 |
Olympic Games
| Gold medal – first place | 1992 Barcelona | 4 × 400 m relay |
| Gold medal – first place | 1996 Atlanta | 200 m |
| Gold medal – first place | 1996 Atlanta | 400 m |
| Gold medal – first place | 2000 Sydney | 400 m |
| Disqualified | 2000 Sydney | 4 × 400 m relay |
World Championships
| Gold medal – first place | 1991 Tokyo | 200 m |
| Gold medal – first place | 1993 Stuttgart | 400 m |
| Gold medal – first place | 1993 Stuttgart | 4 × 400 m relay |
| Gold medal – first place | 1995 Göteborg | 200 m |
| Gold medal – first place | 1995 Göteborg | 400 m |
| Gold medal – first place | 1995 Göteborg | 4 × 400 m relay |
| Gold medal – first place | 1997 Athens | 400 m |
| Gold medal – first place | 1999 Seville | 400 m |
Goodwill Games
| Gold medal – first place | 1990 Seattle | 200 m |
| Gold medal – first place | 1994 Saint Petersburg | 200 m |
| Gold medal – first place | 1994 Saint Petersburg | 4 × 400 m relay |
| Gold medal – first place | 1998 New York | 400 m |
Summer Universiade
| Silver medal – second place | 1989 Duisburg | 4 x 400 m relay |

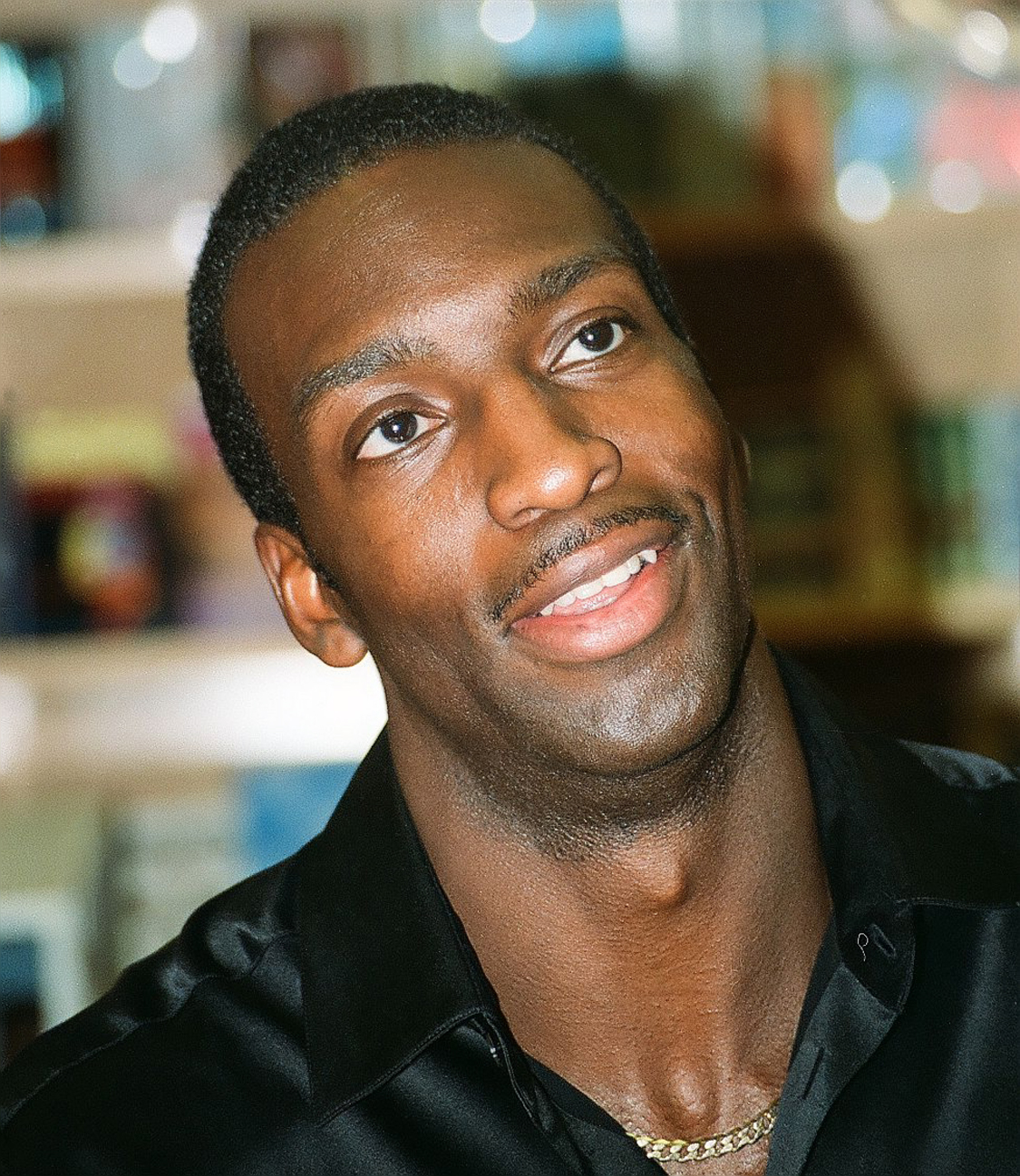
Johnson (1995)

Michael Duane Johnson (born September 13, 1967) is an American sprinter who became Olympic Champion four times, and World Champion eight times in the span of his career. His 400 m time of 43.18 seconds is the American record and is the second fastest time ever. He held the world and Olympic records in the 200 m and 400 m, as well as the world record in the indoor 400 m. He also once held the world's best time in the 300 m. Johnson is generally considered one of the greatest and most consistent sprinters in the history of track and field.

Johnson is the only male athlete to win both the 200 meters and 400 meters events at the same Olympics, a feat he accomplished at the 1996 Summer Olympics in Atlanta. Johnson is also the only man to successfully defend his Olympic title in the 400 m, having done so at the 2000 Summer Olympics in Sydney. Aside from his Olympic success, Johnson accumulated eight gold medals at the World Championships and is tied with Carl Lewis for the fourth most gold medals won by a runner.

Johnson's distinctive stiff upright running position and very short steps defied the conventional wisdom that a high knee lift was necessary for maximum speed. As of July 2024, Johnson holds three of the top 100 times for the 200 meters (having broken 20 seconds 23 times) and 22 of the top 100 times for the 400 meters. Of those, he holds nine of the top 25 times for the 400 meters. He broke 44 seconds for the 400 meters 22 times, more than twice as many times as any other athlete.

Johnson held the US national records for the 200, 300, and 400 meters. The 4 × 400 meters relay world record was anchored by Johnson.

Since 2001, Johnson has worked for the BBC, appearing as a pundit at multiple events. He has been a part of the BBC's Olympics athletics coverage since Athens 2004.

== Career ==
=== 1991–1995 ===
In 1991 at the World Championships in Tokyo, Johnson earned his first world title by winning the 200 m race by the unusual margin of victory of 0.33 seconds over Frankie Fredericks.

Two weeks before the 1992 Summer Olympics began, Johnson and his agent both contracted food poisoning at a restaurant in Spain. Johnson lost both weight and strength. He was the favorite to win the 200 m going into the Olympics, but he could do no better than sixth in his semifinal heat, and failed to reach the 200 m final by 0.16 seconds. Nevertheless, he was able to race as a member of the 4 × 400 m relay team, which won a gold medal and set a new world-record time of 2:55.74. Johnson ran his leg in a time of 44.73.

He won the 1993 U.S. title in the 400 m, and followed it with world titles in both the 400 m and 4 × 400 m relay. His 42.94 second split time in the 4 × 400 m relay remains the fastest 400 meters in history. At the 1995 World Championships in Gothenburg, Johnson won his first 200 m and 400 m "double". No elite-level male track athlete had accomplished this in a major meet in the 20th century. At the end he made it a "triple" by adding another title in the 4 × 400 m relay.

=== 1996 Atlanta Olympics ===
In June 1996, Johnson was 28 when he ran the 200-m in 19.66 seconds at the U.S. Olympic Trials, breaking Pietro Mennea's record of 19.72 seconds that had stood for nearly 17 years. With that performance he qualified to run at the 1996 Summer Olympics in Atlanta and prepared to attempt to win both the 200 meters and 400 meters events, a feat never before achieved by a male athlete. (Two women have won Olympic gold medals in both races in the same year: Valerie Brisco-Hooks in the 1984 Summer Olympics in Los Angeles, and Marie-José Pérec, in the 1996 Olympics in Atlanta.)

Johnson entered the Olympic finals donning a custom-designed pair of golden-colored Nike racing spikes made with Zytel, causing him to be nicknamed "The Man With the Golden Shoes". Sources differ on the exact weight of these shoes; the manufacturer of the spikes claims they weighed 3 ounces (85 g) each, while other sources state each shoe weighed about 94 grams (3.3 oz). The left shoe was a US size 10.5 while the right shoe was a US size 11, to account for Johnson's longer right foot.

On July 29, Johnson easily captured the 400 m Olympic title with an Olympic record time of 43.49 seconds, 0.92 seconds ahead of silver medalist Roger Black of Great Britain. At the 200 m final on August 1, Johnson ran the opening 100 meters in 10.12 seconds and finished the race in a world-record time of 19.32 seconds, breaking by more than three tenths of a second the previous record he had set in the U.S. Olympic Trials, on the same track one month earlier—the largest improvement ever on a 200 m world record. Some commentators compared the performance to Bob Beamon's record-shattering long jump at the 1968 Summer Olympics in Mexico City. During the race, Johnson strained a muscle in his leg, which prevented him from winning his third gold medal of the Olympics in the 4 × 400 m relay as Team USA went on to win the gold even without him.

After the 1996 season ended, Johnson received the James E. Sullivan Award as the top amateur athlete in any sport in the United States, and was named ABC's Wide World of Sports Athlete of the Year. In August, HarperCollins published his biographical/motivational book, Slaying the Dragon: How to Turn Your Small Steps to Great Feats.

=== Rivalry with Donovan Bailey ===
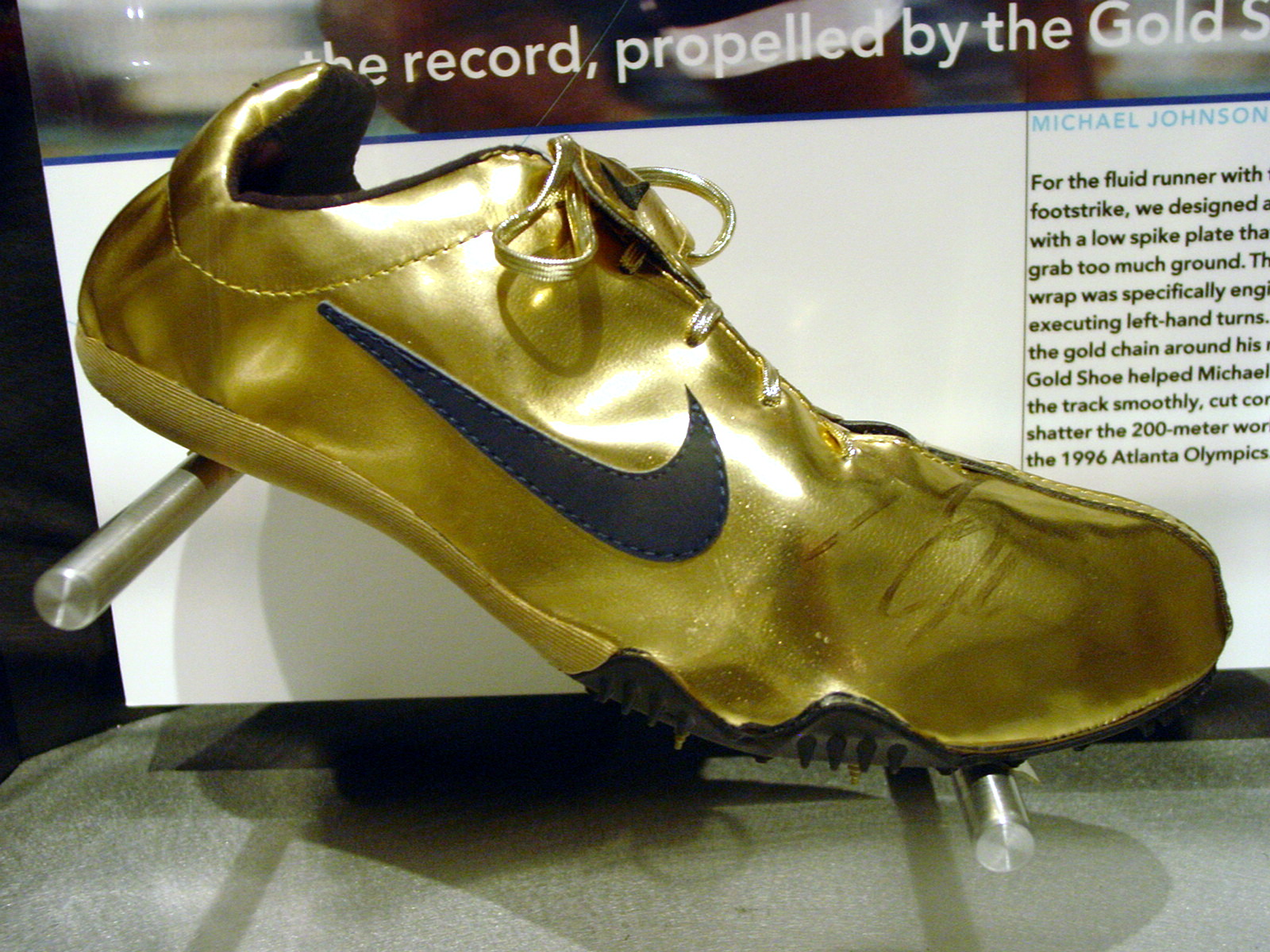
Johnson's gold spikes

After the end of the 1996 Summer Olympics, American Sportscaster Bob Costas claimed that Johnson was faster than 100 m gold medalist Donovan Bailey because Johnson's 200 m time (19.32 Seconds) divided by 2 (9.66 Seconds) was shorter than Bailey's 100 m time (9.84). This started a debate on whether Johnson or Bailey was the real "World's Fastest Man", which in turn resulted in a 150 m race between the two, in which Bailey won after Johnson, already behind in the race, alleged to have injured his hamstring.

=== 1997–1999 ===
After recovering from the injury, Johnson was able to compete for his third 400 m world title. The IAAF invented a new policy of giving a "bye" to the defending champions essentially to allow Johnson to compete in the IAAF World Championships that year, because Johnson was unable to qualify the conventional method (by competing in the USA Outdoor Track and Field Championships) due to his injury from the race with Bailey. More than a month after the U.S. Championships, Johnson had recovered from his injury and won the 400 meters at the 1997 World Championships in Athens.

At the 1998 Goodwill Games in New York City, Johnson anchored the U.S. 4 × 400 m relay team with Jerome Young, Antonio Pettigrew, and Tyree Washington to a win and set a world record of 2:54.20. Pettigrew has since admitted doping from 1997, while Young was caught doping in 1999. The world record was annulled by the IAAF in August 2008, and reverted to the time of 2:54:29 Johnson helped set in the 1993 World Championships.

Johnson was plagued by injury in 1999, and his following season was troubled with two injury scares that limited him to just four 400 m races before the 1999 World Championships in Seville. Were it not for the IAAF policy established two years earlier for Johnson, that allowed automatic entry to defending champions, he could not have raced in Seville since he failed to compete in the U.S. trials due to his injury. He recovered and won his fourth 400 meter world title with a new world-record time of 43.18 seconds at the relatively late age of 31 years and 11 months, which stood for 12 days short of 17 years before being beaten at the 2016 Olympics by the South African Wayde van Niekerk. Johnson's splits for this world record were 21.22 seconds for the opening 200 meters and 21.96 seconds for the closing 200 meters, giving a differential of 0.74 seconds.

=== 2000 Sydney Olympics ===
After qualifying for the 2000 Summer Olympics in the 400 m, Johnson sustained an injury in the 2000 U.S. Olympic Trials for the 200 meters while racing in a highly anticipated matchup against the 100 m and 200 m world champion, Maurice Greene. The injury prevented a defense of his 200 m Olympic title. Johnson ended his career at the Sydney Olympics by winning the gold medal in the 400 m, which brought his total number of Olympic gold medals to four. By winning the 400 m at the age of 33 years 12 days, he earned the distinction of being the oldest Olympic gold medalist at any track event shorter than 5000 m. Johnson was also the anchor of the United States 4 × 400 relay team along with Alvin Harrison, Antonio Pettigrew, and Calvin Harrison, which originally won the gold medal, but was later stripped of the title after Pettigrew and Jerome Young (who ran in the heats) were found guilty of having used performance-enhancing drugs.

On July 18, 2004, the International Association of Athletics Federations (IAAF) ruled that Jerome Young was ineligible to compete in Sydney and annulled all his past results, including those achieved as part of relay teams. Young had competed for the USA team in the heats and semi-final of this event. Therefore, the United States team was stripped of the gold medal and Nigeria, Jamaica, and the Bahamas were moved up one position each. On July 22, 2005, the Court of Arbitration for Sport (CAS) overturned this decision and restored the original finish order of the race based on a ruling that a team should not be disqualified because of a doping offense by an athlete who did not compete in the finals. Then in June 2008, Antonio Pettigrew admitted to having used banned performance-enhancing substances, and agreed to return his gold medal. Johnson announced that he would return his own gold medal, won as part of the relay team with Pettigrew. Johnson stated that he felt "cheated, betrayed and let down" by what Pettigrew had done at the Games. Pettigrew died by suicide in 2010.

== Achievements ==
Johnson has run 200 m in under 19.80 seconds six times, and he has run the distance in less than 20 seconds twenty-three times. He holds nine of the top 50 200 m performances of all time. Johnson has run twenty-two 400 m races in under 44 seconds; he holds twenty-two of the top 50 and four of the top ten 400 m performances of all time. Over the course of his career, he twice set the world record in the 200 m, three times set the world record as part of the 4 × 400 m relay team, twice set the indoor 400 m world record, set the outdoor 400 m world record once, and set the 300 m mark once.

=== Season's bests ===
| Year | 100 meters | 200 meters | 400 meters |
|---|---|---|---|
| 1986 | — | 21.30 | — |
| 1987 | — | 20.41 | 46.29 |
| 1988 | — | 20.07 | 45.23 |
| 1989 | 10.29 | 20.05 | 46.49 |
| 1990 | — | 19.85 | 44.21 |
| 1991 | 10.23 | 19.88 | 43.89 |
| 1992 | — | 19.79 | 43.98 |
| 1993 | 10.12 | 20.06 | 43.65 |
| 1994 | 10.09 | 19.94 | 43.90 |
| 1995 | — | 19.79 | 43.39 |
| 1996 | 10.12+ | 19.32 | 43.44 |
| 1997 | — | 20.05 | 43.75 |
| 1998 | — | 20.31 | 43.68 |
| 1999 | — | 19.93 | 43.18 |
| 2000 | — | 19.71 | 43.68 |

== After retirement ==
Johnson was elected to the United States Track and Field Hall of Fame in 2004, where his 200 m performance at the 1996 Olympics was named the greatest track and field moment of the last 25 years.

In 2007 Johnson opened Michael Johnson Performance, at McKinney, Texas, a training facility for youth athletes aged 9 to 18 and professional athletes in all sports. The company works with Olympic teams and football clubs and has operations around the world. Michael Johnson Performance currently works with Arsenal, assisting in the development of young players in their academy.

In June 2008, Johnson voluntarily returned the 4 × 400 m relay gold medal he earned in the 2000 Olympics after Antonio Pettigrew, who ran the second leg, admitted he took performance-enhancing drugs between 1997 and 2001. Pettigrew made his admission while giving testimony in the trial of coach Trevor Graham for his role in the BALCO scandal. On August 2, 2008, the International Olympic Committee stripped the gold medal from the U.S. men's 4 × 400-meter relay team. Three of the four runners in the event final, including Pettigrew and twins Alvin and Calvin Harrison, and preliminary round runner Jerome Young, all have admitted or tested positive for performance-enhancing drugs. Only Johnson and Angelo Taylor, who also ran in preliminary rounds, were not implicated. Johnson had already returned his medal because, as he said, he felt the medal was not won fairly.

Johnson was one of the Olympic torch bearers in the relay in the run up to the London 2012 Olympics, carrying it to Stonehenge and Salisbury Cathedral in Wiltshire.

In the summer of 2018, Johnson was co-captain and a coach for Godspeed, a flag football team made of former professional American football players that participated in the American Flag Football League (AFFL). The team were crowned the champions of participating pro teams but lost in the final match to the amateur champion team.

In September 2018, Johnson suffered a stroke that affected his left side. By November, he stated he was almost "back to normal", and attributed his successful recovery to the "Olympic mindset". In connection with his 54th birthday in 2021, he states that he has fully recovered.

In 2024, he launched a new Track and Field League, Grand Slam Track, ahead of the 2025 season start. In December 2025, Grand Slam Track confirmed they had filed for bankruptcy. Grand Slam Track has expressed its intention to return for a 2026 season once its financial obligations are resolved.

=== Broadcasting ===
Since retiring from competitive track in 2001, Johnson has worked as a television pundit, often for the BBC in the United Kingdom, where he has also written columns for the Daily Telegraph and The Times newspapers.

Johnson first worked for the BBC at the World Championships in 2001. He subsequently was part of the BBC's presenting team at the 2004 Olympic Games in Athens, 2008 Olympic Games in Beijing, 2012 Olympic Games in London, 2016 Olympic Games in Rio de Janeiro, 2020 Olympic Games in Tokyo, and 2024 Olympic Games in Paris. In addition, he has worked on the 2002 Commonwealth Games in Manchester, 2006 Commonwealth Games in Melbourne, 2010 Commonwealth Games in Delhi, 2014 Commonwealth Games in Glasgow, 2018 Commonwealth Games in Gold Coast and 2022 Commonwealth Games in Birmingham. Johnson has also worked for the BBC at the World Championships, but did not take part in the 2025 World Athletics Championships after deciding to focus on Grand Slam Track.

He was in the BBC commentary booth for the men's 400 meters final in Rio de Janeiro to see his world record broken by Wayde van Niekerk, saying about van Niekerk's performance, "Oh my God! From lane eight, a world record. He took it out so quick. I have never seen anything from 200 to 400 like that. That was a massacre from Wayde van Niekerk. He just put those guys away."

=== Appearances in media ===
Johnson guest-starred in the 2002 film, The Master of Disguise, as one of the disguises Fabbrizio (James Brolin) takes on to borrow the U.S. Constitution, as part of a scheme by Devlin Bowman (Brent Spiner) to steal the world's greatest treasures. I

Johnson appeared as a contestant on NBC's 9th season of The Celebrity Apprentice (2010), placing 10th after exiting the show due to a personal issue on the fifth episode of the season first airing April 11, 2010.

As part of the build-up to the 2012 Summer Olympics, Johnson made a documentary, Survival of the Fastest, for Channel 4 which investigated the dominance of African-American and African-Caribbean sprinters. The program made the suggestion that a side effect of the slave trade may have been to accelerate natural selection as only the very fittest could survive the brutal process, resulting in a population predisposed to superior athletic performance.

== Personal life ==
As of 2008 Johnson lived in Marin County, California, with his second wife Armine Shamiryan (a chef), and his daughter Selendis Sebastian, born in 2000 during his first marriage to entertainment reporter Kerry D'Oyen.

== Awards ==
- Associated Press Athlete of the Year: 1996
- 3× USOC SportsMan of the Year: 1993, 1995, 1996
- James E. Sullivan Award: 1996
- L'Équipe Champion of Champions: 1996
- World Athletics Awards
  - 2× World Athlete of the Year (Men): 1996, 1999
- Track & Field News
  - 2× World Athlete of the Year: 1990, 1996
  - 6× U.S. Athlete of the Year: 1990, 1993, 1994, 1995, 1996, 2000

Records
| Preceded by Pietro Mennea | Men's 200 meters World Record Holder; June 23, 1996 – August 20, 2008 | Succeeded by Usain Bolt |
| Preceded by Butch Reynolds | Men's 400 meters World Record Holder; August 26, 1999 – August 14, 2016 | Succeeded by Wayde van Niekerk |
Awards
| Preceded by Roger Kingdom | Men's Track & Field Athlete of the Year; 1990 | Succeeded by Sergei Bubka |
| Preceded by Kevin Young | Men's Track & Field ESPY Award; 1994 | Succeeded by Dennis Mitchell |
| Preceded by Jonathan Edwards | IAAF World Athlete of the Year; 1996 | Succeeded by Wilson Kipketer |
| Preceded by Dennis Mitchell | Men's Track & Field ESPY Award; 1996–1997 | Succeeded by Wilson Kipketer |
| Preceded by Haile Gebrselassie | Men's Track & Field Athlete of the Year; 1996 | Succeeded by Wilson Kipketer |
| Preceded by Jonathan Edwards | L'Équipe Champion of Champions; 1996 | Succeeded by Sergei Bubka |
| Preceded by Jonah Lomu | BBC Overseas Sports Personality of the Year (with Evander Holyfield); 1996 | Succeeded by Martina Hingis |
| Preceded by Haile Gebrselassie | IAAF World Athlete of the Year; 1999 | Succeeded by Jan Železný |
| Preceded by Maurice Greene | Men's Track & Field ESPY Award; 2000 | Succeeded by Maurice Greene |
| Preceded by Simon Hughes | RTS Television Sport Awards; Best Sports Pundit; 2003 | Succeeded by John Francome |
| Preceded by Pablo Morales; Dan Jansen | USOC Sportsman of the Year; 1993; 1995, 1996 | Succeeded by Dan Jansen; Pete Sampras |
Achievements
| Preceded by Robson da Silva | Men's 200 m Best Year Performance; 1990–1991 | Succeeded by Michael Marsh |
| Preceded by Danny Everett | Men's 400 m Best Year Performance; 1991 | Succeeded by Quincy Watts |
| Preceded by Quincy Watts | Men's 400 m Best Year Performance; 1993–2000 | Succeeded by Tyree Washington |
| Preceded by John Regis | Men's 200 m Best Year Performance; 1995–1996 | Succeeded by Ato Boldon |
| Preceded by Francis Obikwelu | Men's 200 m Best Year Performance; 2000 | Succeeded by Joshua J. Johnson |
