= Tyree Washington =

American sprinter (born 1976)

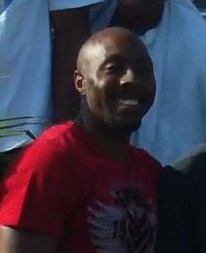
- Washington at the 2012 CCCAA State Championships

Personal information
- Born: August 28, 1976 (age 50) Riverside, California, U.S.
- Height: 6 ft 0 in (1.83 m)
- Weight: 180 lb (82 kg)

Sport
- Country: United States
- Sport: Men's athletics
- Event: Sprints
- Coached by: Blackman Ihem
Medal record
World Championships
Gold medal – first place	2003 Paris	400 m
Bronze medal – third place	1997 Athens	400 m
World Indoor Championships
Gold medal – first place	2003 Birmingham	400 m
Gold medal – first place	2003 Birmingham	4 × 400 m relay
Gold medal – first place	2006 Moscow	4 × 400 m relay
Goodwill Games
Silver medal – second place	1998 New York	200 m
Silver medal – second place	1998 New York	400 m
- Updated on April 30, 2012

Tyree Washington (born August 28, 1976) is a retired American sprinter.

Born in Riverside, California, Washington attended both La Sierra High School and San Bernardino Valley College.

His coach during 2003 was Antonio Pettigrew, who ran alongside Washington, Michael Johnson and Jerome Young in breaking the 4 × 400 metres world record in 1998 with a time of 2:54.20. However, both Young and Pettigrew were later found to have violated doping regulations during their careers, and the IAAF now list the 1993 US quartet of Andrew Valmon, Quincy Watts, Butch Reynolds and Michael Johnson as the world record holders.

At the 2003 World Championships, Washington originally finished first in the 4 × 400 metres relay with Young, Calvin Harrison and Derrick Brew; and second in the 400 m behind Young. Calvin Harrison was found guilty of a doping violation (modafinil) in June 2003, leading to the quartet being stripped of the 4 × 400 m medals. Young was given a lifetime ban for a second offence in 2004; this was applied retrospectively to 1999 (Young's first failed test) in 2008, leading to Washington being awarded the gold medal.

His last major win was at the 2006 world indoor championships. He retired in 2008 after failing to qualify at the US Olympic trials.

== Achievements ==
=== Personal bests ===
Event	Time (seconds)	Venue	Date
100 meters	10.41	Azusa, California, United States	April 9, 2005
200 meters	20.09	Edwardsville, Illinois, United States	May 22, 1999
400 meters	44.28	Los Angeles, California, United States	May 12, 2001

- All information from IAAF Profile

=== Competition record ===
  - 1997 Junior College State Champion 400 meters (Fresno, Ca); Junior College State Champion 400 meters (Fresno, Ca); Junior College State Record Holder 200 meters; Junior College State Record Holder 400 meters; Junior College National Record Holder 400 meters (Bakersfield, Ca).
  - World Championships – Athens, Greece.
    - 400 m bronze medal
    - 4 × 400 m relay gold medal
  - 1998 Goodwill Games Silver medalist 400 meters (New York); Goodwill Games Silver medalist 200 meters (New York)
- 2003
  - World Championships – Paris, France.
    - 400 m gold medal (originally silver before the disqualification of his best friend Young for a doping violation)
    - 4 × 400 m relay disqualified due to a doping of one of his teammates (originally gold medal)
  - IAAF World Indoor Championships – Birmingham, England.
    - 400 m gold medal
    - 4 × 400 m relay gold medal
  - 2005 World Athletic Final 400 meter Champion (Monte Carlo)
- 2006
  - IAAF World Indoor Championships – Moscow, Russia.
    - 4 × 400 m relay gold medal

He ran the fastest time in 2001 (44.28 seconds) and again in 2003 (44.33 seconds).
