= 2024 African Military Games =

- Host city: Abuja
- Country: Nigeria
- Nations: 25
- Athletes: 1625
- Events: 20 sports
- Opening: 18 November
- Closing: 30 November
- Opened by: Kashim Shettima
- Main venue: Moshood Abiola National Stadium

The 2024 African Military Games was the second edition of the African Military Games, it was a multi-sport event for military athletes in Africa. The one-off event was held under the auspices of the International Military Sports Council (CISM) and its sister group, the Organization of Military Sport in Africa (OSMA). The games were hosted in Abuja, Nigeria between 18 and 30 November 2024.

== Sports ==
- Archery
- Athletics
- Badminton
- Basketball
- Boxing
- Cycling
- Fencing
- Field hockey
- Football
- Golf
- Handball
- Judo
- Karate
- Shooting
- Swimming
- Table tennis
- Taekwondo
- Tennis
- Volleyball
- Wrestling

== Participating nations ==
A total of twenty five countries sent athlete delegations to the event. The host nation Nigeria sent the largest delegation.

- Algeria (120)
- Burkina Faso
- Cameroon
- Cape Verde
- Congo
- DR Congo
- Congo
- Eritrea
- Ethiopia
- Ghana
- Guinea
- Ivory Coast
- Kenya
- Libya
- Mali
- Mauritania
- Niger
- Nigeria (hosts)
- Senegal
- Sierra Leone
- South Africa
- Tanzania
- Tunisia
- Uganda
- Zambia

== Medal table ==
* Host nation (Nigeria)

Rank	Nation	Gold	Silver	Bronze	Total
1	Nigeria (NGR)*	114	65	55	234
2	Algeria (ALG)	64	22	22	108
3	Kenya (KEN)	21	17	12	50
4	Ghana (GHA)	7	14	15	36
5	Ethiopia (ETH)	6	8	2	16
6	Tunisia (TUN)	5	16	12	33
7	South Africa (RSA)	4	6	16	26
8	Libya (LBA)	4	6	4	14
9	Uganda (UGA)	4	4	1	9
10	Tanzania (TAN)	2	1	2	5
11	Senegal (SEN)	1	3	11	15
12	Cameroon (CMR)	1	3	1	5
13	Burkina Faso (BUR)	1	1	3	5
14	Mali (MLI)	0	1	1	2
15	Cape Verde (CPV)	0	0	1	1
15	(Republic of the Congo) Congo (CGO)	0	0	1	1
Totals (16 entries)		234	167	159	560
