= African Military Games =

Multi-sport event

- Purpose: Multi-sport event for athletes with physical disabilities from nations on the African continent
- Frequency: Every 10 years
- Inaugurated: 2002 African Military Games in Nairobi, Kenya
- Most recent: 2024 African Military Games in Abuja, Nigeria
- Next event: TBD

African Military Games
- 2002; 2024
- Archery; Athletics; Badminton; Basketball; Boxing; Cycling; Fencing; Field hockey; Football; Golf; Handball; Karate; Judo; Shooting; Swimming; Table tennis; Taekwondo; Tennis; Volleyball; Wrestling

The African Military Games is a multi-sport event contested by military athletes from African nations.

== History ==
In 2002, the International Military Sports Council (CISM) with the collaboration of the Organization of Military Sport in Africa (OSMA) decided to organise the first African Military Games in Nairobi, Kenya. Thirty-two African nations, four of which were present as observers, took part in the first edition, indeed, Africa is the first continent represented in CISM to have organised a multisport event on such a scale. The first African Military Games, attended also by many African Political and sports figures. Witch generated huge added value in terms of visibility for OSMA on the continent.

== List of African Military Games ==
Host cities of the African Para Games

No	Year	Host city	Dates	Opened by	Nations	Competitors			Sports	Events	Top country on medal table	Ref.
No	Year	Host city	Dates	Opened by	Nations	M	W	Total	Sports	Events	Top country on medal table	Ref.
1	2002	(Kenya) Nairobi	17 - 27 April	Daniel arap Moi	32			1562	11		Nigeria (NGR)	
–	2006	(Tunisia) Tunis	Canceled									
–	2012	(Nigeria) Abuja	Canceled									
2	2024	(Nigeria) Abuja	18 - 30 November	Kashim Shettima (Note: Vice President of Nigeria, representing Bola Tinubu, President of Nigeria and commander-in-chief of the Nigerian Armed Forces.)	25			1625	20		Nigeria (NGR)	
3	TBD	(Algeria) TBD										

== Sports ==
- Archery
- Athletics
- Badminton
- Basketball
- Boxing
- Cycling
- Fencing
- Field hockey
- Football
- Golf
- Handball
- Judo
- Karate
- Shooting
- Swimming
- Table tennis
- Taekwondo
- Tennis
- Volleyball
- Wrestling

== See also ==
- World Military Games
- African Games
- African Para Games
- African School Games
