= David Kirui =

Kenyan sprinter

Personal information
- Nationality: Kenyan
- Born: 15 December 1974 (age 51)

Sport
- Sport: Sprinting
- Event: 400 metres

David Kirui (born 15 December 1974) is a Kenyan sprinter. He competed in the men's 400 metres at the 2000 Summer Olympics.
