= Davis Kamoga =

Ugandan sprinter (born 1968)

Medal record

Men's athletics

Representing Uganda

Olympic Games
| Bronze medal – third place | 1996 Atlanta | 400 m |

World Championships
| Silver medal – second place | 1997 Athens | 400 m |

African Championships
| Silver medal – second place | 1998 Dakar | 400 m |

Davis Kamoga (born July 17, 1968) is a Ugandan athlete specializing in the 400 metres. He won the bronze medal at the 1996 Summer Olympics in Atlanta, Georgia.

In 1997, he secured Uganda's first-ever medal at the World Championships, a silver medal in the 1997 World Championships in Athens with a personal best time of 44.37 seconds. This remains the national record and ranks him fourth in Africa, behind Innocent Egbunike, Samson Kitur and Charles Gitonga.

== Personal life ==
Kamoga is married to Florence Kalibala whom he met at a tournament in 1975.
