= 1998 World Junior Championships in Athletics – Men's 400 metres =

The men's 400 metres event at the 1998 World Junior Championships in Athletics was held in Annecy, France, at Parc des Sports on 28, 29 and 31 July.

== Medalists ==
Gold	Nduka Awazie; Nigeria
Silver	Casey Vincent; Australia
Bronze	Fawzi Al-Shammari; Kuwait

== Results ==
=== Final ===
31 July

Rank	Name	Nationality	Time	Notes
1st place, gold medalist(s)	Nduka Awazie	Nigeria	45.54	
2nd place, silver medalist(s)	Casey Vincent	Australia	45.55	
3rd place, bronze medalist(s)	Fawzi Al-Shammari	Kuwait	45.89	
4	Marc-Alexander Scheer	Germany	45.91	
5	Simon Pierre	Trinidad and Tobago	46.22	
6	Andrew Pierce	United States	46.30	
7	Alloy Wilson	United Kingdom	46.64	
8	Tony Berrian	United States	47.30	

=== Semifinals ===
29 July

==== Semifinal 1 ====
Rank	Name	Nationality	Time	Notes
1	Andrew Pierce	United States	46.32	Q
2	Fawzi Al-Shammari	Kuwait	46.40	Q
3	Marc-Alexander Scheer	Germany	46.57	q
4	Kim Jae-Da	South Korea	46.94	
5	Amin Goma'a	Egypt	47.60	
6	Xu Zizhou	China	47.62	
7	David Naismith	United Kingdom	47.73	
8	Liam Card	Canada	48.03	

==== Semifinal 2 ====
Rank	Name	Nationality	Time	Notes
1	Casey Vincent	Australia	46.49	Q
2	Simon Pierre	Trinidad and Tobago	46.66	Q
3	Alloy Wilson	United Kingdom	46.69	q
4	Ousmane Niang	Senegal	46.88	
5	Ruwen Faller	Germany	46.96	
6	Fernando Augustin	Mauritius	47.42	
7	Evanson Ndungu	Kenya	47.51	
8	Przemyslaw Dunaj	Poland	48.03	

==== Semifinal 3 ====
Rank	Name	Nationality	Time	Notes
1	Nduka Awazie	Nigeria	45.90	Q
2	Tony Berrian	United States	46.56	Q
3	Tom Coman	Ireland	46.82	
4	Masayuki Okusako	Japan	47.36	
5	Daniel Batman	Australia	47.41	
6	Hamdan Al-Bishi	Saudi Arabia	47.47	
7	Luys Freitas	Portugal	48.11	
8	William Hernández	Venezuela	48.77	

=== Heats ===
28 July

==== Heat 1 ====
Rank	Name	Nationality	Time	Notes
1	Nduka Awazie	Nigeria	46.76	Q
2	Ousmane Niang	Senegal	47.01	Q
3	Fawzi Al-Shammari	Kuwait	47.42	Q
4	Sanjay Ayre	Jamaica	47.51	
5	Michał Węglarski	Poland	47.57	
6	Casper Pule	Solomon Islands	49.65	
7	Charles Shaw	Liberia	51.32	

==== Heat 2 ====
Rank	Name	Nationality	Time	Notes
1	Andrew Pierce	United States	46.51	Q
2	Tom Coman	Ireland	47.14	Q
3	Daniel Batman	Australia	47.17	Q
4	David Naismith	United Kingdom	47.47	q
5	Ranga Wimalawansa	Sri Lanka	47.55	
6	Mohamed Bezegrari	Algeria	49.39	

==== Heat 3 ====
Rank	Name	Nationality	Time	Notes
1	Hamdan Al-Bishi	Saudi Arabia	46.93	Q
2	Evanson Ndungu	Kenya	47.04	Q
3	Ruwen Faller	Germany	47.08	Q
4	Fernando Augustin	Mauritius	47.31	q
5	Paul Oppermann	Ireland	47.81	
6	Alexander Petrov	Bulgaria	48.72	
7	Isaac Yaya	Tahiti	50.10	

==== Heat 4 ====
Rank	Name	Nationality	Time	Notes
1	Alloy Wilson	United Kingdom	46.81	Q
2	Xu Zizhou	China	46.92	Q
3	Simon Pierre	Trinidad and Tobago	46.99	Q
4	Masayuki Okusako	Japan	47.37	q
5	Ahmed Torkhani	Tunisia	48.08	
6	Damian Spector	Argentina	48.35	
7	Harmon Harmon	Cook Islands	51.82	

==== Heat 5 ====
Rank	Name	Nationality	Time	Notes
1	Casey Vincent	Australia	46.87	Q
2	Luys Freitas	Portugal	47.66	Q
3	William Hernández	Venezuela	47.81	Q
4	Takahiko Yamamura	Japan	47.95	
5	Andrea Barberi	Italy	47.96	
6	Ryad Cheragui	Algeria	49.77	

==== Heat 6 ====
Rank	Name	Nationality	Time	Notes
1	Kim Jae-Da	South Korea	47.17	Q
2	Marc-Alexander Scheer	Germany	47.27	Q
3	Przemyslaw Dunaj	Poland	48.08	Q
4	Marc Reuter	Luxembourg	48.28	
5	Vicente Erut	Argentina	49.14	
6	Edward Grech	Malta	51.21	

==== Heat 7 ====
Rank	Name	Nationality	Time	Notes
1	Tony Berrian	United States	47.06	Q
2	Amin Goma'a	Egypt	47.57	Q
3	Liam Card	Canada	47.71	Q
4	Tshepo Thobelangope	South Africa	47.90	
5	Hicham Mihjane	Morocco	48.03	
6	Clement Abai	Papua New Guinea	48.41	
7	Troy Wickham	Barbados	48.65	

== Participation ==
According to an unofficial count, 46 athletes from 37 countries participated in the event.

- Algeria (2)
- Argentina (2)
- Australia (2)
- Barbados (1)
- Bulgaria (1)
- Canada (1)
- China (1)
- Cook Islands (1)
- Egypt (1)
- Germany (2)
- Ireland (2)
- Italy (1)
- Jamaica (1)
- Japan (2)
- Kenya (1)
- Kuwait (1)
- Liberia (1)
- Luxembourg (1)
- Malta (1)
- Mauritius (1)
- Morocco (1)
- Nigeria (1)
- Papua New Guinea (1)
- Poland (2)
- Portugal (1)
- Saudi Arabia (1)
- Senegal (1)
- Solomon Islands (1)
- South Africa (1)
- South Korea (1)
- Sri Lanka (1)
- Tahiti (1)
- Trinidad and Tobago (1)
- Tunisia (1)
- United Kingdom (2)
- United States (2)
- Venezuela (1)
