= Athletics at the 1998 Commonwealth Games – Men's 4 × 400 metres relay =

Men's 4 × 400 metres relay at the Commonwealth Games

The men's 4 × 400 metres relay event at the 1998 Commonwealth Games was held 20–21 September on National Stadium, Bukit Jalil.

== Medalists ==
Gold	Silver	Bronze
Jamaica; Michael McDonald; Roxbert Martin; Greg Haughton; Davian Clarke	England; Paul Slythe; Solomon Wariso; Mark Hylton; Mark Richardson; Sean Baldock*; Jared Deacon*	Wales; Paul Gray; Jamie Baulch; Matthew Elias; Iwan Thomas

* Athletes who competed in heats only and received medals.

== Results ==
=== Heats ===
Qualification: First 3 teams of each heat (Q) plus the next 2 fastest (q) qualified for the final.

Rank	Heat	Nation	Athletes	Time	Notes
1	1	Zimbabwe	Jeffrey Masvanhise, Philip Mukomana, Savieri Ngidhi, Kenneth Harnden	3:03.30	Q
2	1	England	Sean Baldock, Jared Deacon, Solomon Wariso, Paul Slythe	3:03.58	Q
3	1	Wales	Paul Gray, Jamie Baulch, Matthew Elias, Iwan Thomas	3:03.63	Q
4	1	Canada	Monte Raymond, Shane Niemi, Donald Bruno, Alexandre Marchand	3:03.69	q
5	1	Kenya	Abednego Matilu, Kennedy Kimwetich, Erick Keter, Kennedy Ochieng	3:05.56	
6	1	Bahamas	Chris Brown, Timothy Munnings, Gregory Chipman, Carl Oliver	3:05.87	
7	1	Northern Ireland	Brian Forbes, Edward King, Matthew Douglas, Paul McBurney	3:07.27	
8	1	Namibia	Christoffel van Wyk, Erwin Naimwhaka, Mao Tjiroze, Veranus Kamati	3:11.60	NR
	2	Jamaica		?:??.??	
	2	South Africa		?:??.??	
	2	Australia	Michael Hazel, Brad Jamieson, Casey Vincent, Patrick Dwyer	3:02.94	
	1	Sri Lanka		?:??.??	
5	2	Fiji	Aminiasi Babitu, Henry Semiti, Solomone Bole, Soloveni Nakaunicina	3:07.15	
6	2	Mauritius	Clario Augustin, Eric Milazar, Fernando Augustin, Rudy Tirvengadum	3:08.09	
7	2	Malaysia	Mohd Zaiful Zainal Abidin, Yazid Parlan, Deverajo Nadarajan, Romzi Bakar	3:08.18	

=== Final ===
Rank	Nation	Athletes	Time	Notes
1st place, gold medalist(s)	Jamaica	Michael McDonald, Roxbert Martin, Greg Haughton, Davian Clarke	2:59.03	GR
2nd place, silver medalist(s)	England	Paul Slythe, Solomon Wariso, Mark Hylton, Mark Richardson	3:00.82	
3rd place, bronze medalist(s)	Wales	Paul Gray, Jamie Baulch, Matthew Elias, Iwan Thomas	3:01.86	NR
4	South Africa	Adriaan Botha, Johan Botha, Hezekiel Sepeng, Arnaud Malherbe	3:02.21	
5	Australia	Michael Hazel, Brad Jamieson, Casey Vincent, Patrick Dwyer	3:02.96	
6	Zimbabwe	Jeffrey Masvanhise, Philip Mukomana, Savieri Ngidhi, Kenneth Harnden	3:03.02	
7	Sri Lanka	Rohan Handunpurage, Rathna Vellasamy, Ranga Wimalawansa, Sugath Thilakaratne	3:04.11	
8	Canada	Shane Niemi, Monte Raymond, Alexandre Marchand, Donald Bruno	3:04.84	
