= Athletics at the 2000 Summer Olympics – Men's 4 × 400 metres relay =

Men's 4 × 400 metres relay at the Games of the XXVII Olympiad
- Venue: Stadium Australia
- Date: 29 September 2000 (round 1); 30 September 2000 (final)
- Competitors: 152 from 34 nations
- Teams: 152
- Winning time: 2:58.78

Medalists
1st place, gold medalist(s)		Clement Chukwu, Jude Monye, Sunday Bada, Enefiok Udo-Obong, Nduka Awazie*, Fidelis Gadzama*	Nigeria
2nd place, silver medalist(s)		Christopher Williams, Michael Blackwood, Gregory Haughton, Danny McFarlane, Sanjay Ayre*, Michael McDonald*	Jamaica
3rd place, bronze medalist(s)		Avard Moncur, Troy McIntosh, Carl Oliver, Chris Brown, Timothy Munnings** * Athletes who participated in the heats only and received medals.	Bahamas

The 4 × 400 metres relay races at the 2000 Summer Olympics as part of the athletics program were held on 29 and 30 September. The winning margin was 0.10 seconds which as of 2023 remains the narrowest winning margin in this event at the Olympics since the introduction of fully automatic timing. The top two teams in each of the initial five heats automatically qualified for the semi-final. The next six fastest teams from across the heats also qualified. The top three teams in each of the semi-finals automatically qualified for the final. The next two fastest team from the semi-finals also qualified.

The United States, with Alvin Harrison, Antonio Pettigrew, Calvin Harrison and Michael Johnson, originally won the gold medal. On 18 July 2004, the International Association of Athletics Federations (IAAF) ruled that Jerome Young was ineligible to compete in Sydney and annulled all his past results, including those achieved as part of relay teams. Young had competed for the USA team in the heats and semi-final of this event. Therefore, the United States team was stripped of the gold medal and Nigeria, Jamaica, and the Bahamas were moved up one position each. On 22 July 2005, the Court of Arbitration for Sport (CAS) overturned this decision and restored the original finish order of the race based on a ruling that a team should not be disqualified because of a doping offense by an athlete who did not compete in the finals.

In June 2008, Antonio Pettigrew "admitted in U.S. court that he breached the rules" by using banned performance-enhancing substances, and agreed to return his gold medal. Michael Johnson announced that he would return his own gold medal, won as part of the relay team with Pettigrew. Johnson stated that he felt "cheated, betrayed and let down" by what Pettigrew had done at the Games. On 12 July 2012, the IOC confirmed the medal reallocation.

== Records ==
These were the standing world and Olympic records (in minutes) prior to the 2000 Summer Olympics.

World record	2:54.20	(United States) Jerome Young (United States) Antonio Pettigrew (United States) Tyree Washington (United States) Michael Johnson	Uniondale (USA)	22 July 1998
Olympic record	2:55.74	(United States) Andrew Valmon (United States) Quincy Watts (United States) Michael Johnson (United States) Steve Lewis	Barcelona (ESP)	8 August 1992

The IOC formally withdrew the US gold medals on 2 August 2008.

== Results ==
=== Heats ===
Heat 1 of 5 Date: Friday 29 September 2000
Place		Nation	Athletes	Lane	Reaction	Time	Qual.	Record
Heat	Overall	Nation	Athletes	Lane	Reaction	Time	Qual.	Record
1	6	Jamaica	Michael McDonald, Michael Blackwood, Sanjay Ayre, Danny McFarlane	2	0.202 s	3:03.85	Q	
2	10	Great Britain	Jared Deacon, Daniel Caines, Jamie Baulch, Iwan Thomas	6	0.218 s	3:04.35	Q	SB
3	11	France	Emmanuel Front, Marc Foucan, Pierre-Marie Hilaire, Bruno Wavelet	8	0.416 s	3:04.45	q	SB
4	16	Switzerland	Laurent Clerc, Alain Rohr, Nicolas Bäriswyl, André Bucher	4		3:06.01		
5	20	Spain	Eduardo Iván Rodríguez, David Canal, Iñigo Monreal, Antonio Andrés	5	0.178 s	3:06.87		SB
6	26	Hungary	Zétény Dombi, Zsolt Szeglet, Attila Kilvinger, Tibor Bédi	7	0.354 s	3:08.77		
7	29	Slovenia	Boštjan Horvat, Jože Vrtačič, Sergej Šalamon, Matija Šestak	3	0.284 s	3:10.07		

Heat 2 of 5 Date: Friday 29 September 2000
Place		Nation	Athletes	Lane	Reaction	Time	Qual.	Record
Heat	Overall	Nation	Athletes	Lane	Reaction	Time	Qual.	Record
1	17	Sri Lanka	Manura Kuranage Perera, Rohan Pradeep Kumara, Ranga Wimalawansa, Sugath Tillakeratne	7	0.203 s	3:06.25	Q	
2	19	Kenya	Ezra Sambu, Samson Yego, Joseph Mwengi Mutua, Julius Chepkwony	2	0.262 s	3:06.77	Q	
3	23	Ireland	Paul McKee, Tomas Coman, Robert Daly, Paul Opperman	6	0.170 s	3:07.42		
4	25	India	Lijo David Thottan, Jata Shankar, Purukottam Ramachandran, Paramjit Singh	5	0.255 s	3:08.38		
		Algeria	Malik-Khaled Louahla, Kamel Talhaoui, Samir-Adel Louahla, Adem Hecini	4	0.497 s	DQ		
		Qatar	Ibrahim Ismail Muftah, Mubarak Al-Nubi, Salaheddine Safi Bakar, Ahmed Al-Imam	3	0.295 s	DQ		

Heat 3 of 5 Date: Friday 29 September 2000
Place		Nation	Athletes	Lane	Reaction	Time	Qual.	Record
Heat	Overall	Nation	Athletes	Lane	Reaction	Time	Qual.	Record
1	5	United States	Jerome Young, Angelo Taylor, Calvin Harrison, Alvin Harrison	4	0.163 s	3:03.52	Q	
2	7	South Africa	Alwyn Myburgh, Hendrick Mokganyetsi, Werner Botha, Arnaud Malherbe	7	0.223 s	3:04.08	Q	SB
3	8	Australia	Casey Vincent, Blair Young, Michael Hazel, Patrick Dwyer	8	0.220 s	3:04.13	q	SB
4	14	Ukraine	Oleksandr Kaydash, Roman Voronko, Yevgeniy Zyukov, Gennadiy Gorbenko	5	0.568 s	3:05.41	q	SB
5	18	Greece	Georgios Oikonomidis, Anastasios Gousis, Stilianos Dimotsios, Periklis Iakovakis	6	0.259 s	3:06.50		
6	28	Saudi Arabia	Hamed Hamadan Al-Bishi, Hamdan Obah Al-Bishi, Mohammed Albeshi, Hadi Soua'an Al-Somaily	2	0.302 s	3:09.57		
7	30	Thailand	Jirachai Linglom, Senee Kongtong, Chalermpol Noohlong, Narong Nilploy	3	0.296 s	3:11.65		

Heat 4 of 5 Date: Friday 29 September 2000
Place		Nation	Athletes	Lane	Reaction	Time	Qual.	Record
Heat	Overall	Nation	Athletes	Lane	Reaction	Time	Qual.	Record
1	12	Japan	Shunji Karube, Jun Osakada, Kenji Tabata, Takahiko Yamamura	5	0.559 s	3:05.21	Q	
2	13	Russia	Dmitriy Bogdanov, Andrey Semyonov, Ruslan Mashchenko, Dmitriy Golovastov	2	0.203 s	3:05.37	Q	SB
3	15	Zimbabwe	Crispen Mutakanyi, Tawanda Chiwira, Phillip Mukomana, Ken Harnden	7	0.227 s	3:05.60		
4	21	Ghana	Daniel Adomako, Nathaniel Martey, Abu Duah, Daniel Mensah Kwei	6	0.582 s	3:07.07		
5	24	Trinidad and Tobago	Damion Barry, Simon Pierre, Neil De Silva, Ato Modibo	8	0.171 s	3:07.51		
6	27	Slovakia	Radoslav Holúbek, Marcel Lopuchovsky, Marián Vanderka, Štefan Balošák	3	0.303 s	3:09.54		
		Kuwait	Musayed Al-Azimi, Bader Abdul Rahman Al-Fulaij, Mishal Sayed Al-Harbi, Fawzi Al-Shammari	4	0.557 s	DQ		

Heat 5 of 5 Date: Friday 29 September 2000
Place		Nation	Athletes	Lane	Reaction	Time	Qual.	Record
Heat	Overall	Nation	Athletes	Lane	Reaction	Time	Qual.	Record
1	1	Nigeria	Nduka Awazie, Clement Chukwu, Fidelis Gadzama, Enefiok Udo-Obong	5	0.562 s	3:01.20	Q	
2	2	Poland	Filip Walotka, Piotr Długosielski, Jacek Bocian, Robert Maćkowiak	8	0.502 s	3:01.30	Q	SB
3	3	Bahamas	Timothy Munnings, Troy McIntosh, Carl Oliver, Chris Brown	3	0.258 s	3:01.50	q	SB
4	4	Senegal	Oumar Loum, Ousmane Niang, Youssoupha Sarr, Ibou Faye	2	0.266 s	3:02.67	q	SB
5	9	Botswana	California Molefe, Lulu Basinyi, Johnson Kubisa, Agrippa Matshameko	4	0.562 s	3:04.19	q	NR
6	22	FR Yugoslavia	Branislav Stojanović, Slaviša Vraneš, Marko Janković, Siniša Peša	6	0.551 s	3:07.41		
		Croatia	Elvis Peršić, Nino Habun, Frano Bakarić, Darko Juričić	7	0.420 s	DQ		

Round 1- Overall

Round 1 Overall Results
Place	Nation	Athletes	Heat	Lane	Place	Reaction	Time	Qual.	Record
1	Nigeria	Nduka Awazie, Clement Chukwu, Fidelis Gadzama, Enefiok Udo-Obong	5	5	1	0.562 s	3:01.20	Q	
2	Poland	Filip Walotka, Piotr Długosielski, Jacek Bocian, Robert Maćkowiak	5	8	2	0.502 s	3:01.30	Q	SB
3	Bahamas	Timothy Munnings, Troy McIntosh, Carl Oliver, Chris Brown	5	3	3	0.258 s	3:01.50	q	SB
4	Senegal	Oumar Loum, Ousmane Niang, Youssoupha Sarr, Ibou Faye	5	2	4	0.266 s	3:02.67	q	SB
5	United States	Jerome Young, Angelo Taylor, Calvin Harrison, Alvin Harrison	3	4	1	0.163 s	3:03.52	Q	
6	Jamaica	Michael McDonald, Michael Blackwood, Sanjay Ayre, Danny McFarlane	1	2	1	0.202 s	3:04.85	Q	
7	South Africa	Alwyn Myburgh, Hendrick Mokganyetsi, Werner Botha, Arnaud Malherbe	3	7	2	0.223 s	3:04.08	Q	SB
8	Australia	Casey Vincent, Blair Young, Michael Hazel, Patrick Dwyer	3	8	3	0.220 s	3:04.13	q	SB
9	Botswana	California Molefe, Lulu Basinyi, Johnson Kubisa, Agrippa Matshameko	5	4	5	0.562 s	3:04.19	q	NR
10	Great Britain	Jared Deacon, Daniel Caines, Jamie Baulch, Iwan Thomas	1	6	2	0.218 s	3:04.35	Q	SB
11	France	Emmanuel Front, Marc Foucan, Pierre-Marie Hilaire, Bruno Wavelet	1	8	3	0.416 s	3:04.45	q	SB
12	Japan	Shunji Karube, Jun Osakada, Kenji Tabata, Takahiko Yamamura	4	5	1	0.559 s	3:05.21	Q	
13	Russia	Dmitriy Bogdanov, Andrey Semyonov, Ruslan Mashchenko, Dmitriy Golovastov	4	2	2	0.203 s	3:05.37	Q	SB
14	Ukraine	Oleksandr Kaydash, Roman Voronkov, Yevgeniy Zyukov, Gennadiy Gorbenko	3	5	4	0.568 s	3:05.41	q	SB
15	Zimbabwe	Crispen Mutakanyi, Tawanda Chiwira, Phillip Mukomana, Ken Harnden	4	7	3	0.227 s	3:05.60		
16	Switzerland	Laurent Clerc, Alain Rohr, Nicolas Baeriswyl, André Bucher	1	4	4		3:06.01		
17	Sri Lanka	Manura Lanka Perera, Rohan Pradeep Kumara, Ranga Wimalawansa, Sugath Tillakeratne	2	7	1	0.203 s	3:06.25	Q	
18	Greece	Georgios Oikonomidis, Anastasios Gousis, Stilianos Dimotsios, Periklis Iakovakis	3	6	5	0.259 s	3:06.50		
19	Kenya	Ezra Sambu, Samson Yego, Joseph Mwengi Mutua, Julius Chepkwony	2	2	2	0.262 s	3:06.77	Q	
20	Spain	Eduardo Iván Rodríguez, David Canal, Iñigo Monreal, Antonio Andrés	1	5	5	0.178 s	3:06.87		SB
21	Ghana	Daniel Adomako, Nathaniel Martey, Abu Duah, Daniel Mensah Kwei	4	6	4	0.582 s	3:07.07		
22	FR Yugoslavia	Branislav Stojanovic, Slavisa Vranes, Marko Jankovic, Siniša Peša	5	6	6	0.551 s	3:07.41		
23	Ireland	Paul McKee, Tomas Coman, Robert Daly, Paul Opperman	2	6	3	0.170 s	3:07.42		
24	Trinidad and Tobago	Damion Barry, Simon Pierre, Neil De Silva, Ato Modibo	4	8	5	0.171 s	3:07.51		
25	India	Lijo David Thottan, Jata Shankar, Purukottam Ramachandran, Paramjit Singh	2	5	4	0.255 s	3:08.38		
26	Hungary	Zétény Dombi, Zsolt Szeglet, Attila Kilvinger, Tibor Bédi	1	7	6	0.354 s	3:08.77		
27	Slovakia	Radoslav Holúbek, Marcel Lopuchovsky, Marián Vanderka, Štefan Balošák	4	3	6	0.303 s	3:09.54		
28	Saudi Arabia	Hamed Hamadan Al-Bishi, Hamdan Obah Al-Bishi, Mohammed Albeshi, Hadi Soua'an Al-Somaily	3	2	6	0.302 s	3:09.57		
29	Slovenia	Boštjan Horvat, Joze Vrtačič, Sergej Salamon, Matija Šestak	1	3	7	0.284 s	3:10.07		
30	Thailand	Jirachai Linglom, Senee Kongtong, Chalermpol Noohlong, Narong Nilploy	3	3	7	0.296 s	3:11.65		
	Algeria	Malik-Khaled Louahla, Kamel Talhaoui, Samir-Adel Louahla, Adem Hecini	2	4		0.497 s	DQ		
	Croatia	Elvis Persic, Nino Habun, Frano Bakaric, Darko Juricic	5	7		0.420 s	DQ		
	Kuwait	Musad Al Azimi, Bader Al Fulaij, Mishal Al Harbi, Fawzi Al Shammari	4	4		0.557 s	DQ		
	Qatar	Ibrahim Ismail Muftah, Mubarak Al-Nubi, Salaheddine Safi Bakar, Ahmed Al-Imam	2	3		0.295 s	DQ		

=== Semi-finals ===
Heat 1 of 2 Date: Friday 29 September 2000
Place		Nation	Athletes	Lane	Reaction	Time	Qual.	Record
Heat	Overall	Nation	Athletes	Lane	Reaction	Time	Qual.	Record
1	1	United States	Jerome Young, Angelo Taylor, Calvin Harrison, Alvin Harrison	3	0.242 s	2:58.78	Q	
2	2	Jamaica	Sanjay Ayre, Gregory Haughton, Danny McFarlane, Michael Blackwood	4	0.551 s	2:58.84	Q	SB
3	3	Bahamas	Avard Moncur, Troy McIntosh, Carl Oliver, Chris Brown	1	0.249 s	2:59.02	Q	NR
4	4	France	Emmanuel Front, Marc Foucan, Ibrahima Wade, Marc Raquil	8	0.249 s	3:00.64	q	SB
5	5	Poland	Piotr Rysiukiewicz, Piotr Haczek, Piotr Długosielski, Robert Maćkowiak	5	0.494 s	3:00.66	q	SB
6	7	South Africa	Alwyn Myburgh, Hezekiél Sepeng, Llewellyn Herbert, Arnaud Malherbe	6	0.172 s	3:01.25		SB
7	14	Botswana	California Molefe, Lulu Basinyi, Johnson Kubisa, Glody Dube)	2	0.345 s	3:05.28		
		Kenya	Ezra Sambu, Samson Yego, Joseph Mwengi Mutua, Julius Chepkwony	7	0.413 s	DQ		

Heat 2 of 2 Date: Friday 29 September 2000
Place		Nation	Athletes	Lane	Reaction	Time	Qual.	Record
Heat	Overall	Nation	Athletes	Lane	Reaction	Time	Qual.	Record
1	6	Nigeria	Clement Chukwu, Jude Monye, Enefiok Udo-Obong, Sunday Bada	3	0.297 s	3:01.06	Q	
2	8	Great Britain	Jared Deacon, Daniel Caines, Iwan Thomas, Jamie Baulch	5	0.490 s	3:01.35	Q	SB
3	9	Australia	Casey Vincent, Blair Young, Patrick Dwyer, Michael Hazel	2	0.198 s	3:01.91	Q	SB
4	10	Russia	Andrey Semyonov, Dmitriy Bogdanov, Ruslan Mashchenko, Dmitriy Golovastov	1	0.219 s	3:02.28		SB
5	11	Ukraine	Oleksandr Kaydash, Roman Voronkov, Yevgeniy Zyukov, Gennadiy Gorbenko	8	0.244 s	3:02.68		NR
6	12	Sri Lanka	Rohan Pradeep Kumara, Ratna Kumar, Ranga Wimalawansa, Sugath Tillakeratne	6	0.507 s	3:02.89		
7	13	Senegal	Oumar Loum, Ousmane Niang, Youssoupha Sarr, Ibou Faye)	7	0.175 s	3:02.94		
8	15	Japan	Shunji Karube, Jun Osakada, Kenji Tabata, Takahiko Yamamura	4	0.520 s	3:13.63		

Semi-Finals Overall Results
Place	Nation	Athletes	Heat	Lane	Place	Reaction	Time	Qual.	Record
1	United States	Jerome Young, Angelo Taylor, Calvin Harrison, Alvin Harrison	1	3	1	0.242 s	2:58.78	Q	
2	Jamaica	Sanjay Ayre, Gregory Haughton, Danny McFarlane, Michael Blackwood	1	4	2	0.551 s	2:58.84	Q	SB
3	Bahamas	Avard Moncur, Troy McIntosh, Carl Oliver, Chris Brown	1	1	3	0.249 s	2:59.02	Q	NR
4	France	Emmanuel Front, Marc Foucan, Ibrahima Wade, Marc Raquil	1	8	4	0.249 s	3:00.64	q	SB
5	Poland	Piotr Rysiukiewicz, Piotr Haczek, Piotr Długosielski, Robert Maćkowiak	1	5	5	0.494 s	3:00.66	q	SB
6	Nigeria	Clement Chukwu, Jude Monye, Enefiok Udo-Obong, Sunday Bada	2	3	1	0.297 s	3:01.06	Q	
7	South Africa	Alwyn Myburgh, Hezekiél Sepeng, Llewellyn Herbert, Arnaud Malherbe	1	6	6	0.172 s	3:01.25		SB
8	Great Britain	Jared Deacon, Daniel Caines, Iwan Thomas, Jamie Baulch	2	5	2	0.490 s	3:01.35	Q	SB
9	Australia	Casey Vincent, Blair Young, Patrick Dwyer, Michael Hazel	2	2	3	0.198 s	3:01.91	Q	SB
10	Russia	Andrey Semyonov, Dmitriy Bogdanov, Ruslan Mashchenko, Dmitriy Golovastov	2	1	4	0.219 s	3:02.28		SB
11	Ukraine	Oleksandr Kaydash, Roman Voronkov, Yevgeniy Zyukov, Gennadiy Gorbenko	2	8	5	0.244 s	3:02.68		NR
12	Sri Lanka	Rohan Pradeep Kumara, Ratna Kumar, Ranga Wimalawansa, Sugath Tillakeratne	2	6	6	0.507 s	3:02.89		
13	Senegal	Oumar Loum, Ousmane Niang, Youssoupha Sarr, Ibou Faye	2	7	7	0.175 s	3:02.94		
14	Botswana	California Molefe, Lulu Basinyi, Johnson Kubisa, Glody Dube	1	2	7	0.345 s	3:05.28		
15	Japan	Shunji Karube, Jun Osakada, Kenji Tabata, Takahiko Yamamura	2	4	8	0.520 s	3:13.63		
	Kenya	Ezra Sambu, Samson Yego, Joseph Mwengi Mutua, Julius Chepkwony	1	7		0.413 s	DQ		

=== Final ===
Final Date: Friday 29 September 2000
Place	Nation	Athletes	Lane	Reaction	Time	Record
Gold medal	Nigeria	Clement Chukwu, Jude Monye, Sunday Bada, Enefiok Udo-Obong	4	0.541 s	2:58.68	AR
Silver medal	Jamaica	Michael Blackwood, Gregory Haughton, Christopher Williams, Danny McFarlane	6	0.382 s	2:58.78	SB
Bronze medal	Bahamas	Avard Moncur, Troy McIntosh, Carl Oliver, Chris Brown	1	0.260 s	2:59.23	
4	France	Emmanuel Front, Marc Foucan, Ibrahima Wade, Marc Raquil	2	0.252s	3:01.02	SB
5	Great Britain	Jared Deacon, Daniel Caines, Iwan Thomas, Jamie Baulch	3	0.252 s	3:01.22	SB
6	Poland	Piotr Rysiukiewicz, Robert Maćkowiak, Piotr Długosielski, Piotr Haczek	8	0.203s	3:03.22	
7	Australia	Brad Jamieson, Blair Young, Patrick Dwyer, Michael Hazel	7	0.177 s	3:03.91	
DQ	United States	Alvin Harrison, Antonio Pettigrew, Calvin Harrison, Michael Johnson	5		2:56.35	
