= 1998 World Junior Championships in Athletics – Men's 4 × 400 metres relay =

The men's 4x400 metres relay event at the 1998 World Junior Championships in Athletics was held in Annecy, France, at Parc des Sports on 1 and 2 August.

== Medalists ==
Gold	Daniel McFarlane; Daniel Batman; Scott Thom; Casey Vincent; Australia
Silver	Tony Berrian; Kevin Baker; Brian Swarn; Andrew Pierce; United States
Bronze	Sanjay Ayre; Leroy Colquhoun; Omar Henry; Dwayne Miller; Jamaica

== Results ==
=== Final ===
2 August

Rank	Nation	Competitors	Time	Notes
1st place, gold medalist(s)	Australia	Daniel McFarlane; Daniel Batman; Scott Thom; Casey Vincent	3:04.74	
2nd place, silver medalist(s)	United States	Tony Berrian; Kevin Baker; Brian Swarn; Andrew Pierce	3:05.06	
3rd place, bronze medalist(s)	Jamaica	Sanjay Ayre; Leroy Colquhoun; Omar Henry; Dwayne Miller	3:05.31	
4	Germany	Arne Macher; Marc-Alexander Scheer; Ralf Riester; Ruwen Faller	3:05.84	
5	United Kingdom	David Naismith; Daniel Caines; Chris Carson; Alloy Wilson	3:06.32	
6	Poland	Przemyslaw Dunaj; Filip Walotka; Maciej Ryszkowski; Michał Węglarski	3:07.70	
7	Greece	Evággelos Moustakidis; Anastasios Goúsis; Yeóryios Doúpis; Periklís Iakovákis	3:09.70	
8	Japan	Masayuki Okusako; Takahiko Yamamura; Hirofumi Nakagawa; Satoshi Oshikawa	3:10.54	

=== Heats ===
1 August

==== Heat 1 ====
Rank	Nation	Competitors	Time	Notes
1	United States	Tony Berrian; Reginald Depass; Brian Swarn; Andrew Pierce	3:06.62	Q
2	Australia	Daniel McFarlane; Daniel Batman; Bryce Barnwell; Casey Vincent	3:06.72	Q
3	Germany	Arne Macher; Ruwen Faller; Ralf Riester; Marc-Alexander Scheer	3:07.75	Q
4	Greece	Evággelos Moustakidis; Anastasios Goúsis; Yeóryios Doúpis; Periklís Iakovákis	3:08.54	Q
5	France	Arnaud Ignesta; Nicolas Colon; Urel Lacroix; Fabrice Zircon	3:12.92	
	Morocco	Hicham Mihjane; Abdelkabir Louraïbi; Mohamed Mouhlal; Chabib El-Azouizi	DQ	IAAF rule 170.10
	Russia	Kirill Sedykh; Dmitriy Bogdanov; Dmitriy Zhukov; Yuriy Borzakovskiy	DQ	IAAF rule 170.10

==== Heat 2 ====
Rank	Nation	Competitors	Time	Notes
1	Poland	Przemyslaw Dunaj; Maciej Ryszkowski; Filip Walotka; Michał Węglarski	3:08.35	Q
2	Jamaica	Collin Thomas; Sanjay Ayre; Omar Henry; Leroy Colquhoun	3:08.50	Q
3	United Kingdom	David Naismith; Adam Buckley; Chris Carson; Alloy Wilson	3:08.85	Q
4	Japan	Masayuki Okusako; Hirofumi Nakagawa; Satoshi Oshikawa; Takahiko Yamamura	3:10.22	Q
5	South Africa	Tshepo Thobelangope; Juan Pretorius; François Coetzee; Mandla Nkosi	3:10.34	
6	New Zealand	Nicholas O'Brien; Michael O'Connor; Khamal Ganley; Dallas Roberts	3:14.77	
	Algeria	Ryad Cheragui; Tahar Ghozali; Mohamed Bezegrari; Said Chabane	DQ	

== Participation ==
According to an unofficial count, 60 athletes from 14 countries participated in the event.

- Algeria (4)
- Australia (5)
- France (4)
- Germany (4)
- Greece (4)
- Jamaica (5)
- Japan (4)
- Morocco (4)
- New Zealand (4)
- Poland (4)
- Russia (4)
- South Africa (4)
- United Kingdom (5)
- United States (5)
