= 2004 IAAF World Indoor Championships – Men's 4 × 400 metres relay =

The Men's 4 × 400 metres relay event at the 2004 IAAF World Indoor Championships was held on March 7.

== Medalists ==
Gold	Silver	Bronze
Jamaica; Gregory Haughton; Leroy Colquhoun; Michael McDonald; Davian Clarke; Richard James*; Sanjay Ayre*	Russia; Dmitriy Forshev; Boris Gorban; Andrey Rudnitskiy; Aleksandr Usov	Ireland; Robert Daly; Gary Ryan; David Gillick; David McCarthy

* Runners who participated in the heats only and received medals.

== Results ==
=== Heats ===
Qualification: First 2 teams of each heat (Q) plus the next 2 fastest (q) advance to the final.

Rank	Heat	Nation	Athletes	Time	Notes
1	1	United States	James Carter, LaBronze Garrett, Jabari Pride, Godfrey Herring	3:07.58	Q, SB
2	1	Russia	Andrey Rudnitskiy, Boris Gorban, Aleksandr Usov, Dmitriy Forshev	3:07.60	Q, SB
3	2	Jamaica	Richard James, Sanjay Ayre, Leroy Colquhoun, Michael McDonald	3:08.70	Q, SB
4	1	Bahamas	Dennis Darling, Troy McIntosh, Timothy Munnings, Chris Brown	3:08.76	q, SB
5	1	Ireland	Robert Daly, Gary Ryan, David Gillick, David McCarthy	3:08.83	q, NR
6	2	Switzerland	Alain Rohr, Cédric El-Idrissi, Martin Leiser, Andreas Oggenfuss	3:09.04	Q, SB
7	2	Germany	Bastian Swillims, Ruwen Faller, Henning Kuschewitz, Sebastian Gatzka	3:09.26	SB
8	2	France	Rémi Wallard, Martial Yapo, Florent Lacasse, Olivier Galy	3:10.00	SB
9	2	Poland	Piotr Długosielski, Daniel Dąbrowski, Piotr Klimczak, Artur Gąsiewski	3:10.33	SB
10	1	Spain	Salvador Rodríguez, David Canal, Alberto Martínez, Luis Flores	3:10.95	SB
11	2	Hungary	Dávid Csesznegi, László Szabó, Ákos Dezsö, Zsolt Szeglet	3:12.20	SB

=== Final ===
Rank	Nation	Competitors	Time	Notes
1st place, gold medalist(s)	Jamaica	Gregory Haughton, Leroy Colquhoun, Michael McDonald, Davian Clarke	3:05.21	WL
2nd place, silver medalist(s)	Russia	Dmitriy Forshev, Boris Gorban, Andrey Rudnitskiy, Aleksandr Usov	3:06.23	SB
3rd place, bronze medalist(s)	Ireland	Robert Daly, Gary Ryan, David Gillick, David McCarthy	3:10.44	
4	Switzerland	Alain Rohr, Cédric El-Idrissi, Martin Leiser, Andreas Oggenfuss	3:12.62	
5	Bahamas	Chris Brown, Timothy Munnings, Andretti Bain, Dennis Darling	3:17.57	
	United States	James Carter, Milton Campbell, Joe Mendel, Godfrey Herring	DQ	
