= Athletics at the 1998 Commonwealth Games – Men's 400 metres =

Men's 400 metres at the Commonwealth Games

The men's 400 metres event at the 1998 Commonwealth Games was held 16–18 September on National Stadium, Bukit Jalil.

== Medalists ==
| Gold | Silver | Bronze |
|---|---|---|
| Iwan Thomas; Wales | Mark Richardson; England | Sugath Thilakaratne; Sri Lanka |

== Results ==
=== Heats ===
Qualification: First 4 of each heat (Q) and the next 8 fastest (q) qualified for the quarterfinals.

| Rank | Heat | Name | Nationality | Time | Notes |
|---|---|---|---|---|---|
| 1 | 1 | Roxbert Martin | Jamaica | 46.50? | Q |
| 2 | 1 | Patrick Dwyer | Australia | 46.58 | Q |
| 3 | 1 | Paul McBurney | Northern Ireland | 46.59 | Q |
| 4 | 1 | Solomon Wariso | England | 47.35 | Q |
| 5 | 1 | Kirthley Richardson | Anguilla | 51.93 | |
| | 1 | Silas Helo | Solomon Islands | DNS | |
| 1 | 2 | Kennedy Ochieng | Kenya | 46.14 | Q |
| 2 | 2 | Soloveni Nakaunicina | Fiji | 46.15 | Q |
| 3 | 2 | Arnaud Malherbe | South Africa | 46.16 | Q |
| 4 | 2 | Shane Niemi | Canada | 46.60 | Q |
| 5 | 2 | Johnson Kubisa | Botswana | 46.95 | q |
| 6 | 2 | Romzi Bakar | Malaysia | 47.21 | q |
| 7 | 2 | Bothwell Namuswa | Zambia | 48.74 | |
| 8 | 2 | Abdulla Ibrahim | Maldives | 52.77 | |
| 1 | 3 | Greg Haughton | Jamaica | 46.18 | Q |
| 2 | 3 | Iwan Thomas | Wales | 46.76 | Q |
| 3 | 3 | Declan Stack | Australia | 47.18 | Q |
| 4 | 3 | Brian Forbes | Northern Ireland | 47.41 | Q |
| 5 | 3 | Aminiasi Babitu | Fiji | 47.91 | |
| 6 | 3 | Arnold Payne | Zimbabwe | 48.22 | |
| 7 | 3 | Mohsin Munir | Pakistan | 49.46 | |
| 8 | 3 | Thyroid Smith | Turks and Caicos Islands | 53.18 | |
| 1 | 4 | Troy McIntosh | Bahamas | 46.37 | Q |
| 2 | 4 | Mark Hylton | England | 46.63 | Q |
| 3 | 4 | Tawanda Chiwira | Zimbabwe | 46.86 | Q |
| 4 | 4 | Hendrick Mokganyetsi | South Africa | 47.16 | Q |
| 5 | 4 | Evripides Demosthenous | Cyprus | 47.37 | q |
| 6 | 4 | Donald Bruno | Canada | 47.80 | q |
| 7 | 4 | Nadarajan Deverajo | Malaysia | 47.90 | q |
| 1 | 5 | Sugath Thilakaratne | Sri Lanka | 45.97 | Q |
| 2 | 5 | Jamie Baulch | Wales | 46.14 | Q |
| 3 | 5 | Davian Clarke | Jamaica | 46.42 | Q |
| 4 | 5 | Adriaan Botha | South Africa | 46.72 | Q |
| 5 | 5 | Lulu Basinyi | Botswana | 47.23 | q |
| 6 | 5 | Henry Semiti | Fiji | 47.26 | q |
| 7 | 5 | Erwin Naimwhaka | Namibia | 48.82 | |
| 8 | 5 | Naseer Ismail | Maldives | 50.54 | |
| 1 | 6 | Mark Richardson | England | 46.19 | Q |
| 2 | 6 | Jeffrey Masvanhise | Zimbabwe | 46.20 | Q |
| 3 | 6 | Abednego Matilu | Kenya | 46.25 | Q |
| 4 | 6 | Casey Vincent | Australia | 47.04 | Q |
| 5 | 6 | Fernando Augustin | Mauritius | 47.76 | q |
| 6 | 6 | Yazid Parlan | Malaysia | 48.18 | |
| 7 | 6 | N'Kosie Barnes | Antigua and Barbuda | 50.15 | |

=== Quarterfinals ===
Qualification: First 4 of each heat qualified directly (Q) for the semifinals.

| Rank | Heat | Name | Nationality | Time | Notes |
|---|---|---|---|---|---|
| 1 | 3 | Iwan Thomas | Wales | 45.26 | Q |
| 2 | 3 | Troy McIntosh | Bahamas | 45.42 | Q |
| 3 | 2 | Kennedy Ochieng | Kenya | 45.53 | Q |
| 4 | 2 | Mark Richardson | England | 45.54 | Q |
| 5 | 4 | Sugath Thilakaratne | Sri Lanka | 45.55 | Q |
| 6 | 1 | Jamie Baulch | Wales | 45.64 | Q |
| 6 | 3 | Abednego Matilu | Kenya | 45.64 | Q |
| 8 | 1 | Patrick Dwyer | Australia | 45.71 | Q |
| 8 | 2 | Arnaud Malherbe | South Africa | 45.71 | Q |
| 10 | 3 | Greg Haughton | Jamaica | 45.73 | Q |
| 11 | 4 | Roxbert Martin | Jamaica | 45.74 | Q |
| 12 | 4 | Paul McBurney | Northern Ireland | 45.90 | Q |
| 13 | 1 | Davian Clarke | Jamaica | 45.96 | Q |
| 14 | 1 | Mark Hylton | England | 45.97 | Q |
| 14 | 2 | Jeffrey Masvanhise | Zimbabwe | 45.97 | Q |
| 16 | 3 | Casey Vincent | Australia | 46.03 | |
| 17 | 4 | Solomon Wariso | England | 46.11 | Q |
| 18 | 1 | Shane Niemi | Canada | 46.17 | |
| 19 | 3 | Adriaan Botha | South Africa | 46.30 | |
| 20 | 4 | Soloveni Nakaunicina | Fiji | 46.35 | |
| 21 | 2 | Declan Stack | Australia | 46.63 | |
| 22 | 1 | Lulu Basinyi | Botswana | 46.71 | |
| 23 | 4 | Evripides Demosthenous | Cyprus | 46.89 | |
| 24 | 2 | Romzi Bakar | Malaysia | 47.12 | |
| 25 | 1 | Hendrick Mokganyetsi | South Africa | 47.23 | |
| 26 | 2 | Johnson Kubisa | Botswana | 47.34 | |
| 27 | 3 | Brian Forbes | Northern Ireland | 47.41 | |
| 28 | 1 | Fernando Augustin | Mauritius | 47.66 | |
| 29 | 3 | Henry Semiti | Fiji | 47.66 | |
| 30 | 4 | Nadarajan Deverajo | Malaysia | 48.77 | |
| | 4 | Tawanda Chiwira | Zimbabwe | DNF | |
| | 2 | Donald Bruno | Canada | DNS | |

=== Semifinals ===
Qualification: First 4 of each heat qualified directly (Q) for the final.

| Rank | Heat | Name | Nationality | Time | Notes |
|---|---|---|---|---|---|
| 1 | 2 | Iwan Thomas | Wales | 44.61 | Q |
| 2 | 2 | Jamie Baulch | Wales | 44.83 | Q, SB |
| 3 | 2 | Arnaud Malherbe | South Africa | 45.01 | Q |
| 4 | 1 | Mark Richardson | England | 45.03 | Q |
| 5 | 1 | Sugath Thilakaratne | Sri Lanka | 45.09 | Q |
| 6 | 2 | Davian Clarke | Jamaica | 45.10 | Q |
| 7 | 2 | Roxbert Martin | Jamaica | 45.13 | |
| 8 | 2 | Troy McIntosh | Bahamas | 45.19 | SB |
| 9 | 1 | Greg Haughton | Jamaica | 45.48 | Q |
| 10 | 1 | Kennedy Ochieng | Kenya | 45.48 | Q |
| 11 | 1 | Mark Hylton | England | 45.54 | |
| 12 | 2 | Abednego Matilu | Kenya | 46.06 | |
| 13 | 1 | Patrick Dwyer | Australia | 46.12 | |
| 14 | 1 | Paul McBurney | Northern Ireland | 46.50 | |
| 15 | 1 | Jeffrey Masvanhise | Zimbabwe | 46.77 | |
| 16 | 2 | Solomon Wariso | England | 47.80 | |

=== Final ===
| Rank | Lane | Name | Nationality | Time | Notes |
|---|---|---|---|---|---|
| 1st place, gold medalist(s) | 3 | Iwan Thomas | Wales | 44.52 | GR |
| 2nd place, silver medalist(s) | 6 | Mark Richardson | England | 44.60 | SB |
| 3rd place, bronze medalist(s) | 5 | Sugath Thilakaratne | Sri Lanka | 44.64 | SB |
| 4 | 4 | Jamie Baulch | Wales | 45.30 | |
| 5 | 1 | Arnaud Malherbe | South Africa | 45.45 | |
| 6 | 8 | Greg Haughton | Jamaica | 45.49 | |
| 7 | 7 | Davian Clarke | Jamaica | 45.55 | |
| 8 | 2 | Kennedy Ochieng | Kenya | 45.56 | |
