= 1998 European Athletics Championships – Men's 4 × 400 metres relay =

Men's 4 × 400 metres relay at the European Athletics Championships

The men's 4 × 400 metres relay at the 1998 European Athletics Championships was held at the Népstadion on 22 and 23 August.

== Medalists ==
Gold	Mark Hylton; Jamie Baulch; Iwan Thomas; Mark Richardson; Great Britain
Silver	Piotr Rysiukiewicz; Tomasz Czubak; Piotr Haczek; Robert Maćkowiak; Poland
Bronze	Antonio Andrés; Juan Vicente Trull; Andrés Martínez; David Canal; Spain

== Results ==
KEY:	q	Fastest non-qualifiers	Q	Qualified	NR	National record	PB	Personal best	SB	Seasonal best

=== Heats ===
Qualification: First 3 in each heat (Q) and the next 2 fastest (q) advance to the Final.

Rank	Heat	Nation	Athlete	Time	Notes
1	2	Great Britain	Mark Hylton, Sean Baldock, Solomon Wariso, Jamie Baulch	3:02.37	Q
2	1	Poland	Piotr Długosielski, Jacek Bocian, Piotr Rysiukiewicz, Piotr Haczek	3:03.59	Q
3	2	Italy	Walter Pirovano, Marco Vaccari, Andrea Nuti, Ashraf Saber	3:04.64	Q
4	2	Germany	Stefan Letzelter, Klaus Ehrnsperger, Thomas Goller, Jens Dautzenberg	3:04.84	Q
5	1	Switzerland	Laurent Clerc, Kevin Widmer, Alain Rohr, Mathias Rusterholz	3:05.11	Q, SB
6	2	Spain	Juan Vicente Trull, Antonio Andrés, Andrés Martínez, David Canal	3:05.63	q, SB
7	2	Czech Republic	Jan Poděbradský, Jan Štejfa, Karel Bláha, Jiří Mužík	3:05.88	q
8	1	France	Pierre-Marie Hilaire, Fred Mango, Marc Raquil, Marc Foucan	3:06.09	Q
9	2	Greece	Stelios Dimotsios, Panagiotis Sarris, Periklis Iakovakis, Konstantinos Kenteris	3:06.48	SB
10	1	Slovenia	Matija Šestak, Miro Kocuvan, Damjan Zlatnar, Boštjan Horvat	3:07.78	SB
	1	Russia	Innokentiy Zharov, Boris Gorban, Vladislav Shiryayev, Dmitriy Golovastov	DNF	
	1	Hungary	Zsolt Szeglet, Péter Nyilasi, Zétény Dombi, Tibor Bédi	DNF	

=== Final ===
Rank	Nation	Athletes	Time	Notes
1st place, gold medalist(s)	Great Britain	Mark Hylton, Jamie Baulch, Iwan Thomas, Mark Richardson	2:58.68	SB
2nd place, silver medalist(s)	Poland	Piotr Rysiukiewicz, Tomasz Czubak, Piotr Haczek, Robert Maćkowiak	2:58.88	
3rd place, bronze medalist(s)	Spain	Antonio Andrés, Juan Vicente Trull, Andrés Martínez, David Canal	3:02.47	NR
4	Italy	Walter Pirovano, Marco Vaccari, Andrea Nuti, Ashraf Saber	3:02.48	SB
5	Switzerland	Laurent Clerc, Kevin Widmer, Alain Rohr, Mathias Rusterholz	3:02.91	NR
6	Germany	Stefan Letzelter, Klaus Ehrnsperger, Thomas Goller, Jens Dautzenberg	3:03.19	SB
7	Czech Republic	Jan Poděbradský, Jan Štejfa, Karel Bláha, Jiří Mužík	3:04.37	SB
	France	Pierre-Marie Hilaire, Fred Mango, Marc Raquil, Marc Foucan	DQ	
