= 2000 European Cup (athletics) =

- Dates: 15–16 July (Super Leagues); 8–9 July (First & Second Leagues)
- Host city: Gateshead, United Kingdom
- Venue: Gateshead International Stadium
- Level: Senior
- Type: Outdoor
- Events: 39

The 2000 European Cup was the 21st edition of the European Cup of athletics.

The Super League Finals were held in Gateshead, Great Britain.

== Super League ==
Held on 15 and 16 July in Gateshead, United Kingdom

=== Team standings ===
Men
Pos.	Nation	Points
1	Great Britain	101.5
2	Germany	101
3	France	97
4	Italy	96.5
5	Russia	88.5
6	Greece	88.5
7	Sweden	75
8	Hungary	62

Women
Pos.	Nation	Points
1	Russia	124
2	Germany	111
3	France	87
4	Italy	79
5	Great Britain	78
6	Romania	72
7	Ukraine	71
8	Greece	56

=== Results summary ===
==== Men's events ====
Event	Gold		Silver		Bronze	
100 m (Wind: +2.3 m/s)	Darren Campbell; Great Britain	10.09w	Roland Németh; Hungary	10.19w	Andrea Colombo; Italy	10.23w
200 m (Wind: 0.0 m/s)	Christian Malcolm; Great Britain	20.45	Alessandro Cavallaro; Italy	20.48	Konstantinos Kenteris; Greece	20.48
400 m	Jamie Baulch; Great Britain	46.64	Alessandro Attene; Italy	46.71	Jimisola Laursen; Sweden	46.93
800 m	Mehdi Baala; France	1:47.90	Nils Schumann; Germany	1:47.94	Balázs Korányi; Hungary	1:48.52
1500 m	Mehdi Baala; France	3:41.75	John Mayock; Great Britain	3:42.32	Vyacheslav Shabunin; Russia	3:42.44
3000 m	Driss Maazouzi; France	7:58.7	Vyacheslav Shabunin; Russia	7:59.0	Anthony Whiteman; Great Britain	8:01.0
5000 m	Mustapha Essaïd; France	13:47.44	Dmitriy Maksimov; Russia	13:48.43	Sebastian Hallmann; Germany	13:49.95
3000 m steeplechase	Bouabdellah Tahri; France	8:27.28	Damian Kallabis; Germany	8:29.16	Giuseppe Maffei; Italy	8:34.47
110 m hurdles (Wind: +1.4 m/s)	Falk Balzer; Germany	13.52	Emiliano Pizzoli; Italy	13.54	Robert Kronberg; Sweden	13.67
400 m hurdles	Chris Rawlinson; Great Britain	48.84	Ruslan Mashchenko; Russia	49.19	Fabrizio Mori; Italy	49.98
4 × 100 m	Great Britain; Christian Malcolm; Darren Campbell; Marlon Devonish; Dwain Chambers	38.41	Greece; Yeóryios Theodorídis; Konstadínos Kedéris; Alexiós Alexópoulos; Ággelos Pavlakákis	38.67	Italy; Marco Torrieri; Maurizio Checcucci; Alessandro Cavallaro; Andrea Colombo	39.17
4 × 400 m	France; Bruno Wavelet; Marc Foucan; Dimitri Demonière; Marc Raquil	3:04.50	Great Britain; Richard Knowles; Sean Baldock; Chris Rawlinson; Jamie Baulch	3:05.24	Hungary; Zétény Dombi; Zsolt Szeglet; Attila Kilvinger; Tibor Bédi	3:05.88
High jump	Stefan Holm; Sweden	2.28	Wolfgang Kreissig; Germany	2.25	Sergey Klyugin; Russia Lambros Papakostas; Greece	2.20
Pole vault	Yevgeniy Smiryagin; Russia	5.85	Tim Lobinger; Germany	5.75	Patrik Kristiansson; Sweden	5.70
Long jump	Vitaliy Shkurlatov; Russia	8.22	Kofi Amoah Prah; Germany	8.15w	Peter Häggström; Sweden	8.08w
Triple jump	Larry Achike; Great Britain	17.31w	Fabrizio Donato; Italy	17.17w	Stamatios Lenis; Greece	17.01
Shot put	Paolo Dal Soglio; Italy	19.99	Michael Mertens; Germany	19.71	Jimmy Nordin; Sweden	19.46
Discus throw	Lars Riedel; Germany	63.30	Róbert Fazekas; Hungary	62.15	Vitaliy Sidorov; Russia	60.91
Hammer throw	Christophe Épalle; France	78.51	Alexandros Papadimitriou; Greece	77.64	Karsten Kobs; Germany	77.55
Javelin throw	Sergey Makarov; Russia	89.92	Kostas Gatsioudis; Greece	84.56	Boris Henry; Germany	82.83
WR world record | AR area record | CR championship record | GR games record | NR national record | OR Olympic record | PB personal best | SB season best | WL world leading (in a given season)

==== Women's events ====
Event	Gold		Silver		Bronze	
100 m (Wind: +2.9 m/s)	Ekaterini Thanou; Greece	10.84w	Christine Arron; France	11.02w	Manuela Levorato; Italy	11.13w
200 m (Wind: -0.3 m/s)	Muriel Hurtis; France	22.70	Natalya Voronova; Russia	22.81	Andrea Philipp; Germany	22.88
400 m	Svetlana Pospelova; Russia	50.63	Donna Fraser; Great Britain	51.78	Uta Rohländer; Germany	52.17
800 m	Irina Mistyukevich; Russia	2:02.52	Linda Kisabaka; Germany	2:03.88	Patricia Djaté; France	2:04.44
1500 m	Helen Pattinson; Great Britain	4:12.05	Yelena Zadorozhnaya; Russia	4:12.20	Kristina da Fonseca-Wollheim; Germany	4:13.11
3000 m	Gabriela Szabo; Romania	8:43.33	Galina Bogomolova; Russia	8:43.45	Hayley Tullett; Great Britain	8:45.39
5000 m	Tatyana Tomashova; Russia	14:53.00	Irina Mikitenko; Germany	14:54.30	Yamna Belkacem; France	14:57.05
100 m hurdles (Wind: +0.2 m/s)	Linda Ferga; France	12.93	Maya Shemchishina; Ukraine	12.95	Yuliya Graudyn; Russia	13.08
400 m hurdles	Tatyana Tereshchuk; Ukraine	54.68	Ulrike Urbansky; Germany	56.10	Monika Niederstätter; Italy	56.33
4 × 100 m	France; Katia Benth; Muriel Hurtis; Fabé Dia; Christine Arron	42.97	Russia; Marina Kislova; Marina Trandenkova; Irina Khabarova; Natalya Voronova	43.38	Germany; Sina Schielke; Esther Möller; Andrea Philipp; Marion Wagner	43.51
4 × 400 m	Russia; Olesya Zykina; Irina Rosikhina; Yekaterina Kulikova; Yuliya Sotnikova	3:25.50	Germany; Shanta Ghosh; Ulrike Urbansky; Birgit Rockmeier; Uta Rohländer	3:27.70	Great Britain; Natasha Danvers; Sinead Dudgeon; Allison Curbishley; Donna Fraser	3:28.12
High jump	Monica Dinescu; Romania	1.93	Yuliya Lyakhova; Russia	1.91	Jo Jennings-Steele; Great Britain	1.86
Pole vault	Svetlana Feofanova; Russia	4.35	Yvonne Buschbaum; Germany	4.30	Francesca Dolcini; Italy	4.20
Long jump	Olga Rublyova; Russia	6.87	Yelena Shekhovtsova; Ukraine	6.79	Fiona May; Italy	6.74w
Triple jump	Tatyana Lebedeva; Russia	14.98	Yelena Govorova; Ukraine	14.31	Barbara Lah; Italy	13.86
Shot put	Astrid Kumbernuss; Germany	18.94	Kalliopi Ouzouni; Greece	18.16	Judy Oakes; Great Britain	18.08
Discus	Nicoleta Grasu; Romania	63.35	Ilke Wyludda; Germany	62.45	Anastasia Kelesidou; Greece	62.30
Hammer	Olga Kuzenkova; Russia	70.20	Kirsten Münchow; Germany	68.31	Manuela Montebrun; France	67.73
Javelin	Ana Mirela Termure; Romania	63.23	Tatyana Shikolenko; Russia	60.41	Mirela Tzelili; Greece	57.84
WR world record | AR area record | CR championship record | GR games record | NR national record | OR Olympic record | PB personal best | SB season best | WL world leading (in a given season)

== First League ==
The First League was held on 8 and 9 June

=== Men ===
Group A
Held in Oslo, Norway

Pos.	Nation	Points
1	Spain	116
2	Finland	101
3	Norway	98
4	Czech Republic	93
5	Portugal	87
6	Switzerland	85
7	Belgium	82
8	Denmark	54

Group B
Held in Bydgoszcz, Poland

Pos.	Nation	Points
1	Poland	134
2	Ukraine	111
3	Netherlands	108
4	Bulgaria	86
5	Slovenia	78.5
6	Romania	77.5
7	Austria	63
8	Croatia	59

=== Women ===
Group A
Held in Oslo, Norway

Pos.	Nation	Points
1	Czech Republic	108
2	Sweden	106
3	Spain	96
4	Finland	89
5	Hungary	83
6	Portugal	72
7	Norway	71
8	Switzerland	59

Group B
Held in Bydgoszcz, Poland

Pos.	Nation	Points
1	Belarus	118
2	Bulgaria	116
3	Poland	103
4	Slovenia	94
5	Netherlands	71
6	Austria	69
7	Ireland	63
8	Croatia	44

== Second League ==
The Second League was held on 8 and 9 June

=== Men ===
Group A
Held in Kaunas, Lithuania

Pos.	Nation	Points
1	Belarus	132
2	Ireland	125
3	Lithuania	108
4	Estonia	100
5	Latvia	94
6	Moldova	74
7	Luxembourg	43
8	Armenia	37

Group B
Held in Banská Bystrica, Slovakia

Pos.	Nation	Points
1	Slovakia	140
2	Yugoslavia	136
3	Turkey	132
4	Cyprus	127
5	Israel	116.5
6	Iceland	70
7	AASSE	69
8	Bosnia and Herzegovina	53
9	Georgia	50.5

=== Women ===
Group A
Held in Kaunas, Lithuania

Pos.	Nation	Points
1	Lithuania	129
2	Belgium	115
3	Denmark	106
4	Estonia	100
5	Latvia	94
6	Moldova	64
7	Luxembourg	41
8	Armenia	28

Group B
Held in Banská Bystrica, Slovakia

Pos.	Nation	Points
1	Turkey	149.5
2	Yugoslavia	136
3	Slovakia	120
4	Israel	116
5	Iceland	85
6	Cyprus	83
7	Albania	64.5
8	Georgia	42
9	AASSE	37
