= 1998 European Athletics Indoor Championships – Men's 400 metres =

The men's 400 metres event at the 1998 European Athletics Indoor Championships was held on 27 February–1 March.

== Medalists ==
Gold	Silver	Bronze
Ruslan Mashchenko; Russia	Ashraf Saber; Italy	Robert Maćkowiak; Poland

== Results ==
=== Heats ===
First 2 from each heat (Q) and the next 2 fastest (q) qualified for the semifinals.

Rank	Heat	Name	Nationality	Time	Notes
1	3	Ashraf Saber	Italy	47.16	Q
2	5	Ruslan Mashchenko	Russia	47.19	Q
3	1	Sean Baldock	Great Britain	47.26	Q
4	3	Jan Poděbradský	Czech Republic	47.38	Q
5	5	Robert Maćkowiak	Poland	47.43	Q
6	3	Bruno Wavelet	France	47.49	q
7	1	Rafik Elouardi	Austria	47.51	Q
8	5	Antonio Andrés	Spain	47.52	q
9	3	Paul Slythe	Great Britain	47.62	
10	1	Fred Mango	France	47.67	
11	4	Emmanuel Front	France	47.68	Q
12	2	Carlos Silva	Portugal	47.75	Q
12	4	Andreas Rechbauer	Austria	47.75	Q
14	2	Tomasz Czubak	Poland	47.85	Q
15	4	Laurent Clerc	Switzerland	47.89	
16	3	Periklis Iakovakis	Greece	47.99	
17	1	Boris Gorban	Russia	48.11	
18	5	Alex Argudin	Romania	48.15	
19	1	Evripides Demosthenous	Cyprus	48.16	
20	4	Panayiotis Sarris	Greece	48.23	
21	2	Solomon Wariso	Great Britain	48.41	
22	2	Bjorn Verbeke	Belgium	48.78	
23	2	Pablo Escribá	Spain	48.81	
24	4	Ercan Sunu	Turkey	48.82	
25	5	Kjell Provost	Belgium	49.05	

=== Semifinals ===
First 3 from each semifinal qualified directly (Q) for the final.

Rank	Heat	Name	Nationality	Time	Notes
1	1	Ruslan Mashchenko	Russia	46.24	Q
2	1	Robert Maćkowiak	Poland	46.36	Q
3	2	Ashraf Saber	Italy	46.48	Q
4	1	Sean Baldock	Great Britain	46.59	Q
5	1	Bruno Wavelet	France	46.79	
6	2	Carlos Silva	Portugal	47.42	Q
7	2	Tomasz Czubak	Poland	47.43	Q
8	2	Emmanuel Front	France	47.61	
9	2	Rafik Elouardi	Austria	47.64	
10	2	Antonio Andrés	Spain	47.66	
11	1	Andreas Rechbauer	Austria	48.03	
	1	Jan Poděbradský	Czech Republic	DQ	

=== Final ===
Rank	Name	Nationality	Time	Notes
1st place, gold medalist(s)	Ruslan Mashchenko	Russia	45.90	NR
2nd place, silver medalist(s)	Ashraf Saber	Italy	45.99	NR
3rd place, bronze medalist(s)	Robert Maćkowiak	Poland	46.00	
4	Tomasz Czubak	Poland	47.18	
5	Carlos Silva	Portugal	47.32	
6	Sean Baldock	Great Britain	50.05	
