= 2000 European Athletics Indoor Championships – Men's 4 × 400 metres relay =

The men's 4 × 400 metres relay event at the 2000 European Athletics Indoor Championships was held on February 27.

== Results ==
Rank	Nation	Competitors	Time	Notes
1st place, gold medalist(s)	Czech Republic	Jiří Mužík, Jan Poděbradský, Štěpán Tesařík, Karel Bláha	3:06.10	NR
2nd place, silver medalist(s)	Germany	Ingo Schultz, Ruwen Faller, Marco Krause, Lars Figura	3:06.64	
3rd place, bronze medalist(s)	Hungary	Péter Nyilasi, Attila Kilvinger, Zétény Dombi, Tibor Bedi	3:09.35	NR
4	Great Britain	Ed White, Paul Slythe, David Naismith, Richard Knowles	3:09.79	
	Russia	Andrey Semyonov, Dmitriy Golovastov, Oleg Kovalev, Boris Gorban	DQ	
	France	Pierre-Marie Hilaire, Philippe Bouche, Bruno Wavelet, Marc Raquil	DNF	
