= Casey Vincent (athlete) =

Australian sprinter

Casey Garnett Vincent (born 17 March 1979 in Boronia, Victoria) is a retired Australian sprinter who specialised in the 400 metres. He represented his country at two Olympic Games, in 2000 and 2004, reaching the semifinals on the first occasion.

== Competition record ==
Year	Competition	Venue	Position	Event	Notes
Representing Australia
1996	World Junior Championships	Sydney, Australia	21st (sf)	400 m	48.16
1996	World Junior Championships	Sydney, Australia	5th	4 × 400 m relay	3:07.21
1998	World Junior Championships	Annecy, France	2nd	400 m	45.55
1998	World Junior Championships	Annecy, France	1st	4 × 400 m relay	3:04.74
1998	Commonwealth Games	Kuala Lumpur, Malaysia	(qf)	400 m	46.03
1998	Commonwealth Games	Kuala Lumpur, Malaysia	5th	4 × 400 m relay	3:02.96
1999	World Indoor Championships	Maebashi, Japan	17th (sf)	400 m	48.03
2000	Olympic Games	Sydney, Australia	11th (sf)	400 m	45.61
2000	Olympic Games	Sydney, Australia	9th (sf)	4 × 400 m relay	3:01.91
2004	World Indoor Championships	Budapest, Hungary	12th (sf)	400 m	47.68
2004	Olympic Games	Athens, Greece	30th (h)	400 m	46.09

== Personal bests ==
Outdoor

- 200 metres – 21.14 (+1.2 m/s) (Darwin 2000)
- 400 metres – 45.30 (Melbourne 2004)

Indoor

- 400 metres – 47.15 (Maebashi 1999)
