= Blair Young =

Australian hurdler (born 1971)

Blair Young (born 5 April 1971 in Brisbane) is a retired Australian athlete specialising in the 400 metres hurdles. He represented his country at the 2000 Summer Olympics and the 2001 World Championships reaching the semifinals on both occasions.

His personal bests are 49.08 seconds in the 400 metres hurdles and 45.94 seconds in the flat 400 metres, both set in 2000.

== Competition record ==
Year	Competition	Venue	Position	Event	Notes
Representing Australia
2000	Olympic Games	Sydney, Australia	11th (sf)	400 m hurdles	49.20
2000	Olympic Games	Sydney, Australia	7th	4 × 400 m relay	3:03.91
2001	World Championships	Edmonton, Canada	22nd (sf)	400 m hurdles	50.21
2001	Goodwill Games	Brisbane, Australia	7th	400 m hurdles	50.79
2001	Goodwill Games	Brisbane, Australia	4th	4 × 400 m relay	3:05.20
