= Ahmed Al-Imam =

Qatari sprinter

Personal information
- Nationality: Qatari
- Born: 1 January 1982 (age 44)

Sport
- Sport: Sprinting
- Event: 4 × 400 metres relay

Ahmed Al-Imam (born 1 January 1982) is a Qatari sprinter. He competed in the men's 4 × 400 metres relay at the 2000 Summer Olympics.
