= Andrés Martinez (athlete) =

Spanish sprinter

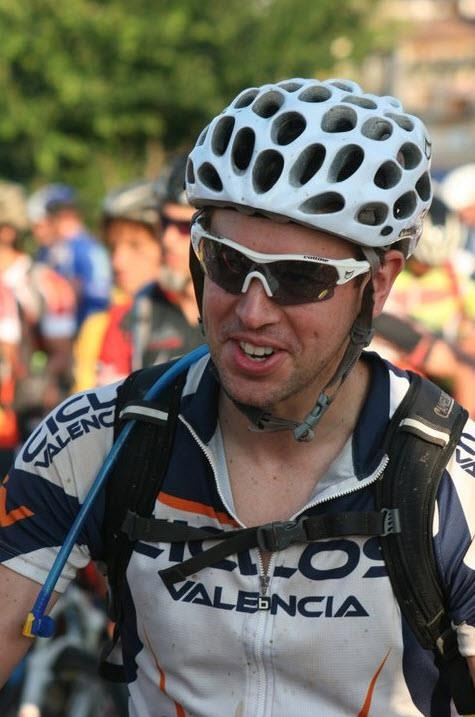
- Andreu.

Medal record

Men's athletics

Representing Spain

European Championships
Bronze medal – third place	1998 Budapest	4×400 m

Andrés Martínez Ferrandis (10 June 1978 – 25 June 2015) was a Spanish sprinter and European medalist. Martinez won the bronze medal, running the third leg, at the 1998 European Athletics Championships – Men's 4 × 400 metres relay.
