= Youssoupha Sarr =

Senegalese sprinter

Personal information
- Nationality: Senegalese
- Born: 16 October 1978
- Died: May 2002

Sport
- Sport: Sprinting
- Event: 4 × 400 metres relay
Medal record
Men's athletics
Representing Senegal
African Championships
| Bronze medal – third place | 2000 Algiers | 4×400 m |

Youssoupha Sarr (16 October 1978 – May 2002) was a Senegalese sprinter. He competed in the men's 4 × 400 metres relay at the 2000 Summer Olympics.
