= Antonio Andrés =

Spanish sprinter

Personal information
- Born: 18 January 1974 (age 52) Gandia, Spain
- Height: 1.80 m (5 ft 11 in)
- Weight: 86 kg (190 lb)

Sport
- Sport: Track and field
- Event: 400 metres
- Club: CA Valencia Terra i Mar
Medal record
Men's athletics
Representing Spain
European Championships
Bronze medal – third place	1998 Budapest	4×400 m

José Antonio Andrés Guillén (born 18 January 1974 in Gandia) is a retired Spanish sprinter who specialised in the 400 metres. He represented his country at the 2000 Summer Olympics, as well as three outdoor and one indoor World Championships. He won the bronze medal with the Spanish 4 × 400 metres relay at the 1998 European Championships.

His personal bests in the event are 46.23 seconds outdoors (Monachil 1999) and 47.14 seconds indoors (Paris 1997).

== Competition record ==
Year	Competition	Venue	Position	Event	Notes
Representing Spain
1993	European Junior Championships	San Sebastián, Spain	14th (h)	400 m	48.78
1993	European Junior Championships	San Sebastián, Spain	9th (h)	4 × 400 m relay	3:13.46
1997	World Indoor Championships	Paris, France	17th (h)	400 m	47.71
1997	Mediterranean Games	Bari, Italy	8th	400 m	46.97
1997	Mediterranean Games	Bari, Italy	4th	4 × 400 m relay	3:04.73
1997	World Championships	Athens, Greece	36th (h)	400 m	46.94
1997	World Championships	Athens, Greece	15th (h)	4 × 400 m relay	3:05.34
1998	European Indoor Championships	Valencia, Spain	10th (sf)	400 m	47.66
1998	Ibero-American Championships	Lisbon, Portugal	4th	400 m	46.40
1998	Ibero-American Championships	Lisbon, Portugal	2nd	4 × 400 m relay	3:08.05
1998	European Championships	Budapest, Hungary	16th (sf)	400 m	46.59
1998	European Championships	Budapest, Hungary	3rd	4 × 400 m relay	3:02.47
1999	World Indoor Championships	Maebashi, Japan	8th (h)	4 × 400 m relay	3:15.94
1999	World Championships	Seville, Spain	14th (h)	4 × 400 m relay	3:02.85
2000	Olympic Games	Sydney, Australia	20th (h)	4 × 400 m relay	3:06.87
2001	World Championships	Edmonton, Canada	6th	4 × 400 m relay	3:02.24
