= Roman Voronko =

Ukrainian sprinter

Personal information
- Nationality: Ukrainian
- Born: 1 April 1978 (age 48)

Sport
- Sport: Sprinting
- Event: 4 × 400 metres relay

Roman Voronko (born 1 April 1978) is a Ukrainian sprinter. He competed in the men's 4 × 400 metres relay at the 2000 Summer Olympics.
