= 2004 IAAF World Indoor Championships – Men's 400 metres =

The men's 400 metres event at the 2004 IAAF World Indoor Championships was held on March 5–6.

== Medalists ==
Gold	Silver	Bronze
Alleyne Francique; Grenada	Davian Clarke; Jamaica	Gary Kikaya; Democratic Republic of the Congo

== Results ==
=== Heat ===
First 2 of each heat (Q) and next 2 fastest (q) qualified for the semifinals.

Rank	Heat	Name	Nationality	Time	Notes
1	4	Davian Clarke	Jamaica	46.36	Q
2	4	David Canal	Spain	46.67	Q
3	5	Alleyne Francique	Grenada	46.76	Q
4	4	Zsolt Szeglet	Hungary	46.92	q
5	4	David McCarthy	Ireland	46.94	q
6	2	Sofiane Labidi	Tunisia	46.97	Q
DQ	2	Ioan Lucian Vieru	Romania	~~47.07~~	Doping
7	2	Chris Brown	Bahamas	47.08	Q
8	5	Gary Kikaya	Democratic Republic of the Congo	47.09	Q
9	3	Joe Mendel	United States	47.33	Q
10	1	Milton Campbell	United States	47.35	Q
11	3	Casey Vincent	Australia	47.42	Q
11	5	Robert Daly	Ireland	47.42	
13	2	Salvador Rodríguez	Spain	47.53	
14	3	California Molefe	Botswana	47.58	
15	3	Ato Stephens	Trinidad and Tobago	47.62	
16	1	Gregory Haughton	Jamaica	47.71	Q
17	3	Chris Lloyd	Dominica	47.78	SB
18	1	Lloyd Zvasiya	Zimbabwe	47.81	SB
19	1	Adam Potter	Great Britain	47.82	
20	5	Nagmeldin Ali Abubakr	Sudan	47.85	
21	4	Ernie Candelario	Philippines	48.92	SB
22	4	Geoffrey Bai	Papua New Guinea	50.57	SB
23	1	Cheong Man Fong	Macau	55.17	SB
	1	Matija Šestak	Slovenia	DNS	
	2	Daryl Vassallo	Gibraltar	DNS	
	5	Marcelo Figueroa	El Salvador	DNS	

=== Semifinals ===
First 3 of each semifinal (Q) qualified for the final.

Rank	Heat	Name	Nationality	Time	Notes
1	2	Alleyne Francique	Grenada	46.32	Q
2	1	Davian Clarke	Jamaica	46.34	Q
3	1	Gary Kikaya	Democratic Republic of the Congo	46.46	Q, SB
4	1	Joe Mendel	United States	46.56	Q
5	2	Sofiane Labidi	Tunisia	46.61	Q
6	2	Milton Campbell	United States	46.67	Q
7	2	Chris Brown	Bahamas	46.68	
8	1	David Canal	Spain	46.70	
9	2	Gregory Haughton	Jamaica	46.81	
10	2	Zsolt Szeglet	Hungary	47.16	
11	1	David McCarthy	Ireland	47.34	
12	1	Casey Vincent	Australia	47.68	

=== Final ===
Rank	Name	Nationality	Time	Notes
1st place, gold medalist(s)	Alleyne Francique	Grenada	45.88	SB
2nd place, silver medalist(s)	Davian Clarke	Jamaica	45.92	SB
3rd place, bronze medalist(s)	Gary Kikaya	Democratic Republic of the Congo	46.30	SB
4	Sofiane Labidi	Tunisia	46.48	
5	Milton Campbell	United States	46.74	
6	Joe Mendel	United States	47.34	
