= Ratna Kumar =

Sri Lankan sprinter

Personal information
- Full name: Vellasamy Ratnakumara
- Nationality: Sri Lankan
- Born: 2 February 1975 (age 51)

Sport
- Sport: Sprinting
- Event: 4 × 400 metres relay

Ratna Kumar (born 2 February 1975) is a Sri Lankan sprinter. He competed in the men's 4 × 400 metres relay at the 2000 Summer Olympics.
