= Jože Vrtačič =

Slovenian sprinter

Personal information
- Nationality: Slovenian
- Born: 1 February 1980 (age 46)

Sport
- Sport: Sprinting
- Event: 4 × 400 metres relay

Jože Vrtačič (born 1 February 1980) is a Slovenian sprinter. He competed in the men's 4 × 400 metres relay at the 2000 Summer Olympics.
