= Sergej Šalamon =

Slovenian sprinter

Personal information
- Nationality: Slovenian
- Born: 7 March 1975 (age 51) Velenje, Yugoslavia

Sport
- Sport: Sprinting
- Event: 4 × 400 metres relay

Sergej Šalamon (born 7 March 1975) is a Slovenian sprinter. He competed in the men's 4 × 400 metres relay at the 2000 Summer Olympics.
