= Branislav Stojanović =

Serbian sprinter

Personal information
- Nationality: Serbian
- Born: 9 September 1973 (age 52) Kikinda
- Height: 188 cm (6 ft 2 in)
- Weight: 75 kg (165 lb)

Sport
- Sport: Sprinting
- Event: 4 × 400 metres relay
- Club: Atletski klub Partizan

Branislav Stojanović (born 9 September 1973) is a Serbian sprinter. He competed in the men's 4 × 400 metres relay at the 2000 Summer Olympics, representing Yugoslavia.
