= Elvis Peršić =

Croatian sprinter

Personal information
- Born: 16 August 1976 (age 49) Pula, Croatia
- Height: 180 cm (5 ft 11 in)
- Weight: 72 kg (159 lb)

Sport
- Country: Croatia
- Sport: Sprinting
- Event: 4 × 400 metres relay

Elvis Peršić (born 16 August 1976) is a Croatian sprinter. He competed in the men's 4 × 400 metres relay at the 2000 Summer Olympics.
