= Slaviša Vraneš =

Serbian sprinter

Personal information
- Nationality: Serbian
- Born: 20 March 1977 (age 49)

Sport
- Sport: Sprinting
- Event: 4 × 400 metres relay

Slaviša Vraneš (born 20 March 1977) is a Serbian sprinter. He competed in the men's 4 × 400 metres relay at the 2000 Summer Olympics, representing Yugoslavia.
