= 2002 African Championships in Athletics – Men's 4 × 400 metres relay =

The men's 4 × 400 metres relay event at the 2002 African Championships in Athletics was held in Radès, Tunisia on August 10.

== Results ==
Rank	Nation	Competitors	Time	Notes
1st place, gold medalist(s)	Morocco	Abdellatif El Ghazaoui, Nabil Jabir, Ismael Daif, Abdelkrim Khoudri	3:09.72	
2nd place, silver medalist(s)	Mauritius	Jean-François Degrâce, Fernando Augustin, Kursley Montimerdo, Eric Milazar	3:10.14	
3rd place, bronze medalist(s)	Senegal	Ousmane Niang, Seydina Doucouré, Jacques Sambou, Oumar Loum	3:14.40	
4	Libya	Abubaker El Gatroni, Zuheir El-Menghawi, Hafed Khamis, Fadhil Boubaker	3:25.63	
	Tunisia	Héni Kechi, Selim Medersi, Laroussi Titi, Sofiane Labidi	DNF	
	Algeria		DNS	
	Liberia		DNS	
