= Aggripa Matshameko =

Botswana sprinter

Personal information
- Nationality: Botswana
- Born: 25 May 1970 (age 56)

Sport
- Sport: Sprinting
- Event: 4 × 400 metres relay

Achievements and titles
- Olympic finals: 1996 Summer Olympics; 2000 Summer Olympics

Aggripa Matshameko (born 25 May 1970) is a Botswana sprinter. He competed in the 4 × 400 metres relay at the 1996 Summer Olympics and the 2000 Summer Olympics, anchoring the first ever Botswanan team to qualify for the semi-finals in 2000.

== Career ==
Matshameko was seeded in the 5th 4 × 400 m heat at the 1996 Olympics. He led off for his team that finished 5th in 3:06.62.

Matshameko left for the 2000 Olympics on 3 September. He ran two individual races in Australia before the Olympics, including a 34.29-second 300 metres and a 6th-place 400 metres finish in Newcastle, New South Wales. Anchoring his team in the 5th Olympic 4 × 400 m heat, they ran 3:04.19 to qualify for the semi-finals on time. It was the first time ever that a Botswanan team had qualified for the semi-finals. Matshameko was replaced by Glody Dube in the next round, and the Botswanan team did not qualify for the finals.

Matshameko was honored at a 2001 ceremony in Botswana following his Olympic performance. He competed at the 2001 Engen Summer Series meet in Roodepoort, South Africa. He joined a training group to prepare for the 2001 World Championships in Athletics, but did not ultimately compete. He set his 400 m personal best of 47.1 seconds that year.

Matshameko competed at the 2002 ABSA Series meet in Port Elizabeth, South Africa. He qualified for the 2002 African Military Games in the 400 m, where he finished 3rd in his semi-final in 47.4 seconds, failing to make the finals by one place.
