= Nicolas Bäriswyl =

Swiss sprinter

Personal information
- Nationality: Swiss
- Born: 10 April 1977 (age 49)

Sport
- Sport: Sprinting
- Event: 4 × 400 metres relay

Nicolas Bäriswyl (born 10 April 1977) is a Swiss sprinter. He competed in the men's 4 × 400 metres relay at the 2000 Summer Olympics.
