= Daniel Adomako =

Ghanaian sprinter

Personal information
- Nationality: Ghanaian
- Born: 24 December 1979 (age 46)

Sport
- Sport: Sprinting
- Event: 4 × 400 metres relay

Daniel Adomako (born 24 December 1979) is a Ghanaian sprinter. He competed in the men's 4 × 400 metres relay at the 2000 Summer Olympics.
