= Ruwen Faller =

German sprinter

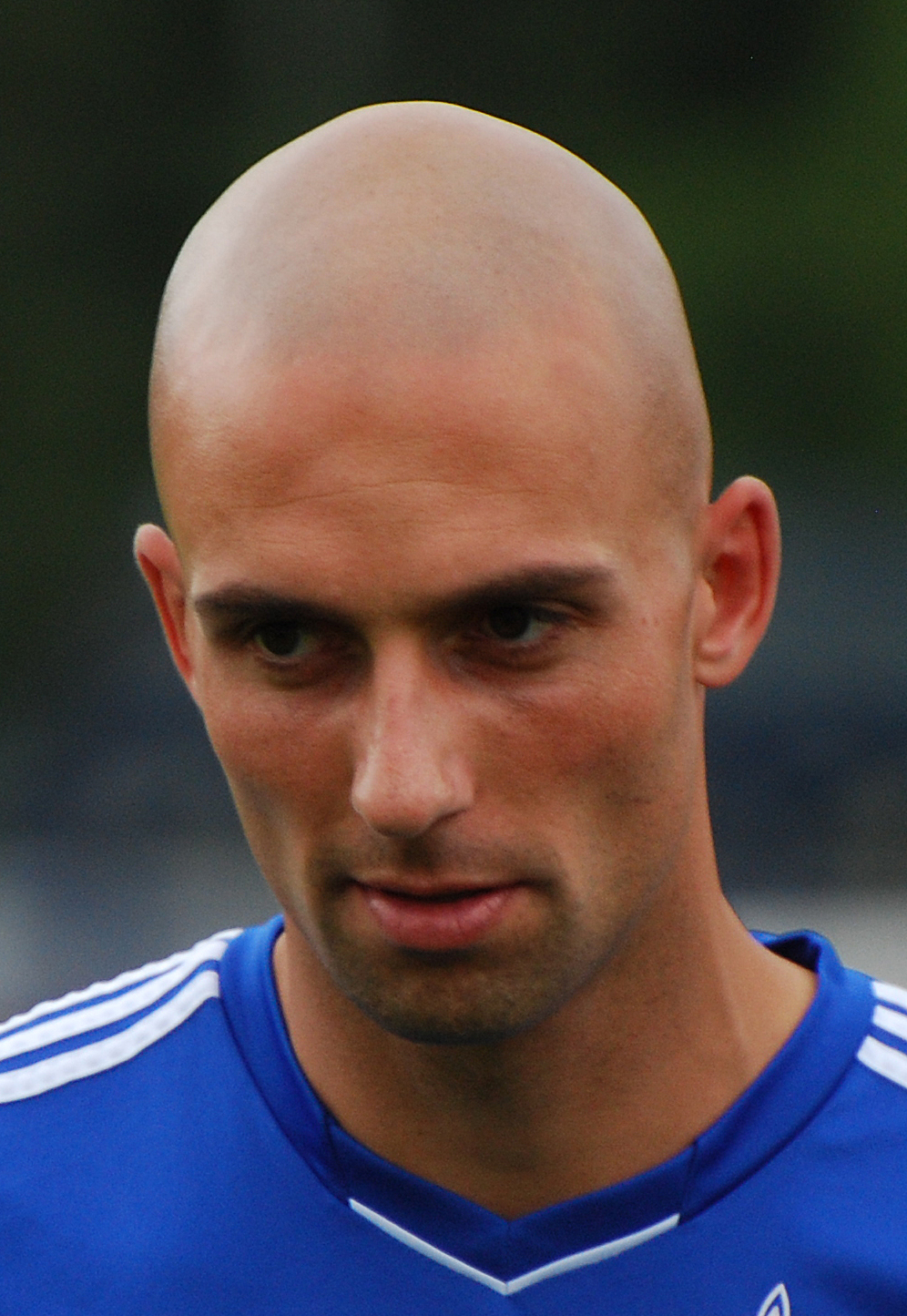

Ruwen Faller (born 22 July 1980 in Rheinfelden) is a German former sprinter who specialized in the 400 metres. After retirement, he began working for German football clubs as an athletic coach. He is currently the athletic coach of Bundesliga club RB Leipzig.

His personal best time is 45.74 seconds, achieved in July 1999 in Erfurt.

== Achievements ==
Year	Competition	Venue	Position	Event	Notes
Representing Germany
1998	World Junior Championships	Annecy, France	12th (sf)	400m	46.96
1998	World Junior Championships	Annecy, France	4th	4 × 400 m relay	3:05.84
1999	European Junior Championships	Riga, Latvia	1st	400 m	46.38
1999	European Junior Championships	Riga, Latvia	1st	4 × 400 m relay	3:07.42
2000	European Indoor Championships	Ghent, Belgium	2nd	4 × 400 m relay	3:06.64
2001	European U23 Championships	Amsterdam, Netherlands	12th (h)	400m	47.28
2001	European U23 Championships	Amsterdam, Netherlands	2nd	4 × 400 m relay	3:05.39
2001	World Championships	Edmonton, Canada	7th	4 × 400 m relay	3:03.52
2002	World Cup	Madrid, Spain	6th	4 × 400 m relay	3:05.31
2004	Olympic Games	Athens, Greece	7th	4 × 400 m relay	3:02.22
2006	European Championships	Gothenburg, Sweden	4th	4 × 400 m relay	3:02.83
