= Emmanuel Front =

French sprinter

Personal information
- Nationality: French
- Born: 27 January 1973 (age 53)

Sport
- Sport: Sprinting
- Event: 4 × 400 metres relay

Emmanuel Front (born 27 January 1973 in Vesoul) is a French sprinter. He competed in the men's 4 × 400 metres relay at the 2000 Summer Olympics.
