= Simon Pierre =

Trinidad and Tobago sprinter

Personal information
- Nationality: Trinidad and Tobago
- Born: 3 December 1979 (age 46)

Sport
- Sport: Sprinting
- Event: 4 × 400 metres relay

Simon Pierre (born 3 December 1979) is a Trinidad and Tobago sprinter. He competed in the men's 4 × 400 metres relay at the 2000 Summer Olympics.
