= Mark Richardson (sprinter) =

British sprinter

Mark Richardson OLY
Personal information
- Nationality: British (English)
- Born: 26 July 1972 (age 54)
- Height: 178 cm (5 ft 10 in)
- Weight: 74 kg (163 lb)

Sport
- Sport: Athletics
- Event: Sprints
- Club: Windsor, Slough & Eton AC
Medal record
Men's Athletics
Representing Great Britain
Olympic Games
Silver medal – second place	1996 Atlanta	4 × 400 m relay
Bronze medal – third place	1992 Barcelona	4 × 400 m relay
World Championships
Gold medal – first place	1997 Athens	4 × 400 m relay
European Championships
Gold medal – first place	1998 Budapest	4 × 400 m relay
Bronze medal – third place	1998 Budapest	400 m
World Junior Championships
Silver medal – second place	1990 Plovdiv	4 × 400 m relay
Bronze medal – third place	1990 Plovdiv	400 m
Representing England
Commonwealth Games
Silver medal – second place	1998 Kuala Lumpur	400 m
Silver medal – second place	1998 Kuala Lumpur	4 × 400 m relay

Mark Ashton Richardson (born 26 July 1972, in Slough) is a retired English sprinter who competed mainly in the 400 metres and 4 × 400 metres relay for Great Britain and England. He won the gold medal in the 4 × 400 metres relay at the 1997 World Championships, and again in the same event at the 1998 European Championships. At the Olympic Games, he won silver and bronze medals in the 1992 and 1996 4 × 400 metres relays. In the individual event, Richardson's most significant international results were silver at the 1998 Commonwealth Games and bronze in the 1998 European Championships, in addition to three domestic championships gold medals between 1995 and 2002.

As of July 2022, Richardson was ranked joint third in the all-time Great Britain lists for 400 metres

== Athletics career ==
Richardson competed for Great Britain in the 1996 Summer Olympics held in Atlanta, United States in the 4 × 400 metre relay where he won the silver medal with his teammates Iwan Thomas, Jamie Baulch and Roger Black. This team set a European record, 2:56.60, in the process.

At the 1997 World Championships in Athens, Richardson ran the anchor leg for Great Britain in the 4 × 400 m relay, winning the silver medal. His unofficial split time was 43.5. On 7 January 2010 it was announced that Great Britain's 1997 World Championship 4 × 400 m relay team are to be awarded the gold medal; they were beaten by a U.S. team that included Antonio Pettigrew, who admitted in 2008 to using performance-enhancing drugs.

He represented England and won double silver in the 400 metres and 4 × 400 metres relay, at the 1998 Commonwealth Games in Kuala Lumpur, Malaysia.

Richardson was a three-time British 400 metres champion after winning the British AAA Championships title in 1995, 2000 and 2001.

== Doping case ==
Richardson received a two-year ban from the IAAF after he failed a drugs test which was taken on 25 October 1999. He was suspended in March 2000 and subsequently missed the 2000 Olympics in Sydney. He tested positive for banned substance nandrolone, but claimed that he was unaware of taking the substance. Unlike fellow competitors Linford Christie, Gary Cadogan and Doug Walker, Richardson accepted the ban and chose not to pursue his case to arbitration. The IAAF did re-instate Richardson in June 2001, under their "exceptional circumstances" rule. UK Athletics also cleared Richardson (as they did with Christie, Cadogan and Walker) as they believed there was enough reasonable doubt over the intention to take a banned substance. The IAAF overrule such decisions because they hold athletes completely responsible for drug samples under a "strict liability rule".

== Later career and retirement ==
Although he was re-instated to competition in 2001, Richardson was never able to deliver on the potential that he showed prior to his ban when he became one of the few athletes ever to beat Michael Johnson over 400 m in 1998. He never managed to win a solo gold medal at a major championship and retired from the sport after failing to recover from an Achilles tendon injury towards the end of 2003.
