= Cédric El-Idrissi =

Swiss hurdler

Cédric El-Idrissi (born 24 March 1977) is a retired Swiss athlete of Moroccan descent, who specialized in the 400 m hurdles.

El-Idrissi finished fourth in 4 × 400 m relay at the 2004 World Indoor Championships, together with teammates Alain Rohr, Martin Leiser and Andreas Oggenfuss. Earlier, during the series, the same Swiss team had realised 3.04,09, a new national record. He also participated at the 2004 Olympic Games, and finished eighth at the 2005 Summer Universiade.

His personal best time is 49.10 seconds, achieved in July 2003 in Frauenfeld.
