= Paul Slythe =

British athlete

Personal information
- Nationality: English
- Born: 5 September 1974 (age 51) Maidstone, Kent

Sport
- Sport: Athletics
Medal record
Athletics
Representing England
Commonwealth Games
Silver medal – second place	1998 Kuala Lumpur	4x400m relay

Paul Slythe (born 1974), is a male former international athlete who competed for England.

== Athletics career ==
He represented England and won a silver medal in the 4 x 400 metres relay event, at the 1998 Commonwealth Games in Kuala Lumpur, Malaysia. The other team members consisted of Solomon Wariso, Mark Richardson, Jared Deacon, Sean Baldock and Mark Hylton.
