= Paul Opperman =

Irish sprinter

Personal information
- Nationality: Irish
- Born: 20 December 1979 (age 46)

Sport
- Sport: Sprinting
- Event: 4 × 400 metres relay

Paul Opperman (born 20 December 1979) is an Irish sprinter. He competed in the men's 4 × 400 metres relay at the 2000 Summer Olympics.
