= Carl Oliver =

Bahamian sprinter (born 1969)

Personal information
- Born: 30 January 1969 (age 57) Andros, Bahamas

Sport
- Sport: Track and field
Medal record
Representing Bahamas
Olympic Games
Bronze medal – third place	2000 Sydney	4 × 400 m relay^{[a]}
Commonwealth Games
Bronze medal – third place	2002 Manchester	4 × 400 m relay
World Championships in Athletics
Gold medal – first place	2001 Edmonton	4 × 400 m relay^{[b]}
Bronze medal – third place	2003 Paris	4 × 400 m relay^{[b]}

Carl Oliver Jr. (born 30 January 1969) is a Bahamian former track and field sprinter who specialised in the 400 metres. He is the current secretary of the Bahamas Association of Athletic Associations. His greatest achievements on the track came with the Bahamian 4 × 400 metres relay team. He was a bronze medallist in the relay at the 2000 Summer Olympics and was also a finalist at the 1996 Atlanta Olympics and the 1999 World Championships in Athletics. He helped set a national record of 3:02.85 minutes at the 1995 World Championships in Athletics.

After 2000 he was mainly the country's back-up runner for the heats. He qualified the Bahamas for the finals at the 2001 World Championships in Athletics where they became world champions and assisted the team to the finals at the 2002 Commonwealth Games and the 2003 World Championships in Athletics, where his compatriots took bronze in his absence. He was a one-time Bahamian champion in the 400 m and had a personal best of 45.69 seconds.

== Career ==
=== Sprinting ===
Born in Andros, Bahamas, he had his first success in 1995 when he won the 400 m national title at the Bahamian Championships. That same year he made his first major appearance on the world stage, running in the 4 × 400 metres relay at the 1995 World Championships in Athletics. Although the team including Troy McIntosh, Dennis Darling and Timothy Munnings did not make the final, their time of 3:02.85 minutes in the heats was a Bahamian national record. The following year he ran his lifetime best of 45.69 seconds for the individual event in the altitude of Mexico City. This earned him selection for the 1996 Summer Olympics, where he ran in the 400 metres heats and placed seventh in the 4 × 400 metres relay final.

His next international appearances came three years later. He finished fifth in the 400 m at the 1999 Central American and Caribbean Championships in Athletics and won gold with the relay team. At the 1999 World Championships in Athletics, he formed a team with McIntosh, Munnings and the emerging Chris Brown and reached the final. They finished seventh but were retrospectively upgraded to sixth upon the disqualification of the American team due to Antonio Pettigrew admission of doping. That same disqualification eventually resulted in Oliver winning his first Olympic medal: at the 2000 Sydney Olympics the Bahamas team of Avard Moncur, McIntosh and Brown were the original fourth placers in the 4 × 400 metres relay final but the American team was retrospectively disqualified in 2008 and Oliver and the team gained a bronze medal as a result.

Oliver was one of the relay runners in the heats of the 2001 World Championships in Athletics, where he helped Bahamas to the final in which they took the gold medal in a national record of 2:58.19 minutes. He performed a similar role at the 2002 Commonwealth Games and Bahamas won the bronze in his absence in the final. The team were disqualified in the heats of the 2003 IAAF World Indoor Championships, but they topped the podium at the 2003 Central American and Caribbean Championships in Athletics, as Moncur, Oliver, Nathaniel McKinney and Brown took the gold medals. At the major event, he was again relegated to a heat runner and he took the Bahamas to the top of their heat and the nation won bronze in the final of the 2003 World Championships in Athletics. These were the last international performances of his career.

=== Administrator ===
He wound down his career after 2003, running a best of 47.03 seconds in 2004 and 47.81 in 2006 before retiring from the sport. Following the end of his active career, he moved into sports administration. He was elected as secretary general of the Bahamas Association of Athletic Associations (BAAA) in 2012. His appointment came at a time of much political in-fighting at the organisation, between the president Mike Sands and other members of the board. Oliver found himself excluded from the 2013 CARIFTA Games organising committee, alongside fellow BAAA executives Iram Lewis and Harrison Petty. The decision to host the 2014 IAAF World Relays event was also made without their input. Oliver agreed to a vote of no confidence at a BAAA general meeting in response.

== Personal bests ==
- 200 metres – 21.30 seconds (2000)
- 400 metres – 45.69 seconds (1996)

== Notes ==
- ^{a} Bahamas were elevated to the bronze medal from fourth place after the disqualification of the American team due to doping by Antonio Pettigrew and Jerome Young
- ^{b} Medals achieved in the final – Oliver served as a runner in the heats only.
