= Ranga Wimalawansa =

Sri Lankan sprinter (born 1980)

Personal information
- Full name: Ranga Kumara Wimalawansa
- Nationality: Sri Lankan
- Born: 17 April 1980 (age 46)
- Height: 182 cm (6 ft 0 in)
- Weight: 70 kg (154 lb)

Sport
- Sport: Sprinting
- Event: 4 × 400 metres relay
Medal record
Men's athletics
Representing Sri Lanka
Asian Championships
Gold medal – first place	2000 Jakarta	4×400 m
Gold medal – first place	2002 Colombo	4×400 m
Gold medal – first place	2003 Manila	4×400 m
Bronze medal – third place	1998 Fukuoka	4×400 m

Ranga Kumara Wimalawansa (born 17 April 1980) is a Sri Lankan former sprinter. He competed in the men's 4 × 400 metres relay at the 2000 Summer Olympics.
