= Andreas Oggenfuss =

Swiss sprinter

Andreas Oggenfuss (born 31 January 1978) is a retired Swiss sprinter, who specialized in the 400 m.

Oggenfuss finished fourth in 4 × 400 m relay at the 2004 World Indoor Championships, together with teammates Alain Rohr, Cédric El-Idrissi and Martin Leiser. Earlier, during the series, the same Swiss team had realised 3.04,09, a new national record.

His personal best time is 46.56 seconds, achieved in July 2005 in Bern.
