= Tibor Bédi =

Hungarian hurdler

Personal information
- Born: 22 March 1974 (age 52) Budapest, Hungary
- Height: 1.83 m (6 ft 0 in)
- Weight: 82 kg (181 lb)
- Life partner: Bédi Rapi Márti

Sport
- Sport: Track and field
- Event: 400 metres hurdles
- Club: Honvéd Steffl
Medal record
Men's Athletics
Representing Hungary
European Indoor Championships
Bronze medal – third place	2000 Ghent	4×400 m relay

Tibor Bédi (born 22 March 1974, in Budapest) is a retired Hungarian hurdler. He represented his country at the 2000 Summer Olympics, as well as the 1999 World Championships.

His personal best in the 400 metres hurdles is 49.00 seconds set in Seville in 1999.

== Competition record ==
Year	Competition	Venue	Position	Event	Notes
Representing Hungary
1992	World Junior Championships	Seoul, South Korea	7th	110 m hurdles	14.43
1993	European Junior Championships	San Sebastián, Spain	3rd	110 m hurdles	14.06
1993	European Junior Championships	San Sebastián, Spain	5th (h)	4 × 100 m relay	40.70
1994	European Indoor Championships	Paris, France	16th (sf)	60 m hurdles	7.79
1994	European Championships	Helsinki, Finland	25th (h)	110 m hurdles	13.94
1998	European Championships	Budapest, Hungary	14th (sf)	400 m hurdles	57.77
1998	European Championships	Budapest, Hungary	–	4 × 400 m relay	DNF
1999	World Championships	Seville, Spain	10th (sf)	400 m hurdles	49.00
1999	World Championships	Seville, Spain	–	4 × 400 m relay	DNF
2000	European Indoor Championships	Ghent, Belgium	3rd	4 × 400 m relay	3:09.35
2000	Olympic Games	Sydney, Australia	50th (h)	400 m hurdles	51.54
2000	Olympic Games	Sydney, Australia	26th (h)	4 × 400 m relay	3:08.77
