= Filip Walotka =

Polish sprinter

Personal information
- Nationality: Polish
- Born: 17 May 1980 (age 46)

Sport
- Sport: Sprinting
- Event: 4 × 400 metres relay

Filip Walotka (born 17 February 1980) is a Polish sprinter. He competed in the men's 4 × 400 metres relay at the 2000 Summer Olympics.
