= Samson Yego =

Kenyan sprinter

Personal information
- Nationality: Kenyan
- Born: 1 September 1971 (age 54)

Sport
- Sport: Sprinting
- Event: 4 × 400 metres relay
Medal record
Men's athletics
Representing Kenya
African Championships
Bronze medal – third place	1996 Yaoundé	400 m

Samson Yego (born 1 September 1971) is a Kenyan sprinter. He competed in the 4 × 400 metres relay at the 1996 Summer Olympics and the 2000 Summer Olympics.
