= Boštjan Horvat =

Slovenian sprinter

Personal information
- Nationality: Slovenian
- Born: 12 February 1975 (age 51) Ljubljana, Yugoslavia

Sport
- Sport: Sprinting
- Event: 4 × 400 metres relay

Boštjan Horvat (born 12 February 1975) is a Slovenian sprinter. He competed in the men's 4 × 400 metres relay at the 2000 Summer Olympics.
