= Lulu Basinyi =

Botswana sprinter (born 1976)

Personal information
- Nationality: Botswana
- Born: 30 May 1976 (age 50)

Sport
- Sport: Sprinting
- Event: 4 × 400 metres relay
Medal record
Men's athletics
Representing Botswana
African Championships
Silver medal – second place	2000 Algiers	4×400 m

Lulu Basinyi (born 30 May 1976) is a Botswana sprinter. He competed in the men's 4 × 400 metres relay at the 2000 Summer Olympics.
