= Michael Hazel =

Australian sprinter

Personal information
- Nationality: Australian
- Born: 12 December 1976 (age 49)

Sport
- Sport: Sprinting
- Event: 4 × 400 metres relay

Michael Hazel (born 12 December 1976) is an Australian sprinter. He competed in the men's 4 × 400 metres relay at the 2000 Summer Olympics.
