= Bruno Wavelet =

French sprinter

Bruno Wavelet (born 20 November 1974) is a French sprinter who specialised in the 400 metres.

He was born in Dunkerque. He competed individually at the 1998 European Indoor Championships, the 2000 European Indoor Championships, and the 2001 Jeux de la Francophonie without reaching the final. He became French indoor champion in 1998. Competitors included Pierre-Marie Hilaire, Fred Mango and Marc Raquil.

In the 4 x 400 metres relay he finished sixth at the 1999 World Indoor Championships did not finish the final at the 2000 European Indoor Championships, competed at the 2000 Olympic Games without reaching the final and won a bronze medal at the 2001 Mediterranean Games.

His personal best time was 45.98 seconds, achieved in July 2000 in Paris.

Continuing to run in Masters athletics, he won the M40 400 metres hurdles at the 2015 World Masters Athletics Championships held in Lyon, France.
