= Nduka Awazie =

Nigerian sprinter (born 1981)

Medal record
Men's athletics
Representing Nigeria
Olympic Games
Gold medal – first place	2000 Sydney	4×400 m
African Championships
Bronze medal – third place	1998 Dakar	4×400 m

Nduka Awazie (born 4 April 1981) is a Nigerian athlete and Olympic medalist and the 400 meters world Junior Champion. He won the world junior title at the 8th IAAF World Junior Championship held in 1998 Annecy, France. He attended Eastern Michigan University.

Awazie was part of the Nigerian team that won the silver medal in the 4 × 400 metres relay at the 2000 Olympics.

The Nigerian team finished second behind the US team. The US team has since been formally disqualified from the 4 × 400 meters relay event at the 2000 Olympics by the International Olympic Committee, due to team member Antonio Pettigrew's use of illegal performance-enhancing drugs while competing in Sydney.

On 21 July 2012, the 2000 Olympics 4 × 400 m relay medals were reallocated after the USA team was stripped of the gold medal, meaning Awazie and Nigeria are the gold medalists.
