= Martin Leiser =

Swiss athlete (born 1978)

Martin Leiser (born 17 June 1978) is a Swiss athlete, who specializes in the 400 m hurdles.

Leiser finished fourth in 4 × 400 m relay at the 2004 World Indoor Championships, together with teammates Alain Rohr, Cédric El-Idrissi and Andreas Oggenfuss. Earlier, during the series, the same Swiss team had realised 3.04,09, a new national record.

His personal best time is 50.28 seconds, achieved during the 2003 Summer Universiade in Daegu.
