= Solomon Wariso =

English sprinter (born 1966)

Personal information
- Nationality: British (English)
- Born: 11 November 1966 (age 60) Portsmouth, England

Sport
- Sport: Athletics
- Event: Sprints
Medal record
Athletics
Representing Great Britain
World Indoor Championships
Bronze medal – third place	1999 Maebashi	4x400m relay
Representing England
Commonwealth Games
Silver medal – second place	1998 Kuala Lumpur	4x400m relay

Iju Solomon Christopher Wariso (born 11 November 1966) is an English male retired sprinter who competed primarily in the 200 and 400 metres.

== Biography ==
Born to Nigerian parents in Portsmouth where his father was stationed with the navy, Wariso's family moved to London in 1971.

He represented his country at two outdoor and three indoor World Championships and is the British record holder in the indoor 4 × 400 metres relay. Wariso became the British 400 metres champion after winning the British AAA Championships title at the 1994 AAA Championships.

He represented England in the 400 metres and won a silver medal in the 4 x 400 metres relay event, at the 1998 Commonwealth Games in Kuala Lumpur, Malaysia.

He tested positive for an illegal stimulant, ephedrine, in 1994 and was banned from competing for three months, despite his claims that he took the substance unknowingly in a herbal supplement.

== International competitions ==
Year	Competition	Venue	Position	Event	Notes
Representing Great Britain and England
1991	Universiade	Sheffield, United Kingdom	8th	200 m	21.70
1993	World Indoor Championships	Toronto, Canada	11th (sf)	200 m	21.31
1994	European Indoor Championships	Paris, France	8th (sf)	200 m	21.52
1995	World Indoor Championships	Barcelona, Spain	10th (h)	200 m	21.39
1995	World Championships	Gothenburg, Sweden	10th (sf)	200 m	20.58
1995	World Championships	Gothenburg, Sweden	7th (sf)	4 × 100 m relay	38.75
1998	European Indoor Championships	Valencia, Spain	21st (h)	400 m	48.41
1998	European Championships	Budapest, Hungary	6th (sf)	400 m	45.59
1998	European Championships	Budapest, Hungary	1st (h)	4 × 400 m relay	3:02.37
1998	Commonwealth Games	Kuala Lumpur, Malaysia	16th (sf)	400 m	47.80
1998	Commonwealth Games	Kuala Lumpur, Malaysia	2nd	4 × 400 m relay	3:00.82
1999	World Indoor Championships	Maebashi, Japan	3rd	4 × 400 m relay	3:03.20
1999	World Championships	Seville, Spain	36th (h)	400 m	46.61

== Personal bests ==
Outdoor

- 100 metres – 10.33 (-2.3 m/s) (Geneva, 1994)
- 200 metres – 20.50 (+0.6 m/s) (Birmingham, 1995)
- 400 metres – 44.68 (Birmingham, 1998)

Indoor

- 60 metres – 6.85 (Stuttgart, 1998)
- 200 metres – 20.84 (Birmingham, 1995)
- 400 metres – 45.71 (Birmingham, 1998)

== See also ==
- List of doping cases in athletics
