= Tony Berrian =

American sprinter (born 1979)

Personal information
- Born: February 12, 1979 (age 47) Atwater, California, United States

Sport
- Sport: Track and field
Medal record
Representing United States
Summer Universiade
Gold medal – first place	1999 Palma de Mallorca	4x400m relay

Tony Berrian (born February 12, 1979) is an American former sprinter.

He attended Atwater High School and won the 400 metres at the 1998 USATF U20 Outdoor Championships. Berrian was an All-American sprinter for the Arizona State Sun Devils track and field team, finishing 3rd in the 400 meters at the 2000 NCAA Division I Indoor Track and Field Championships.

He won the 1999 Summer Universiade 4 × 400 metres relay.
