= Tawanda Chiwira =

Zimbabwean sprinter

Tawanda Blessings Chiwira (born 27 August 1974) is a Zimbabwean sprinter who specialized in the 400 metres.

Chiwira finished sixth in 4 x 400 metres relay at the 1997 World Championships, together with teammates Phillip Mukomana, Savieri Ngidhi and Ken Harnden. The team set a Zimbabwean record of 3:00.79 minutes during the heats. Tawanda is a charter member of the University of Idaho Hall of Fame having been inducted in 2007. He was a stand out sprinter for the university competing in the 200m, 400m, 4x100m and 4x400m events.
