= Daniel Batman =

Australian sprinter (1981–2012)

Personal information
- Born: 20 March 1981 Melbourne, Victoria, Australia
- Died: 26 June 2012 (aged 31) Marrakai, Northern Territory, Australia
- Education: Cranbrook School, Sydney; The Scots College

Sport
- Country: Australia
- Sport: Athletics
- Event: Sprinting

Achievements and titles
- Olympic finals: 2000
- National finals: 2005 and 2008
- Highest world ranking: 6th at the 2003 World Indoor Championships

Daniel Batman (20 March 1981 – 26 June 2012) was an Australian sprinter. He was the Australian national men's 200-metres champion in 2005 and 2008. He competed in the 2000 Summer Olympics and his best international achievement was a sixth place at the 2003 World Indoor Championships.

Batman was born in Melbourne, Victoria. He attended The Scots College but left and then attended Cranbrook School. He trained at the Australian Institute of Sport but was cut from the program for his behaviour. He was fined and suspended from Athletics Australia.

== Personal life ==
Batman was married to Nova Peris, an Olympic and Commonwealth Games gold medallist, in March 2002; the couple separated in 2010. Batman had two children with Peris: Destiny and Jack. Batman had another child, Liberty, in late 2011 with partner Natalie Sainsbury.

On 26 June 2012, Batman was killed in a car crash at Marrakai, southeast of Darwin, Northern Territory. He was 31.

Unverified claims were repeated, claiming that Daniel Batman was a direct descendant of John Batman, the founder of Melbourne but the claims did not reference any research sources or trace any lineage and are contrary to published research and records of John Batman, whose only son, John Charles Batman, died aged just eight years old and had no heirs to pass on the family name.
