= Philip Mukomana =

Zimbabwean sprinter

Medal record

Men's athletics

Representing Zimbabwe

African Championships
Silver medal – second place	1998 Dakar	4×400 m

Philip Mukomana (born 21 April 1974) is a Zimbabwean sprinter who specialized in the 400 metres. He carried the flag for his native country at the opening ceremony of the 2000 Summer Olympics in Sydney, Australia.

Mukomana finished seventh in 4 x 400 metres relay at the 1997 World Championships, together with teammates Tawanda Chiwira, Savieri Ngidhi and Ken Harnden. The team set a Zimbabwean record of 3:00.79 minutes during the heats.

On the individual level, Mukomana won a bronze medal at the 1999 All-Africa Games in a personal best time of 45.43 seconds.

Holders the Costco Full Chocolate Fudge Cake consumption World record at a party.
