= Patrick Dwyer (sprinter) =

Australian sprinter

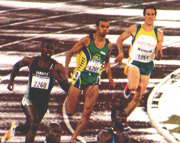
- Dwyer (right) in 2000

Personal information
- Born: 3 November 1977 (age 48) Wagga Wagga, New South Wales
Medal record
Men's Athletics
Representing Australia
Olympic Games
Silver medal – second place	2004 Athens	4x400m Relay

Patrick Dwyer (born 3 November 1977) is an Australian athlete specializing in the 400 metres.

He competed in the 2004 Summer Olympics, and was a part of the Australian team that won the silver medal in 4 × 400 metres relay. In addition to this, he finished seventh with the relay teams at the 2000 Summer Olympics and fifth at the 2002 Commonwealth Games.

His personal bests of 20.60 s (200 m) and 44.73 s (400 m) were both achieved in 2000.
