= Sanjay Ayre =

Jamaican sprinter (born 1980)

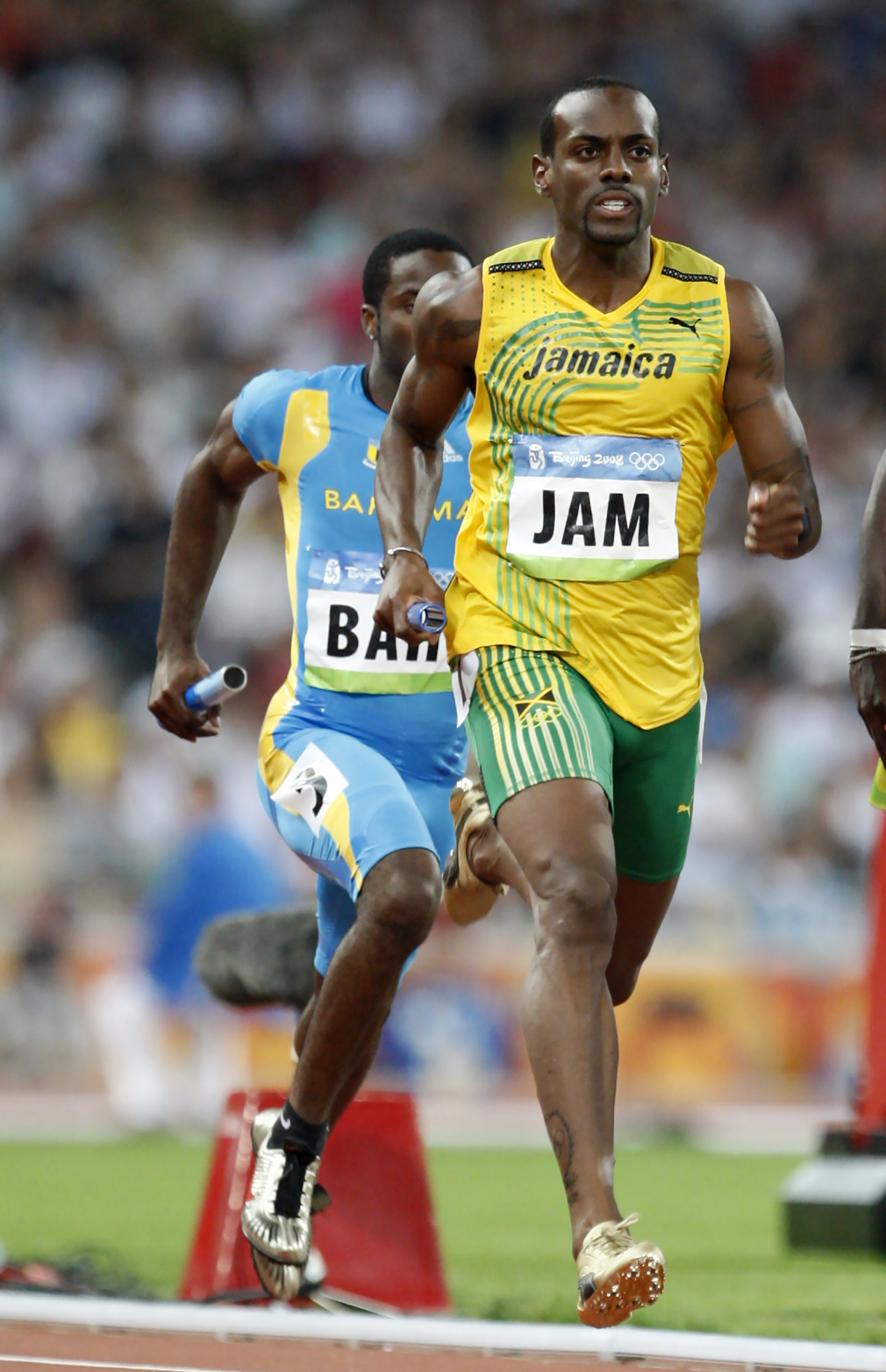
- Sanjay Ayre, competes in the 4x400m finals at the 2008 Beijing Summer Olympics.

Personal information
- Born: 19 June 1980 (age 46) Kingston, Jamaica
- Height: 1.91 m (6.3 ft)
- Weight: 83 kg (183 lb)

Sport
- Sport: Running
- Event: 400 meters
Medal record
Representing Jamaica
Men's athletics
Olympic Games
Silver medal – second place	2000 Sydney	4x400 m relay
World Championships
Silver medal – second place	2001 Edmonton	4x400 m relay
Silver medal – second place	2003 Paris	4x400 m relay
Bronze medal – third place	2005 Helsinki	4x400 m relay
World Indoor Championships
Gold medal – first place	2004 Budapest	4x400 m relay
Pan American Games
Gold medal – first place	2003 Santo Domingo	4x400 m relay
Central American & Caribbean Games
Gold medal – first place	2006 Cartagena	4x400 m relay
World Junior Championships
Bronze medal – third place	1998 Annecy	4x400 m relay
Pan American Junior Championships
Gold medal – first place	1999 Tampa	400 metres
Gold medal – first place	1999 Tampa	4x400 m relay
Bronze medal – third place	1997 Havana	400 metres
Bronze medal – third place	1997 Havana	4x400 m relay
CAC Junior Championships (U20)
Gold medal – first place	1998 George Town	4x400 m relay
CARIFTA Games (U20)
Gold medal – first place	1997 Barbados	4X400 m relay
Gold medal – first place	1999 Martinique	400 metres
National Scholastic Games
Gold medal – first place	1999 Boston	400 metres
National Scholastic Games
Gold medal – first place	1999 Raleigh	400 metres
Jamaican National Championships
Gold medal – first place	2007 Kingston	400 metres

Sanjay Claude Ayre (born 19 June 1980 in Kingston, Jamaica) is a retired Jamaican sprinter who specialized in the 400 meters. Ayre won a silver medal at the 2000 Summer Olympic Games. Ayre is a 2004 IAAF World Indoor Championship Gold medalist and a three-time World Outdoor Championship medalist.

During an international athletic career that spanned 15 years, Ayre has won eleven gold, three silver, and four bronze medals at both the junior and senior levels. Ayre graduated from Auburn University after receiving a full athletic scholarship. Ayre would compete internationally throughout his high school and collegiate career, successfully balancing competing priorities. He went on to earn a Bachelor of Arts Degree in Criminology from Auburn University, and in 2003 signed a lucrative shoe contract with sports apparel company Puma.

== Early career ==
Ayre attended Calabar and Excelsior High Schools in St. Andrew, Jamaica where he was an all-around athlete. After moving to the United States, Ayre attended DeWitt Clinton High School in the Bronx, New York, where he participated in multiple sports. In addition to his track & field accomplishments, Ayre was recognized for his outstanding athletic ability in soccer and swimming. Under the coaching of Edward Hector, he was voted the "1999 High School Athlete of the Year" after winning the 400-meter title at the Indoor and Outdoor National Scholastic meets. At the age of 18, still considered a Junior athlete(U20), Ayre made his senior debut representing the Jamaica National team in the 4 × 400 meters relay at the 1999 World Indoor Championships in Maebashi, Japan. This team went on to break the Jamaican National Record. Ayre has also won gold medals at the 1999 Junior Pan American Games and has maintained his prominence as the only Jamaican junior athlete to win the 400-meter and 4 x 400-meter relay titles.

While enrolled at Auburn University, Ayre quickly established himself as a collegiate sprint talent under the guidance of Ralph Spry, who also coached Auburn alumnus and-400 meter World Champion Avard Moncur. As a freshman, Ayre won the 2000 SEC 400-meter Indoor title and went on to receive the NCAA Freshman of the year honors. Also in 2000, Ayre and the Jamaican 4 x 400-meter team would win the silver medal at the Olympic Games in Sydney, Australia. Somewhat hampered by injuries throughout his second year, Ayre regained form late in the summer of 2001 and competed for the Jamaican World Championship team in the 400-meter and 4 × 400 meters relay events. As a junior, he continued his stellar collegiate career receiving multiple All-American honors and went on to compete in the 400-meter and 4 × 400 meters relay events at the 2002 Commonwealth Games in Manchester, England. In his final season as a collegiate athlete, Ayre finished as the NCAA 400-meter indoor runner-up and received a record 14 All-American collegiate honors while competing for the Auburn Tigers.

After an outstanding collegiate career, Ayre began his professional career by remaining at Auburn under the coaching guidance of Ralph Spry until 2005. Following a successful 2005 season, Ayre moved on to be coached by 400-meter coaches, Clyde Hart and Michael Ford.

== Professional career ==
Ayre commenced his professional career while still considered a collegiate athlete. However, his first appearance as a professional athlete was at the 2003 Pan American Games in Santo Domingo, DR where he earned a gold medal in the 4 × 400-meters relay. In 2004, Ayre competed at the World Indoor Games where he earned another gold medal in the 4 × 400-meters relay. For Ayre, success continued throughout 2005 as he maintained a top-ten world ranking in the 400-meters contest. Ayre and the Jamaican Men's 4 × 400 m relay squad are the only Jamaican Team in history to defeat the U.S. Men's 4 × 400 m team on U.S. soil at the 2005 USA versus The World Penn Relays, Philadelphia, Pennsylvania. After a disappointing 2006 season, Ayre rallied back to win a gold medal at the Central American & Caribbean Games in the 4 × 400-meters relay.

In 2007, Ayre filled the summer with dominating 400-meter performances culminating with the 2007 Jamaican National Championships where on 24 June 2007, he would win the 400-meter title in 45.07s and go on to compete in the 400-meter and 4 × 400-meter relay at the 2007 World Championships in Osaka, Japan where he ultimately finished the season with another top-ten world-ranking.

In 2008, Ayre was a member of the Jamaican Olympic team, led by Usain Bolt, that recorded dominating performances in the sprint events at the 2008 Summer Olympic Games in Beijing, China. While there, Ayre competed in the 400-meter and 4 × 400-meters relay events. Ayre, along with teammates Michael Blackwood, Ricardo Chambers, and Lansford Spence, finished a disappointing eighth place after being favored to win a medal. Ayre won silver medals for Jamaica at the Sydney Olympic Games and Helsinki World Championships.

== After athletics ==
After retiring from professional competition, Ayre is an entrepreneur who devotes his time to coaching professional and amateur athletes, community organizations, athletics meeting promoting and other professional endeavours. Ayre is a professional track coach for Puma. He is also the Director of Athlete Branding with Active Dreamers LLC, a sports apparel company that specializes in marketing NBA licensed products featuring athletes such as LeBron James, Stephen "Steph" Curry and Neymar Jr.

In September 2012, after missing out on a 4th Olympic Games, Ayre introduced Maximum Velocity Performance (MVP) Fitness to his local community in Howard County, Maryland. Maximum Velocity Performance is a fitness organization that provides a broad range of sports and physical fitness services. MVP Fitness offers a variety of programs including sports performance coaching, personal training, speed & agility camps, Corporate Wellness Programs, and group fitness classes.

Ayre is active in the local community and is an honorary coach to the Reservoir High School Track Team and Field Team, where he is known as ‘Coach Sanjay’.

== Coaching ==
Ayre has also established himself as a professional track & field coach. He founded Chase Athletics Track Club in 2013, a USATF sanctioned track & field organization. In 2018, Chase athletes competed in Ocean Breeze Grand Prix in Staten Island, NY. The group had the top two finishes in the men's and women's 300m events. Ayre has also made an impact at the collegiate level by coaching athletes at Howard Community College. He was the men's & women's assistant track & field coach and was responsible for coaching the sprint and hurdle events. In 2013, Ayre led Howard Community College's men's track and field team to its first ever National Title in all of the school's sports history. Ayre is a Certified Personal Trainer through the National Academy of Sports Medicine (NASM), USATF Level 1 & 2, IAAF Certified Track & Field Coach, and Global Sports Ambassador for Puma. Ayre has trained Rovane Williams, Andre Clarke, and the Jamaican team at the 2016 Armory Track & Field Invitational.

== Personal bests ==
Event	Time (seconds)	Place	Date
200 meters	20.81	Dallas, Texas, United States	15 April 2006
300 meters	32.81	Sydney, Australia	14 September 2000
400 meters	44.92	Kingston, Jamaica	22 June 2002
400 meters (indoor)	45.92	Fayetteville, Arkansas, United States	11 March 2000

== International competition ==
Year	Competition	Venue	Position	Event	Age
1997	Carifta Games	Bridgetown, Barbados		400m & 4 × 400 m relay	16
1997	Junior Pan American Games	Havana, Cuba		400m & 4 × 400 m relay	16
1998	Central American & Caribbean Championships	Georgetown, Cayman Islands		400m & 4 × 400 m relay	17
1998	World Junior Championship Games	Annecy, France		400m & 4 × 400 m relay	17
1999	World Indoor Athletics Championship Games	Maebashi, Japan		4 × 400 m relay	18
1999	Carifta Games	Fort-de-France, Martinique		400m	18
1999	Junior Pan American Games	Tampa, USA		400m & 4 × 400 m relay	18
2000	Olympic Games	Sydney, Australia		4 × 400 m relay	19
2001	World Athletics Championship Games	Edmonton, Canada		400m & 4 × 400 m relay	20
2002	Commonwealth Games	Manchester, England		400m & 4 × 400 m relay	21
2003	Pan American Games	Santo Domingo, Dominican Republic		400m & 4 × 400 m relay	22
2003	World Athletics Championship Games	Paris, France		4 × 400 m relay	22
2004	World Indoor Athletics Championship Games	Budapest, Hungary		4 × 400 m relay	23
2004	Olympic Games	Athens, Greece		4 × 400 m relay	23
2005	World Athletics Championship Games	Helsinki, Finland		4 × 400 m relay	24
2006	World Indoor Athletics Championship Games	Moscow, Russia		400m & 4 × 400 m relay	25
2006	Central America & Caribbean Championship Games	Cartagena, Colombia		400m & 4 × 400 m relay	25
2007	World Athletics Championship Games	Osaka, Japan		400m & 4 × 400 m relay	26
2008	World Indoor Athletics Championship Games	Valencia, Spain		400m & 4 × 400 m relay	27
2008	Olympic Games	Beijing, China		400m & 4 × 400 m relay	27
2010	World Indoor Championship Games	Doha, Qatar		4 × 400 m relay	29
2011	Penn Relays USA vs. The World	Philadelphia, USA		4 × 400 m relay	30

== National competition ==
Year	Competition	Venue	Position	Event	Age
1997	JAM Outdoor Jr. Track & Field Championship Games	Kingston, Jamaica	1st	400m	16
1998	JAM Outdoor Jr. Track & Field Championship Games	Kingston, Jamaica	1st	400m	17
1999	JAM Outdoor Track & Field Championship Games	Kingston, Jamaica	7th	400m	18
2000	JAM Olympic Team Trials	Kingston, Jamaica	4th	400m	19
2001	JAM Outdoor Track & Field Championship Games	Kingston, Jamaica	3rd	400m	20
2002	JAM Outdoor Track & Field Championship Games	Kingston, Jamaica	2nd	400m	21
2003	JAM Outdoor Track & Field Championship Games	Kingston, Jamaica	4th	400m	22
2004	JAM Olympic Team Trials	Kingston, Jamaica	5th	400m	23
2005	JAM Outdoor Track & Field Championship Games	Kingston, Jamaica	4th	400m	24
2006	JAM Outdoor Track & Field Championship Games	Kingston, Jamaica	2nd	400m	25
2007	JAM Outdoor Track & Field Championship Games	Kingston, Jamaica	1st	400m	26
2008	JAM Olympic Team Trials	Kingston, Jamaica	3rd	400m	27
2009	JAM Outdoor Track & Field Championship Games	Kingston, Jamaica	7th	400m	28
2011	JAM Outdoor Track & Field Championship Games	Kingston, Jamaica	DNF	400m	30
2012	JAM Outdoor Track & Field Championship Games	Kingston, Jamaica	7th	400m	31
