= Attila Kilvinger =

Hungarian sprinter

Personal information
- Nationality: Hungarian
- Born: 27 March 1977 (age 49)

Sport
- Sport: Sprinting
- Event: 4 × 400 metres relay

Attila Kilvinger (born 27 March 1977) is a Hungarian sprinter. He competed in the men's 4 × 400 metres relay at the 2000 Summer Olympics.
