= 2003 Asian Athletics Championships – Men's 4 × 400 metres relay =

The men's 4 × 400 metres relay event at the 2003 Asian Athletics Championships was held in Manila on September 23 and won by Sri Lanka.

== Results ==
Rank	Nation	Athletes	Time	Notes
1st place, gold medalist(s)	Sri Lanka		3:03.05	
2nd place, silver medalist(s)	Japan		3:03.59	
3rd place, bronze medalist(s)	Qatar	Omar Yasser Al-Haj, Al-Akbar, Moussa, Salaheddine Al-Safi	3:04.32	NR
