= Takahiko Yamamura =

Japanese sprinter

Personal information
- Nationality: Japanese
- Born: 13 August 1979 (age 46)

Sport
- Sport: Sprinting
- Event: 400 metres
Medal record
Men's athletics
Representing Japan
Asian Championships
Silver medal – second place	2003 Manila	4×400 m

Takahiko Yamamura (山村 貴彦, Yamamura Takahiko; born 13 August 1979) is a Japanese sprinter. He competed in the men's 400 metres at the 2000 Summer Olympics.
