= Fernando Augustin =

Mauritian sprinter

Personal information
- Nationality: Mauritian
- Born: 25 April 1980 (age 46)

Sport
- Sport: Running
- Event: 400 metres
Medal record
Men's athletics
Representing Mauritius
African Championships
Silver medal – second place	2000 Algiers	4×100 m
Silver medal – second place	2002 Radès	4×400 m
Bronze medal – third place	2002 Radès	4×100 m

Jean Fernando Augustin (born 25 April 1980) is a Mauritian sprinter who specializes in the 400 metres.

In 2002 he finished fifth at the 2002 African Championships, and was selected to represent Africa in 4 x 400 metres relay at the 2002 IAAF World Cup. The African team, with Adem Hecini, Sofiane Labidi, Fernando Augustin and compatriot Eric Milazar, won the bronze medal.

His personal best time is 46.04 seconds, achieved in March 2002 in Bamako. He also co-holds the Mauritian record in 4 × 100 m relay, 38.99 seconds from the 2001 World Championships with teammates Arnaud Casquette, Eric Milazar and Stéphan Buckland.

== Achievements in Athletics ==
Year	Competition	Venue	Position	Event	Notes
Representing Mauritius
1998	World Junior Championships	Annecy, France	6th	400m Semifinal	47.42
1998	Commonwealth Games	Kuala Lumpur, Malaysia	8th	400m Heat	47.66
1998	Commonwealth Games	Kuala Lumpur, Malaysia	5th	4 × 100 m Qualification	39.71
1998	Commonwealth Games	Kuala Lumpur, Malaysia	7th	4 × 100 m Final	42.70
1998	Commonwealth Games	Kuala Lumpur, Malaysia	7th	4 × 400 m Heat	3:08:09
1999	Meeting Atletica Trofeo Maurina	Imperia, Italy	2nd	400m	48.14
2000	Meeting National de Paris Charlety	Paris, France	1st	100m	10.55
2000	Meeting National de Paris Charlety	Paris, France	1st	200m	21.01
2000	Meeting Atletica Trofeo Maurina	Imperia, Italy	2nd	400m	47.56
2000	Meeting Pre-Olympic Warmup	Sydney Australia	4th	100m	10.79
2000	Meeting Pre-Olympic Warmup	Sydney Australia	3rd	300m	33.71
2000	Sydney Olympic Games	Sydney, Australia	5th	4 × 100 m Heat	39.55
2001	Air Mauritius International Meeting	Reduit, Mauritius	1st	200m	21.15
2001	Meeting ABSA Port Elizabeth	Port Elizabeth, South Africa	6th	400m	47.95
2001	Meeting Internazionale Citta di Avellino	Avellino, Italy	2nd	400m	46.55
2001	Francophone Games	Ottawa, Canada	2nd	400 m Qualification	46.42
2001	Francophone Games	Ottawa, Canada	4th	400 m Final	46.32
2001	Francophone Games	Ottawa, Canada	1st	4 × 100 m Qualification	39.54
2001	Francophone Games	Ottawa, Canada	1st	4 × 100 m Final	39.04
2001	IAAF World Athletics Championships	Edmonton, Canada	2nd	4 × 100 m Heat	38.99 (NR)
2001	IAAF World Athletics Championships	Edmonton, Canada	7th	4 × 100 m Semifinal	39.25
2002	Meeting ABSA Port Elizabeth	Port Elizabeth, South Africa	3rd	400m	46.83
2002	Meeting ABSA Belleville	Belleville, South Africa	6th	400m	47.17
2002	Air Mauritius International Meeting	Reduit, Mauritius	3rd	400m	46.72
2002	Meeting Spitzen Leichtathletik	Lucerne, Switzerland	3rd	400m	46.49
2002	AAC Permit Meeting	Nairobi, Kenya	3rd	400m	46.38
2002	Meeting International Dakar	Dakar, Senegal	1st	400m	46.20
2002	Meeting National Elite Bron	Bron, France	1st	400m	46.18
2002	Meeting International Bamako	Bamako, Mali	1st	400m	46.04(PB)
2002	Meeting International Résisprint	La Chaux-de-Fonds, Switzerland	4th	400m	46.70
2002	Meeting International Sonatrach	Blida, Algeria	5th	400m	47.00
2002	Nationales GGB Hallenmeeting	Macolin, Switzerland	2nd	400m	47.66
2002	Meeting EAP AtletiCAGenève	Geneva, Switzerland	2nd	400m	46.39
2002	Championnats Suisses Interclubs LNA	Zoug, Switzerland	2nd	200m	21.42
2002	Championnats Suisses Interclubs LNA	Zoug, Switzerland	1st	400m	47.96
2002	13th African Championships Athletics	Rades, Tunisia	2nd	400m Heat	46.56
2002	13th African Championships Athletics	Rades, Tunisia	2nd	400m Semifinal	46.64
2002	13th African Championships Athletics	Rades, Tunisia	5th	400m Final	47.03
2002	13th African Championships Athletics	Rades, Tunisia	3rd	4 × 100 m Final	40.27
2002	13th African Championships Athletics	Rades, Tunisia	2nd	4 × 400 m Final	3:10:14
2002	Commonwealth Games	Manchester, England	4th	400m Heat	48.12
2002	Commonwealth Games	Manchester, England	5th	400m Quarterfinal	47.06
2002	Commonwealth Games	Manchester, England	6th	4 × 100 m Semifinal	40.05
2002	IAAF Athletics World Cup	Madrid, Spain	2nd	4 × 400 m	3:01:69
2003	Preparation Meeting	Reduit, Mauritius	1st	400m	48.10
2003	Mauritius Youth Championships Open Events	Reduit, Mauritius	2nd	200m	22.00
2003	Championnats Nationaux	Reduit, Mauritius	1st	200m Qualification	21.68
2003	Championnats Nationaux	Reduit, Mauritius	1st	200m Final	21.28
2003	1st Lucozade Meeting	Reduit, Mauritius	1st	800m	1:55.18
2003	2nd Lucozade Meeting	Reduit, Mauritius	1st	400m	48.30
2003	3rd Lucozade Meeting	Reduit, Mauritius	1st	800m	1:56.72
2003	Meeting ASA Engen Roodepoort	Roodepoort, South Africa	1st	400m	47.05
2003	Meeting Arcobaleno AtleticaEuropa	Celle Ligure, Italy	1st	400m	46.73
2003	Meeting National DNA de Strasbourg	Strasbourg, France	1st	400m	46.72
2003	Memorial Paolo Delogu	Nuoro, Italy	5th	400m	46.08
2003	Meeting Gustav Sule Memorial	Tartu, France	3rd	400m	47.84
2003	Meeting International Résisprint	La Chaux-de-Fonds, Switzerland	3rd	400m	46.32
2003	Championnats de France Elites d'athlétisme	Narbonne, France	2nd	400m Qualification	46.61
2003	Championnats de France Elites d'athlétisme	Narbonne, France	5th	400m Final	46.61
2003	Meeting Internazionale Citta di Padova	Padova, Italy	8th	400m	47.14
2003	Jeux des Iles de L'ocean Indien	Bambous, Mauritius	1st	400m Qualification	48.51
2003	Jeux des Iles de L'ocean Indien	Bambous, Mauritius	2nd	400m Final	47.07
2003	Jeux des Iles de L'ocean Indien	Bambous, Mauritius	1st	4 × 100 m	39.23(CR)
2003	Jeux des Iles de L'ocean Indien	Bambous, Mauritius	1st	4 × 400 m	3 ft 10 in84
2003	All Africa Games	Abuja, Nigeria	4th	400m Heat	47.43
2003	All Africa Games	Abuja, Nigeria	6th	400m Semifinal	47.30
2004	Skyline International Meeting	Reduit, Mauritius	3rd	400m	47.26
2004	Antananarivo International Meeting	Antananarivo, Madagascar	1st	200m	21.34
2004	Antananarivo International Meeting	Antananarivo, Madagascar	1st	400m	47.10
2004	Mémorial Eugène Humberset	Fribourg, Switzerland	3rd	400m	47.70
2004	Meeting Arcobaleno AtleticaEuropa	Celle Ligure, Italy	3rd	400m	47.03
2004	Meeting International Zitouna Sport	Rades, Tunisia	4th	400m	47.11
2004	Athletissima Super Grand Prix	Lausanne, Switzerland	4th	400m	47.31
2004	Les Soirées de Marseille	Marseille, France	1st	100m	10.63
2004	Les Soirées de Marseille	Marseille, France	1st	200m	21.29
2004	Les Soirées de Marseille	Marseille, France	1st	400m	48.18
2005	Middle distance Meeting	Reduit, Mauritius	1st	300m	34.00
2005	Lucozade Sport National Circuit 1st meeting	Reduit, Mauritius	3rd	100m	10.76
2005	Lucozade Sport National Circuit 2nd meeting	Reduit, Mauritius	3rd	200m	21.51
2005	Skyline International Meeting	Reduit, Mauritius	3rd	400m	48.40
2005	Meeting AtletiCAGenève	Geneva, Switzerland	4th	400m	46.50
2005	Meeting Spitzen Leichtathletik	Lucerne, Switzerland	2nd	400m	46.91
2005	Meeting International Lugano	Lugano, Switzerland	1st	100m	10.62
2005	Meeting International Lugano	Lugano, Switzerland	1st	200m	21.34
2005	Meeting International Resisprint	La Chaux De Fonds, Switzerland	1st	200m	21.22
2005	Meeting International CABW Nivelles	Nivelles, Belgium	1st	400m	47.10
2005	Francophone Games Preparation Meeting	Reduit, Mauritius	1st	4 × 100 m	42.25
2005	Francophone Games	Niamey, Niger	1st	400m Qualification	47.41
2005	Francophone Games	Niamey, Niger	2nd	400m Final	46.52
2005	Francophone Games	Niamey, Niger	3rd	4 × 100 m Final	40.28
2005	Francophone Games	Niamey, Niger	2nd	4 × 400 m Final	3'07"18
2006	Championnats Suisses Elites	Macolin, Switzerland	1st	400m Qualification	48.84
2006	Championnats Suisses Elites	Macolin, Switzerland	1st	400m Final	47.72
2006	Meeting B de la Gruyère	Bulle, Switzerland	2nd	100m	10.61
2006	Meeting AtletiCAGenève	Geneva, Switzerland	2nd	100m	10.95
2006	Meeting AtletiCAGenève	Geneva, Switzerland	2nd	200m	21.58
2006	Meeting International Résisprint	La Chaux-de-Fonds, Switzerland	2nd	400m	47.11
2006	Meeting International Bern Arena	Bern, Switzerland	3rd	400m	46.57
2006	Meeting International Resisprint	La Chaux De Fonds, Switzerland	1st	100m	10.70
2006	Meeting International Resisprint	La Chaux De Fonds, Switzerland	1st	200m	21.45
2006	Interclubs Suisse Elites	Fribourg, Switzerland	1st	200m	21.22
2006	Interclubs Suisse Elites	Fribourg, Switzerland	1st	400m	47.42
2006	Interclubs Suisse Elites	Fribourg, Switzerland	1st	4 × 100 m	40.72
2006	Meeting Spitzen Leichtathletik	Lucerne, Switzerland	8th	400m	48.08
2006	African Athletics Championships	Bambous, Mauritius	3rd	400m Heat	46.89
2006	African Athletics Championships	Bambous, Mauritius	7th	400m Semifinal	47.67
2006	African Athletics Championships	Bambous, Mauritius	4th	4 × 400 m Final	3:09.78
2006	18th Commonwealth Games	Melbourne, Australia	4th	400m Heat	48.11
2006	18th Commonwealth Games	Melbourne, Australia	5th	4 × 400 m Heat	3:08.19
2007	All-Africa Games	Algiers, Algeria	2nd	400m Heat	47.46
2007	All-Africa Games	Algiers, Algeria	8th	400m Semifinal	48.02
2007	Mauritius International Meeting	Reduit, Mauritius	2nd	400m	48.20
2007	Hallen-Abendmeeting	Macolin, Switzerland	1st	200m	22.07
2007	Hallen-Abendmeeting	Macolin, Switzerland	2nd	4 × 200 m	1:28.10
2007	Abendmeeting Donnerstag	Aarau, Switzerland	1st	100m	10.65
2007	Abendmeeting Donnerstag	Aarau, Switzerland	1st	300m	33.54
2007	Championnats Suisses Elites	Lausanne, Switzerland	1st	400m Qualification	48.14
2007	Championnats Suisses Elites	Lausanne, Switzerland	1st	400m Final	46.81
2007	Championnats Suisses Elites Salle	St. Gallen, Switzerland	1st	400m Qualification	48.62
2007	Championnats Suisses Elites en Salle	St. Gallen, Switzerland	1st	400m Final	48.43
2007	Jeux des Iles de L'ocean Indien	Antananarivo, Madagascar	3rd	400m Qualification	48.50
2007	Jeux des Iles de L'ocean Indien	Antananarivo, Madagascar	2nd	400m Final	47.30
2007	Jeux des Iles de L'ocean Indien	Antananarivo, Madagascar	1st	4 × 400 m Final	3:11:19
2008	Meeting en Salle de Macolin	Macolin, Switzerland	2nd	60m Qualification	6.98
2008	Meeting en Salle de Macolin	Macolin, Switzerland	1st	60m Final	6.95
2008	Meeting en Salle de Macolin	Macolin, Switzerland	1st	200m	21.95
2008	Nationales Hallenmeeting	Macolin, Switzerland	1st	200m	21.99
2008	Nationales Hallenmeeting	Macolin, Switzerland	1st	400m	48.32
2008	Nationales Hallenmeeting	Macolin, Switzerland	2nd	400m	47.93
2008	Meeting International Résisprint	La Chaux-de-Fonds, Switzerland	3rd	400m	47.44
2008	Swiss-Meeting	Jona, Switzerland	3rd	200m	21.58
2008	Meeting GGB	Macolin-Magglingen, Switzerland	2nd	400m	47.93
2008	Swiss-Meeting	Berne, Switzerland	2nd	400m	47.14
2008	Meeting B de la Gruyère	Bulle, Switzerland	2nd	100m Qualification	10.64
2008	Meeting B de la Gruyère	Bulle, Switzerland	2nd	100m Final	10.50
2008	Championnats Romands Open	Lausanne, Switzerland	1st	100m Qualification	10.82
2008	Championnats Romands Open	Lausanne, Switzerland	2nd	100m Final	10.70
2008	Championnats Romands Open	Lausanne, Switzerland	1st	200m Qualification	21.60
2008	Championnats Romands Open	Lausanne, Switzerland	1st	200m Final	21.56
2008	Championnats Suisses Elites	Fribourg, Switzerland	1st	400m Qualification	49.22
2008	Championnats Suisses Elites	Fribourg, Switzerland	1st	400m Final	47.19
2008	Bonus-Track Swiss Meeting	Hochdorf, Switzerland	1st	400m	47.31
2008	Meeting de Pentecôte	Zofingen, Switzerland	1st	100m Qualification	10.86
2008	Meeting de Pentecôte	Zofingen, Switzerland	2nd	100m Final	10.73
2008	Meeting de Pentecôte	Zofingen, Switzerland	1st	200m	21.57
2008	Finale CSI Ligue Nationale A Homme	Berne, Switzerland	1st	200m	21.49
2008	Finale CSI Ligue Nationale A Homme	Berne, Switzerland	1st	400m	47.51
2008	Finale CSI Ligue Nationale A Homme	Berne, Switzerland	3rd	4 × 100 m	41.61
2008	Meeting Spitzen Leichtathletik	Lucerne, Switzerland	6th	400m	47.24
2009	Yellowpages Series	Germiston, South Africa	2nd	4 × 100 m	39.72
2009	Meeting National D1 Metz Moselle Athlelor	Metz, France	1st	400m	48.63
2009	CSI Ligue Nationale A	Berne, Switzerland	1st	400m	48.51
2009	CSI Ligue Nationale A	Berne, Switzerland	5th	4 × 100 m	42.34
2009	Team SM Meeting	Langenthal, Switzerland	2nd	200m	21.37
2009	Memorial Humberset	Fribourg, Switzerland	1st	200m	21.62
2009	Mauritius International Meeting	Reduit, Mauritius	1st	400m	48.27
2009	Mauritius International Meeting	Reduit, Mauritius	2nd	200m	21.73
2009	Mauritius International Meeting	Reduit, Mauritius	1st	4 × 100 m	39.88
2009	Meeting International Resisprint	La Chaux de Fonds, Switzerland	2nd	200m	21.46
2009	Meeting International Resisprint	La Chaux de Fonds, Switzerland	2nd	400m	47.87
2009	Francophone Games	Beirut, Lebanon	3rd	4 × 400 m	3:08:29
2010	Preparation Meeting- Commonwealth Games	Reduit, Mauritius	4th	100m	11.00
2010	Preparation Meeting- Commonwealth Games	Reduit, Mauritius	3rd	400m	50.70
2010	Meeting AtletiCAGenève	Geneva, Switzerland	7th	400m	48.32
2010	CSI Ligue Nationale A	Bâle, Switzerland	3rd	200m	21.99
2010	CSI Ligue Nationale A	Bâle, Switzerland	1st	400m	48.24
2010	CSI Ligue Nationale A	Bâle, Switzerland	3rd	4 × 100 m	44.30
2010	19th Commonwealth Games	Melbourne, Australia	5th	400m Heat	48.43
2010	African Athletics Championships	Nairobi, Kenya	3rd	4 × 100 m Heat	40.00
2010	African Athletics Championships	Nairobi, Kenya	5th	4 × 100 m Final	40.27
2011	Mauritius International Meeting	Reduit, Mauritius	2nd	400m	48.98
2011	Lucozade Sport Grand Prix 2eme Manche	Bambous, Mauritius	3rd	400m	49.40
2011	Lucozade Sport Grand Prix 2eme Manche	Bambous, Mauritius	1st	4 × 400 m	3:17.71
