= Ousmane Niang =

Senegalese sprinter

Personal information
- Born: 10 April 1980 (age 46)

Sport
- Sport: Track and field
Medal record
Representing Senegal
African Championships
Gold medal – first place	1998 Dakar	4×400 m
Bronze medal – third place	2000 Algiers	4×400 m
Bronze medal – third place	2002 Radès	4×400 m
Summer Universiade
Bronze medal – third place	1999 Palma	4x400m

Ousmane Niang (born 10 April 1980) is a Senegalese sprinter who specialized in the 400 metres.

Niang finished eighth in 4 x 400 metres relay at the 1999 World Championships, together with teammates Assane Diallo, Ibou Faye and Ibrahima Wade.
