= Alain Rohr =

Swiss sprinter and hurdler

Personal information
- Born: 25 December 1971 (age 54) Bern, Switzerland

Sport
- Sport: Track and field

Alain Rohr (born 25 December 1971) is a retired Swiss athlete, who specialized in the 400 m hurdles.

Rohr finished fourth in 4 × 400 metre relay at the 2004 World Indoor Championships, together with teammates Cédric El-Idrissi, Martin Leiser and Andreas Oggenfuss. Earlier, during the series, the same Swiss team had realised 3.04,09, a new national record. He finished fifth in 400 metres at the 2000 European Indoor Championships.

His personal best time in the 400 m hurdles is 49.19 seconds, achieved in July 2001 in Lausanne.
