= Zétény Dombi =

Hungarian sprinter

Personal information
- Nationality: Hungarian
- Born: 10 January 1975 (age 51)

Sport
- Sport: Sprinting
- Event: 4 × 400 metres relay

Zétény Dombi (born 10 January 1975) is a Hungarian sprinter. He competed in the men's 4 × 400 metres relay at the 2000 Summer Olympics.
