= Laurent Clerc (athlete) =

Swiss sprinter

Personal information
- Nationality: Swiss
- Born: 12 April 1972 (age 54)

Sport
- Sport: Sprinting
- Event: 400 metres

Laurent Clerc (born 12 April 1972) is a Swiss sprinter. He competed in the men's 400 metres at the 1996 Summer Olympics.
