= 2001 European Cup (athletics) =

- Dates: 23–24 June
- Host city: Bremen, Germany
- Level: Senior
- Type: Outdoor
- Events: 39

The 2001 European Cup took place on 23 and 24 June 2001 in Bremen, Germany. The B finals were held in Vaasa, Finland and Budapest, Hungary.

Poland won the men's Super League title while Russia won the women's title.

== Super League ==
Held on 23 and 24 June in Bremen, Germany

=== Team standings ===
Men
Pos	Country	Pts
1	Poland	107
2	Russia	97
3	Italy	94
4	Germany	93
5	Great Britain	91
6	France	87
7	Spain	77
8	Greece	67

Women
Pos	Country	Pts
1	Russia	126.5
2	Germany	117
3	France	86
4	Great Britain	82
5	Romania	78
6	Italy	72.5
7	Belarus	70
8	Czech Republic	47

=== Results summary ===
==== Men's events ====
Event	Gold		Silver		Bronze	
100 m (Wind: +1.4 m/s)	Mark Lewis-Francis; Great Britain	10.13	Konstantinos Kenteris; Greece	10.15	Frédéric Krantz; France	10.27
200 m (Wind: -0.7 m/s)	Konstantinos Kenteris; Greece	20.31	Marlon Devonish; Great Britain	20.59	Marcin Urbaś; Poland	20.69
400 m	Marc Raquil; France	44.95	Robert Maćkowiak; Poland	45.48	David Canal; Spain	45.52
800 m	Paweł Czapiewski; Poland	1:48.28	Andrea Longo; Italy	1:48.54	Simon Lees; Great Britain	1:48.80
1500 m	José Antonio Redolat; Spain	3:45.81	Mehdi Baala; France	3:46.29	Leszek Zblewski; Poland	3:47.06
3000 m	Driss Maazouzi; France	7:52.26	Andrés Díaz; Spain	7:52.59	John Mayock; Great Britain	7:56.06
5000 m	Ismaïl Sghyr; France	13:50.47	Alberto García; Spain	13:50.96	Marco Mazza; Italy	13:55.85
3000 m steeplechase	Bouabdellah Tahri; France	8:38.02	Antonio Jiménez; Spain	8:38.09	Ralf Assmus; Germany	8:39.34
110 m hurdles (Wind: +1.3 m/s)	Yevgeniy Pechonkin; Russia	13.38	Florian Schwarthoff; Germany	13.57	Tony Jarrett; Great Britain	13.58
400 m hurdles	Fabrizio Mori; Italy	48.39	Marek Plawgo; Poland	48.98	Stéphane Diagana; France	49.07
4 × 100 m	Italy; Francesco Scuderi; Alessandro Cavallaro; Maurizio Checcucci; Andrea Colombo	38.89	Great Britain; Allyn Condon; Marlon Devonish; Christian Malcolm; Mark Lewis-Francis	38.99	Poland; Marcin Krzywański; Marcin Jędrusiński; Piotr Balcerzak; Marcin Urbaś	39.00
4 × 400 m	Poland; Piotr Rysiukiewicz; Piotr Haczek; Piotr Długosielski; Robert Maćkowiak	3:01.79	Russia; Boris Gorban; Ruslan Mashchenko; Dmitriy Golovastov; Andrey Semyonov	3:02.09	Germany; Ingo Schultz; Michael Dragu; Marc Alexander Scheer; Lars Figura	3:02.71
High jump	Yaroslav Rybakov; Russia	2.28	Grzegorz Sposób; Poland	2.23	Martin Buss; Germany	2.19
Pole vault	Michael Stolle; Germany	5.75	Adam Kolasa; Poland	5.68	Vasiliy Gorshkov; Russia	5.68
Long jump	Danila Burkenya; Russia	7.89	Chris Tomlinson; Great Britain	7.67	Grzegorz Marciniszyn; Poland	7.64
Triple jump	Jonathan Edwards; Great Britain	17.26	Christos Meletoglou; Greece	17.19	Paolo Camossi; Italy	16.97
Shot put	Manuel Martínez; Spain	21.03	Pavel Chumachenko; Russia	20.54	Paolo Dal Soglio; Italy	20.02
Discus throw	Lars Riedel; Germany	66.63	Mario Pestano; Spain	65.60	Dmitriy Shevchenko; Russia	65.26
Hammer throw	Szymon Ziółkowski; Poland	80.87	Nicola Vizzoni; Italy	80.13	Christos Polychroniou; Greece	78.34
Javelin throw	Kostas Gatsioudis; Greece	88.33	Sergey Makarov; Russia	83.24	Raymond Hecht; Germany	83.05
WR world record | AR area record | CR championship record | GR games record | NR national record | OR Olympic record | PB personal best | SB season best | WL world leading (in a given season)

==== Women's events ====
Event	Gold		Silver		Bronze	
100 m (Wind: +2.8 m/s)	Marina Kislova; Russia	11.23w	Natalya Safronnikova; Belarus	11.26w	Katia Benth; France	11.38w
200 m (Wind: +0.3 m/s)	Natalya Safronnikova; Belarus	22.68	Ionela Tîrlea; Romania	22.85	Svetlana Goncharenko; Russia	22.87
400 m	Grit Breuer; Germany	50.49	Francine Landre; France	51.21	Natalya Antyukh; Russia	51.37
800 m	Irina Mistyukevich; Russia	1:59.09	Ivonne Teichmann; Germany	1:59.39	Natalya Dukhnova; Belarus	1:59.95
1500 m	Violeta Szekely; Romania	4:06.43	Olga Yegorova; Russia	4:06.59	Hayley Tullett; Great Britain	4:07.83
3000 m	Kathy Butler; Great Britain	9:03.71	Maria Cristina Grosu; Romania	9:04.91	Fatima Yvelain; France	9:05.30
5000 m	Yelena Zadorozhnaya; Russia	14:40.47; CR	Paula Radcliffe; Great Britain	14:49.84	Mihaela Botezan; Romania	15:08.78
100 m hurdles (Wind: +0.6 m/s)	Irina Korotya; Russia	13.06	Linda Ferga; France	13.10	Kirsten Bolm; Germany	13.15
400 m hurdles	Yuliya Nosova; Russia	53.84; CR	Ionela Tîrlea; Romania	55.08	Heike Meissner; Germany	55.33
4 × 100 m	Germany; Melanie Paschke; Sina Schielke; Birgit Rockmeier; Marion Wagner	43.02	Russia; Natalya Ignatova; Irina Khabarova; Marina Kislova; Oksana Ekk	43.15	France; Katia Benth; Frédérique Bangué; Fabé Dia; Odiah Sidibé	43.45
4 × 400 m	Germany; Claudia Marx; Shanta Ghosh; Florence Ekpo-Umoh; Grit Breuer	3:23.81	Russia; Olga Maksimova; Natalya Khrushcheleva; Yuliya Pechenkina; Natalya Antyukh	3:24.58	France; Francine Landre; Peggy Babin; Sylvanie Morandais; Anita Mormand	3:26.23
High jump	Susan Jones; Great Britain	1.95 =NR	Alina Astafei; Germany	1.89	Olga Kaliturina; Russia	1.89
Pole vault	Svetlana Feofanova; Russia	4.60; CR	Janine Whitlock; Great Britain	4.34	Pavla Hamácková; Czech Republic	4.34
Long jump	Heike Drechsler; Germany	6.79	Eunice Barber; France	6.71	Fiona May; Italy	6.57
Triple jump	Tatyana Lebedeva; Russia	14.89	Natallia Safronava; Belarus	14.10w	Cristina Nicolau; Romania	13.83
Shot put	Nadine Kleinert-Schmitt; Germany	19.30	Irina Korzhanenko; Russia	19.27	Assunta Legnante; Italy	17.51
Discus throw	Franka Dietzsch; Germany	64.04	Natalya Sadova; Russia	63.77	Nicoleta Grasu; Romania	62.33
Hammer throw	Olga Tsander; Belarus	68.40	Kirsten Münchow; Germany	68.09	Lorraine Shaw; Great Britain	67.98
Javelin throw	Nikola Tomecková; Czech Republic	64.77	Steffi Nerius; Germany	63.12	Claudia Coslovich; Italy	63.07
WR world record | AR area record | CR championship record | GR games record | NR national record | OR Olympic record | PB personal best | SB season best | WL world leading (in a given season)

== First League ==
The First League was held on 23 and 24 June

=== Men ===
Group A
Held in Vaasa, Finland

Pos.	Nation	Points
1	Finland	110
2	Sweden	106
3	Czech Republic	101
4	Norway	94.5
5	Switzerland	87.5
6	Portugal	82.5
7	Belarus	77
8	Ireland	60.5

Group B
Held in Budapest, Hungary

Pos.	Nation	Points
1	Ukraine	131
2	Romania	104
3	Netherlands	97.5
4	Hungary	93.5
5	Slovenia	86
6	Slovakia	73
7	Yugoslavia	71
8	Bulgaria	60

=== Women ===
Group A
Held in Vaasa, Finland

Pos.	Nation	Points
1	Poland	122
2	Spain	106
3	Greece	101
4	Sweden	95
5	Portugal	76
6	Finland	70
7	Belgium	63
8	Lithuania	51

Group B
Held in Budapest, Hungary

Pos.	Nation	Points
1	Ukraine	119
2	Bulgaria	109
3	Netherlands	92
4	Hungary	88
5	Slovenia	83
6	Turkey	72.5
7	Austria	62
8	Yugoslavia	56.5

== Second League ==
The Second League was held on 23 and 24 June

=== Men ===
Group A
Held in Riga, Latvia

Pos.	Nation	Points
1	Denmark	141
2	Lithuania	126
3	Latvia	125
4	Estonia	120
5	Turkey	115
6	Moldova	76
7	Georgia	64
8	Luxembourg	60
9	Armenia	51

Group B
Held in Nicosia, Cyprus

Pos.	Nation	Points
1	Belgium	143
2	Austria	118
3	Croatia	105
4	Israel	93
5	Cyprus	92
6	Iceland	71
7	AASSE	47
8	Bosnia and Herzegovina	45

=== Women ===
Group A
Held in Riga, Latvia

Pos.	Nation	Points
1	Norway	136.5
2	Latvia	131
3	Ireland	129
4	Estonia	116.5
5	Denmark	115
6	Moldova	97
7	Georgia	44
8	Luxembourg	43
9	Armenia	32

Group B
Held in Nicosia, Cyprus

Pos.	Nation	Points
1	Switzerland	131
2	Slovakia	109
3	Croatia	98
4	Israel	93
5	Cyprus	86
6	Iceland	79
7	Albania	49
7	AASSE	33
