= 2000 European Athletics Indoor Championships – Men's 400 metres =

The men's 400 metres event at the 2000 European Athletics Indoor Championships was held on February 25–27.

== Medalists ==
Gold	Silver	Bronze
Iliya Dzhivondov; Bulgaria	David Canal; Spain	Marc Raquil; France

== Results ==
=== Heats ===
First 2 of each heat (Q) and the next 2 fastest (q) qualified for the semifinals.

Rank	Heat	Name	Nationality	Time	Notes
1	2	David Canal	Spain	46.80	Q
2	2	Boris Gorban	Russia	47.06	Q
3	5	Iliya Dzhivondov	Bulgaria	47.12	Q
4	3	Lars Figura	Germany	47.16	Q
5	1	Marc Raquil	France	47.18	Q
6	2	Jimisola Laursen	Sweden	47.21	q
7	3	Alain Rohr	Switzerland	47.26	Q
8	1	Andrey Semyonov	Russia	47.32	Q
9	2	Anastasios Goussis	Greece	47.35	q
9	5	Daniel Caines	Great Britain	47.35	Q
11	5	Ingo Schultz	Germany	47.43	
12	4	Stefan Holz	Germany	47.50	Q
13	1	Laurent Clerc	Switzerland	47.53	
14	5	Bruno Wavelet	France	47.54	
15	3	Periklis Iakovakis	Greece	47.61	
16	4	Philippe Bouche	France	47.67	Q
17	1	Cedric van Branteghem	Belgium	47.78	
18	2	Marcel Lopuchovský	Slovakia	47.82	
19	1	Ercan Sunu	Turkey	47.96	NR
20	5	Eduardo Iván Rodríguez	Spain	48.08	
21	1	Juan Vicente Trull	Spain	48.15	
22	4	Andreas Rechbauer	Austria	48.17	
23	4	Magnus Aare	Sweden	48.33	
24	3	Kjell Provost	Belgium	48.47	
25	4	Julien Hagen	Netherlands	48.57	
	3	Ruslan Mashchenko	Russia	DNF	

=== Semifinals ===
First 3 of each semifinals qualified directly (Q) for the final.

Rank	Heat	Name	Nationality	Time	Notes
1	2	Lars Figura	Germany	47.20	Q
2	1	David Canal	Spain	47.22	Q
3	2	Iliya Dzhivondov	Bulgaria	47.23	Q
4	1	Marc Raquil	France	47.41	Q
5	2	Alain Rohr	Switzerland	47.43	Q
6	2	Boris Gorban	Russia	47.56	
7	2	Philippe Bouche	France	47.72	
8	1	Daniel Caines	Great Britain	48.05	Q
9	2	Jimisola Laursen	Sweden	48.84	
	1	Stefan Holz	Germany	DNF	
	1	Anastasios Goussis	Greece	DNF	
	1	Andrey Semyonov	Russia	DQ	

=== Final ===
Rank	Name	Nationality	Time	Notes
1st place, gold medalist(s)	Iliya Dzhivondov	Bulgaria	46.63	
2nd place, silver medalist(s)	David Canal	Spain	46.85	
3rd place, bronze medalist(s)	Marc Raquil	France	47.28	
4	Lars Figura	Germany	47.53	
5	Alain Rohr	Switzerland	47.98	
6	Daniel Caines	Great Britain	48.36	
