= 2001 World Championships in Athletics – Men's 4 × 400 metres relay =

These are the official results of the Men's 4 × 400 metres event at the 2001 IAAF World Championships in Edmonton, Alberta, Canada. Their final was held on Sunday 12 August 2001 at 16:20h.

== Records ==
Standing records prior to the 2001 World Athletics Championships
World Record	United States (Andrew Valmon, Quincy Watts, Butch Reynolds, Michael Johnson)	2:54.29	August 22, 1993	Stuttgart, Germany
Event Record	United States (Andrew Valmon, Quincy Watts, Butch Reynolds, Michael Johnson)	2:54.29	August 22, 1993	Stuttgart, Germany
Season Best	United States "Red" (Leonard Byrd, Angelo Taylor, Jerome Young, Michael Johnson)	2:58.60	April 28, 2001	Philadelphia, United States

== Final ==
RANK	NATION	ATHLETES	TIME
	Bahamas (BAH)	• Avard Moncur • Christopher Brown • Troy McIntosh • Timothy Munnings	2:58.19
	Jamaica (JAM)	• Brandon Simpson • Christopher Williams • Gregory Haughton • Danny McFarlane	2:58.39
	Poland (POL)	• Rafał Wieruszewski • Piotr Haczek • Piotr Długosielski • Piotr Rysiukiewicz	2:59.71
4.	Brazil (BRA)	• Valdinei da Silva • Anderson Jorge dos Santos • Flávio Godoy • Sanderlei Parrela	3:01.09
5.	Great Britain (GBR)	• Iwan Thomas • Jamie Baulch • Timothy Benjamin • Mark Richardson	3:01.26
6.	Spain (ESP)	• Eduardo Iván Rodríguez • David Canal • Antonio Andrés • Antonio Manuel Reina	3:02.24
7.	Germany (GER)	• Marc Alexander Scheer • Ruwen Faller • Lars Figura • Ingo Schultz	3:03.52
	United States (USA)	• Leonard Byrd • Antonio Pettigrew • Derrick Brew • Angelo Taylor	DQ

== Heats ==
- Held on Saturday 11 August 2001

=== Heat 1 ===
RANK	NATION	ATHLETES	TIME
1.	United States (USA)	• Jerome Young • Andrew Pierce • Leonard Byrd • Derrick Brew	3:00.07
2.	Great Britain (GBR)	• Mark Hylton • Iwan Thomas • Timothy Benjamin • Mark Richardson	3:00.96
3.	Germany (GER)	• Ingo Schultz • Ruwen Faller • Marc Alexander Scheer • Lars Figura	3:01.33
4.	Spain (ESP)	• Eduardo Iván Rodríguez • David Canal • Antonio Andrés • Antonio Manuel Reina	3:01.42
5.	Japan (JPN)	• Kenji Tabata • Jun Osakada • Dai Tamesue • Ryuji Muraki	3:02.75
6.	Sweden (SWE)	• Johan Wissman • Jimisola Laursen • Mikael Jakobsson • Magnus Aare	3:04.02
7.	Canada (CAN)	• Shane Niemi • Gary Reed • Lawrence Ringwald • Jean-Marie Louis	3:04.87

=== Heat 2 ===
RANK	NATION	ATHLETES	TIME
1.	Brazil (BRA)	• Claudinei da Silva • Anderson Jorge dos Santos • Flávio Godoy • Sanderlei Parrela	3:00.75
2.	Jamaica (JAM)	• Michael Blackwood • Brandon Simpson • Mario Watts • Danny McFarlane	3:00.97
3.	France (FRA)	• Marc Raquil • Marc Foucan • Philippe Bouche • Stéphane Diagana	3:01.65
4.	Russia (RUS)	• Vitaliy Ignatov • Ruslan Mashchenko • Dmitriy Golovastov • Andrey Semyonov	3:01.95
5.	Botswana (BOT)	• Lulu Basinyi • Otukile Lekote • Johnson Kubisa • California Molefe	3:03.32
6.	Czech Republic (CZE)	• Karel Bláha • Radek Zachoval • Stepan Tesarik • Jirí Muzik	3:04.27
—	Sri Lanka (SRI)	• Rohan Pradeep Kumara • Ranga Wimalawansa • Prasanna Sampath Amarasekara • Harijan Ratnayake	DNS

=== Heat 3 ===
RANK	NATION	ATHLETES	TIME
1.	Bahamas (BAH)	• Troy McIntosh • Avard Moncur • Carl Oliver • Timothy Munnings	3:00.88
2.	Poland (POL)	• Rafał Wieruszewski • Piotr Haczek • Jacek Bocian • Piotr Rysiukiewicz	3:01.32
3.	South Africa (RSA)	• Marcus La Grange • Jopie van Oudtshoorn • Alwyn Myburgh • Arnaud Malherbe	3:01.70
4.	Ukraine (UKR)	• Oleksandr Kaydash • Andriy Tverdostup • Volodymyr Rybalka • Yevhen Zyukov	3:02.35 (NR)
5.	Mexico (MEX)	• Alejandro Cárdenas • Oscar Juanz • Roberto Carbajal • Juan Pedro Toledo	3:03.19 (NR)
6.	Saudi Arabia (KSA)	• Hamdan O. Al-Bishi • Hamed Al-Bishi • Belal Al Housah • Hadi Soua'an Al-Somaily	3:04.22
7.	Ireland (IRL)	• Robert Daly • Tom Comyns • Paul McKee • Tomas Coman	3:04.26
8.	Venezuela (VEN)	• Dany Nuñez • Simoncito Silvera • Jonathan Palma • William Hernández	3:05.37
