= Robert Maćkowiak =

Polish sprinter (born 1970)

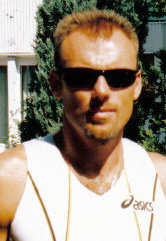
- Robert Maćkowiak in 2007.

Personal information
- Nationality: Polish
- Born: 13 May 1970 (age 56) Rawicz, Poland
- Height: 1.80 m (5 ft 11 in)
- Weight: 78 kg (172 lb)

Sport
- Sport: Athletics
- Events: 200 metres, 400 metres
Medal record
Men's Athletics
Representing Poland
Event	1st	2nd	3rd
Olympic Games	0	0	0
World Championships	1	0	1
World Indoor Championships	1	1	0
European Championships	0	2	0
European Indoor Championships	1	0	2
Total	3	3	3
World Championships
Gold medal – first place	1999 Seville	4 × 400 m relay
Bronze medal – third place	1997 Athens	4 × 400 m relay
World Indoor Championships
Gold medal – first place	2001Lisbon	4 × 400 m relay
Silver medal – second place	1999 Maebashi	4 × 400 m relay
European Championships
Silver medal – second place	1998 Budapest	400 m
Silver medal – second place	1998 Budapest	4 × 400 m relay
European Indoor Championships
Gold medal – first place	2002 Vienna	4 × 400 m relay
Bronze medal – third place	1998 Valencia	400 m
Bronze medal – third place	2002 Vienna	200 m

Robert Maćkowiak (born 13 May 1970 in Rawicz, Wielkopolskie) is a former Polish sprinter. Together with Tomasz Czubak, Jacek Bocian and Piotr Haczek he won the gold medal in 4 × 400 metres relay at the 1999 World Championships in Athletics. Maćkowiak has also won other relay medals as well as individual medals in the 200 metres and 400 metres.

He belonged to the most famous and successful Polish relay team in the 1990s together with Tomasz Czubak, Piotr Haczek and Piotr Rysiukiewicz. Numerous injuries prevented them from joining the best relays of all time. The worst disaster happened in the Olympic Games in Sydney. The Polish team was one of the favourites to win a medal (after unstoppable U.S. really there were two main rivals: Jamaica and Bahamas). On the second leg (on the first ran Rysiukiewicz) Maćkowiak was leading, but he ran into a starting box (Polish team ran on the eighth lane) and Poland lost their medal chances. The relay finished seventh in the competition. Maćkowiak also competed in the individual race in which he finished fifth.

Maćkowiak was also one of the favourites in the World Championships in Edmonton 2001). His main rival was German runner Ingo Schultz who had best times in qualification runs. Maćkowiak was a candidate for silver but he got an injury a few days before final and he lost all medal chances. He also didn't start in the relay run which took place a few days after individual start.

He officially retired at the end of the 2006 season.

== Competition record ==
Year	Competition	Venue	Position	Event	Notes
Representing Poland
1989	European Junior Championships	Varaždin, Yugoslavia	7th	200 m	21.59
1989	European Junior Championships	Varaždin, Yugoslavia	1st	4 × 100 m relay	40.00
1991	World Championships	Tokyo, Japan	9th (sf)	4 × 100 m relay	39.08
1992	European Indoor Championships	Genoa, Italy	5th	200 m	21.76
1994	European Championships	Helsinki, Finland	6th	4 × 400 m relay	3:04.22
1995	World Championships	Gothenburg, Sweden	31st (h)	200 m	20.83
1995	World Championships	Gothenburg, Sweden	5th	4 × 400 m relay	3:03.84
1996	European Indoor Championships	Stockholm, Sweden	–	200 m	DQ
1996	Olympic Games	Atlanta, United States	20th (qf)	200 m	20.61
1996	Olympic Games	Atlanta, United States	6th	4 × 400 m relay	3:00.96
1997	World Indoor Championships	Paris, France	4th	400 m	45.94
1997	World Championships	Athens, Greece	9th (qf)	400 m	45.26 (NR)
1997	World Championships	Athens, Greece	3rd	4 × 400 m relay	3:00.26
1998	European Indoor Championships	Valencia, Spain	3rd	400 m	46.00
1998	Goodwill Games	Uniondale, United States	2nd	4 × 400 m relay	2:58.00 (NR)
1998	European Championships	Budapest, Hungary	2nd	400 m	45.04
1998	European Championships	Budapest, Hungary	2nd	4 × 400 m relay	2:58.88
1999	World Indoor Championships	Maebashi, Japan	2nd	4 × 400 m relay	3:03.01 (iAR)
1999	World Championships	Seville, Spain	9th (qf)	400 m	45.23
1999	World Championships	Seville, Spain	1st	4 × 400 m relay	2:58.91
2000	Olympic Games	Sydney, Australia	5th	400 m	45.14
2000	Olympic Games	Sydney, Australia	7th	4 × 400 m relay	3:03.22
2001	World Indoor Championships	Lisbon, Portugal	15th (h)	400 m	47.24
2001	World Indoor Championships	Lisbon, Portugal	1st	4 × 400 m relay	3:04.47
2001	World Championships	Edmonton, Canada	3rd (sf)	400 m	44.84
2002	European Indoor Championships	Vienna, Austria	3rd	200 m	20.77
2002	European Indoor Championships	Vienna, Austria	1st	4 × 400 m relay	3:05.50
2002	European Championships	Munich, Germany	–	4 × 400 m relay	DQ
2005	European Indoor Championships	Madrid, Spain	–	4 × 400 m relay	DQ
2005	World Championships	Helsinki, Finland	5th	4 × 400 m relay	3:00.58

== Personal bests ==
Outdoor

- 200 metres - 20.61 s (1996)
- 400 metres - 44.84 s (2001)

Indoor

- 200 metres - 20.68 s (2002)
- 400 metres - 45.94 s (1997)

== See also ==
- Polish records in athletics
