= 1999 European Athletics U23 Championships – Men's 400 metres =

The men's 400 metres event at the 1999 European Athletics U23 Championships was held in Gothenburg, Sweden, at Ullevi on 29, 30, and 31 July 1999.

== Medalists ==
| Gold | Piotr Haczek; Poland |
| Silver | Zsolt Szeglet; Hungary |
| Bronze | Marc Raquil; France |

== Results ==
=== Final ===
31 July

| Rank | Name | Nationality | Time | Notes |
|---|---|---|---|---|
| 1st place, gold medalist(s) | Piotr Haczek | Poland | 45.78 | |
| 2nd place, silver medalist(s) | Zsolt Szeglet | Hungary | 46.09 | |
| 3rd place, bronze medalist(s) | Marc Raquil | France | 46.18 | |
| 4 | Geoff Dearman | United Kingdom | 46.49 | |
| 5 | David Canal | Spain | 46.57 | |
| 6 | Marcel Lopuchovský | Slovakia | 46.62 | |
| 7 | Maik Liebe | Germany | 47.08 | |
| 8 | Jimisola Laursen | Sweden | 47.15 | |

=== Semifinals ===
30 July
Qualified: first 4 in each to the Final

==== Semifinal 1 ====
| Rank | Name | Nationality | Time | Notes |
|---|---|---|---|---|
| 1 | Marc Raquil | France | 45.93 | Q |
| 2 | Marcel Lopuchovský | Slovakia | 45.95 | Q |
| 3 | Jimisola Laursen | Sweden | 46.04 | Q |
| 4 | Maik Liebe | Germany | 46.20 | Q |
| 5 | David Naismith | United Kingdom | 46.27 | |
| 6 | Anastasios Gousis | Greece | 46.61 | |
| 7 | Michał Węglarski | Poland | 46.69 | |
| 8 | Adrián Fernández | Spain | 47.73 | |

==== Semifinal 2 ====
| Rank | Name | Nationality | Time | Notes |
|---|---|---|---|---|
| 1 | Piotr Haczek | Poland | 46.09 | Q |
| 2 | Zsolt Szeglet | Hungary | 46.13 | Q |
| 3 | Geoff Dearman | United Kingdom | 46.34 | Q |
| 4 | David Canal | Spain | 46.46 | Q |
| 5 | Piotr Długosielski | Poland | 46.78 | |
| 6 | Kjell Provost | Belgium | 46.94 | |
| 7 | Sebastian Debnar-Daumler | Germany | 47.41 | |
| 8 | Damien Grosso | France | 48.05 | |

=== Heats ===
29 July
Qualified: first 3 in each heat and 4 best to the Semifinal

==== Heat 1 ====
| Rank | Name | Nationality | Time | Notes |
|---|---|---|---|---|
| 1 | Marc Raquil | France | 46.54 | Q |
| 2 | Jimisola Laursen | Sweden | 46.57 | Q |
| 3 | David Naismith | United Kingdom | 46.83 | Q |
| 4 | Sebastian Debnar-Daumler | Germany | 47.21 | q |
| 5 | Jan Hanzl | Czech Republic | 47.75 | |
| 6 | Roald Bergheim | Norway | 48.15 | |
| 7 | Antonis Ayiomamitis | Cyprus | 49.50 | |

==== Heat 2 ====
| Rank | Name | Nationality | Time | Notes |
|---|---|---|---|---|
| 1 | David Canal | Spain | 46.45 | Q |
| 2 | Maik Liebe | Germany | 46.66 | Q |
| 3 | Piotr Długosielski | Poland | 46.86 | Q |
| 4 | Paul McKee | Ireland | 47.33 | |
| 5 | Rikkert van Rhee | Netherlands | 47.36 | |
| 6 | Goran Gajović | Yugoslavia | 47.50 | |
| 7 | Lee Calderon | Gibraltar | 52.40 | |
| | Jacob Stafstedt | Sweden | DQ | |

==== Heat 3 ====
| Rank | Name | Nationality | Time | Notes |
|---|---|---|---|---|
| 1 | Marcel Lopuchovský | Slovakia | 46.52 | Q |
| 2 | Piotr Haczek | Poland | 46.56 | Q |
| 3 | Kjell Provost | Belgium | 46.57 | Q |
| 4 | Anastasios Gousis | Greece | 46.78 | q |
| 5 | Loïc Lerouge | France | 47.70 | |
| 6 | Luis Flores | Spain | 48.52 | |
| 7 | Edoardo Vallet | Italy | 48.69 | |
| | Ercan Sunu | Turkey | DNF | |

==== Heat 4 ====
| Rank | Name | Nationality | Time | Notes |
|---|---|---|---|---|
| 1 | Geoff Dearman | United Kingdom | 46.73 | Q |
| 2 | Zsolt Szeglet | Hungary | 46.83 | Q |
| 3 | Michał Węglarski | Poland | 46.84 | Q |
| 4 | Adrián Fernández | Spain | 47.19 | q |
| 5 | Damien Grosso | France | 47.25 | q |
| 6 | Marcel Knospe | Germany | 47.29 | |
| 7 | Pedro Tubal | Portugal | 47.78 | |
| 8 | Pavel Jelínek | Czech Republic | 48.37 | |

== Participation ==
According to an unofficial count, 31 athletes from 20 countries participated in the event.

- Belgium (1)
- Cyprus (1)
- Czech Republic (2)
- France (3)
- Germany (3)
- Gibraltar (1)
- Greece (1)
- Hungary (1)
- Ireland (1)
- Italy (1)
- Netherlands (1)
- Norway (1)
- Poland (3)
- Portugal (1)
- Slovakia (1)
- Spain (3)
- Sweden (2)
- Turkey (1)
- United Kingdom (2)
- Yugoslavia (1)
