= 1996 World Junior Championships in Athletics – Men's 400 metres hurdles =

The men's 400 metres hurdles event at the 1996 World Junior Championships in Athletics was held in Sydney, Australia, at International Athletic Centre on 21, 22 and 23 August.

== Medalists ==
Gold	Mubarak Al-Nubi; Qatar
Silver	Llewellyn Herbert; South Africa
Bronze	Angelo Taylor; United States

== Results ==
=== Final ===
23 August

Rank	Name	Nationality	Time	Notes
1st place, gold medalist(s)	Mubarak Al-Nubi	Qatar	49.07	
2nd place, silver medalist(s)	Llewellyn Herbert	South Africa	49.15	
3rd place, bronze medalist(s)	Angelo Taylor	United States	50.18	
4	Kjell Provost	Belgium	51.11	
5	Marcel Lopuchovský	Slovakia	51.16	
6	Alexandre Marchand	Canada	51.29	
7	Willie Smith	Namibia	51.83	
8	Isaac Magut	Kenya	52.00	

=== Semifinals ===
22 August

==== Semifinal 1 ====
Rank	Name	Nationality	Time	Notes
1	Mubarak Al-Nubi	Qatar	50.99	Q
2	Kjell Provost	Belgium	51.15	Q
3	Alexandre Marchand	Canada	51.37	Q
4	Marcel Lopuchovský	Slovakia	51.68	Q
5	Marians Zigmunds	Latvia	51.94	
6	Francesco Filisetti	Italy	52.02	
7	Juan Labuschagne	South Africa	52.27	
8	John McAfee	United States	53.78	

==== Semifinal 2 ====
Rank	Name	Nationality	Time	Notes
1	Llewellyn Herbert	South Africa	50.38	Q
2	Isaac Magut	Kenya	51.22	Q
3	Angelo Taylor	United States	51.43	Q
4	Willie Smith	Namibia	51.60	Q
5	Boris Gorban	Russia	52.20	
6	Tan Chunhua	China	52.36	
7	Andrew Laverick	Australia	53.39	
8	Boris Vazovan	Slovakia	55.09	

=== Heats ===
21 August

==== Heat 1 ====
Rank	Name	Nationality	Time	Notes
1	Llewellyn Herbert	South Africa	51.70	Q
2	Boris Vazovan	Slovakia	52.06	Q
3	Francesco Filisetti	Italy	52.11	q
4	Willie Smith	Namibia	52.14	q
5	Kurt Duncan	Jamaica	53.10	
6	Lin Chin-Fu	Chinese Taipei	53.25	
7	Samy Barka	France	53.32	
8	Kuripitone Betham	Western Samoa	57.49	

==== Heat 2 ====
Rank	Name	Nationality	Time	Notes
1	John McAfee	United States	52.05	Q
2	Kjell Provost	Belgium	52.16	Q
3	Filip Faems	Belgium	52.37	
4	Charles Robertson-Adams	United Kingdom	52.91	
5	Mark Edmond	New Zealand	53.07	
6	Thomas Janota	Germany	53.81	
7	Atle McAdam	Norway	53.83	
8	Crespin Adanguidi	Benin	56.87	

==== Heat 3 ====
Rank	Name	Nationality	Time	Notes
1	Marcel Lopuchovský	Slovakia	52.20	Q
2	Boris Gorban	Russia	52.72	Q
3	Peter Poles	Slovenia	52.81	
4	Ken Yoshizawa	Japan	53.10	
5	Mark Rowlands	United Kingdom	53.63	
6	Daniel Gómez	Andorra	53.77	
7	Cristiano Moura	Brazil	53.87	
8	Jaime Juan	Spain	53.89	

==== Heat 4 ====
Rank	Name	Nationality	Time	Notes
1	Marians Zigmunds	Latvia	51.71	Q
2	Isaac Magut	Kenya	51.76	Q
3	Tan Chunhua	China	51.90	q
4	Juan Labuschagne	South Africa	51.96	q
5	Jun Iwasaki	Japan	54.32	
6	Leonid Vershinin	Belarus	54.50	
7	Siong Chuin Cheong	Malaysia	54.71	
8	Robson dos Santos	Brazil	57.38	

==== Heat 5 ====
Rank	Name	Nationality	Time	Notes
1	Mubarak Al-Nubi	Qatar	51.95	Q
2	Alexandre Marchand	Canada	52.41	Q
3	Peter Bate	Australia	52.47	
4	Cédric El-Idrissi	Switzerland	52.75	
5	Chen Tien-Wen	Chinese Taipei	52.92	
6	Mads Mikkelsen	Denmark	53.33	
7	Zahr-el-Din El-Najem	Syria	55.32	
8		Sri Lanka	DNF	

==== Heat 6 ====
Rank	Name	Nationality	Time	Notes
1	Angelo Taylor	United States	51.98	Q
2	Andrew Laverick	Australia	52.14	Q
3	Alexander Mena	Colombia	52.27	
4	Frank Peeters	Netherlands	52.62	
5	Erick Talu	Estonia	52.84	
6	Stefan Bönisch	Germany	53.06	
7	Brian Liddy	Ireland	53.49	
8	Francesco Sartore	Italy	54.00	

== Participation ==
According to an unofficial count, 48 athletes from 36 countries participated in the event.

- Andorra (1)
- Australia (2)
- Belarus (1)
- Belgium (2)
- Benin (1)
- Brazil (2)
- Canada (1)
- China (1)
- Chinese Taipei (2)
- Colombia (1)
- Denmark (1)
- Estonia (1)
- France (1)
- Germany (2)
- Ireland (1)
- Italy (2)
- Jamaica (1)
- Japan (2)
- Kenya (1)
- Latvia (1)
- Malaysia (1)
- Namibia (1)
- Netherlands (1)
- New Zealand (1)
- Norway (1)
- Qatar (1)
- Russia (2)
- Slovakia (2)
- Slovenia (1)
- Sri Lanka (1)
- South Africa (2)
- Spain (1)
- Switzerland (1)
- Syria (1)
- United Kingdom (2)
- United States (2)
- Western Samoa (1)
