= 1997 IAAF World Indoor Championships – Men's 400 metres =

The men's 400 metres event at the 1997 IAAF World Indoor Championships was held on March 7–9.

== Medalists ==
| Gold | Silver | Bronze |
|---|---|---|
| Sunday Bada; Nigeria | Jamie Baulch; Great Britain | Shunji Karube; Japan |

== Results ==
=== Heats ===
First 2 of each heat (Q) and next 4 fastest (q) qualified for the semifinals.

| Rank | Heat | Name | Nationality | Time | Notes |
|---|---|---|---|---|---|
| 1 | 1 | Jamie Baulch | Great Britain | 46.52 | Q |
| 2 | 2 | Sunday Bada | Nigeria | 46.58 | Q |
| 3 | 1 | Troy McIntosh | Bahamas | 46.59 | Q |
| 4 | 2 | Robert Maćkowiak | Poland | 46.64 | Q, SB |
| 5 | 1 | Mathias Rusterholz | Switzerland | 46.65 | q |
| 6 | 3 | Sanderlei Parrela | Brazil | 46.84 | Q, AR |
| 7 | 5 | Ruslan Mashchenko | Russia | 46.90 | Q |
| 8 | 5 | Kjell Provost | Belgium | 46.94 | Q |
| 9 | 5 | Shunji Karube | Japan | 47.08 | q |
| 10 | 4 | Derek Mills | United States | 47.10 | Q |
| 11 | 1 | Shigekazu Ōmori | Japan | 47.13 | q, PB |
| 12 | 2 | Antonio Andrés | Spain | 47.14 | q, PB |
| 13 | 4 | Linval Laird | Jamaica | 47.18 | Q |
| 14 | 5 | Ibrahim Ismail Muftah | Qatar | 47.32 | |
| 15 | 4 | Slobodan Branković | Yugoslavia | 47.42 | |
| 16 | 3 | Marco Vaccari | Italy | 47.56 | Q |
| 17 | 6 | Alejandro Cárdenas | Mexico | 47.57 | Q |
| 18 | 7 | Mark Hylton | Great Britain | 47.58 | Q |
| 19 | 7 | Deon Minor | United States | 47.61 | Q |
| 20 | 7 | Siniša Peša | Yugoslavia | 47.64 | |
| 21 | 7 | Pierre-Marie Hilaire | France | 47.68 | |
| 22 | 3 | Valentin Kulbatskiy | Ukraine | 47.76 | |
| 23 | 6 | Dusán Kovács | Hungary | 47.81 | Q |
| 23 | 7 | Kevin Widmer | Switzerland | 47.81 | |
| 25 | 4 | Vadim Zadoynov | Moldova | 48.18 | |
| 26 | 6 | Valdinei da Silva | Brazil | 48.19 | |
| 27 | 2 | Péter Nyilasi | Hungary | 48.21 | |
| 28 | 3 | Erasto Sampson | Saint Vincent and the Grenadines | 48.26 | |
| 29 | 5 | Carlos José Toledo | El Salvador | 49.23 | |
| 30 | 1 | Pablo Escriba | Spain | 49.90 | |
| 31 | 6 | Emmanuel Rubayiza | Rwanda | 50.25 | SB |
| 32 | 3 | Mandiaye Seck | Mauritania | 51.70 | |
| 33 | 7 | Mike Ezra | Uganda | 53.74 | |
| | 2 | Davis Kamoga | Uganda | DNS | |
| | 3 | Michael McDonald | Jamaica | DNS | |
| | 4 | Clement Chukwu | Nigeria | DNS | |
| | 4 | Mahdi Moullai | Iran | DNS | |
| | 5 | Neil de Silva | Trinidad and Tobago | DNS | |
| | 6 | Greg Haughton | Jamaica | DNS | |
| | 6 | Kenmore Hughes | Antigua and Barbuda | DNS | |

=== Semifinals ===
First 2 of each semifinal (Q) qualified directly for the final.

| Rank | Heat | Name | Nationality | Time | Notes |
|---|---|---|---|---|---|
| 1 | 1 | Jamie Baulch | Great Britain | 46.02 | Q |
| 2 | 2 | Sunday Bada | Nigeria | 46.06 | Q, SB |
| 3 | 2 | Derek Mills | United States | 46.14 | Q |
| 4 | 3 | Shunji Karube | Japan | 46.16 | Q, NR |
| 5 | 2 | Mark Hylton | Great Britain | 46.19 | |
| 6 | 1 | Troy McIntosh | Bahamas | 46.20 | Q, NR |
| 7 | 3 | Robert Maćkowiak | Poland | 46.22 | Q, SB |
| 8 | 3 | Sanderlei Parrela | Brazil | 46.33 | AR |
| 9 | 3 | Ruslan Mashchenko | Russia | 46.42 | |
| 10 | 1 | Alejandro Cárdenas | Mexico | 46.50 | |
| 11 | 1 | Deon Minor | United States | 46.68 | |
| 12 | 2 | Linval Laird | Jamaica | 47.01 | |
| 13 | 3 | Mathias Rusterholz | Switzerland | 47.16 | |
| 14 | 2 | Dusán Kovács | Hungary | 47.23 | |
| 15 | 2 | Shigekazu Ōmori | Japan | 47.34 | |
| 16 | 1 | Marco Vaccari | Italy | 47.54 | |
| 17 | 1 | Antonio Andrés | Spain | 47.71 | |
| 18 | 3 | Kjell Provost | Belgium | 48.30 | |

=== Final ===
| Rank | Name | Nationality | Time | Notes |
|---|---|---|---|---|
| 1st place, gold medalist(s) | Sunday Bada | Nigeria | 45.51 | AR |
| 2nd place, silver medalist(s) | Jamie Baulch | Great Britain | 45.62 | |
| 3rd place, bronze medalist(s) | Shunji Karube | Japan | 45.76 | AR |
| 4 | Robert Maćkowiak | Poland | 45.94 | SB |
| 5 | Derek Mills | United States | 46.30 | |
| | Troy McIntosh | Bahamas | DNF | |
