= Jimisola Laursen =

Swedish sprinter

Jimisola Andreas Laursen (born 13 July 1977 in Malmö) is a retired Swedish sprinter who specialised in the 400 metres. He represented his country at three consecutive World Championships, starting in 2001 where he reached the semifinals. In addition, he won the silver medal at the 2002 European Indoor Championships.

Laursen today works as First Officer for Scandinavian Airlines.

== Competition record ==
Year	Competition	Venue	Position	Event	Notes
Representing Sweden
1996	World Junior Championships	Sydney, Australia	16th (sf)	400 m	47.79
1997	European U23 Championships	Turku, Finland	5th	400 m	46.48
1997	European U23 Championships	Turku, Finland	6th	4x400 m relay	3:07.27
1999	European U23 Championships	Gothenburg, Sweden	8th	400 m	47.15
2000	European Indoor Championships	Ghent, Belgium	9th (sf)	400 m	48.84
2001	World Indoor Championships	Lisbon, Portugal	11th (sf)	400 m	48.17
2001	World Championships	Edmonton, Canada	15th (sf)	400 m	45.62
2001	World Championships	Edmonton, Canada	16th (h)	4x400 m relay	3:04.02
2002	European Indoor Championships	Vienna, Austria	2nd	400 m	45.59
2003	World Championships	Paris, France	22nd (h)	400 m	45.87
2005	World Championships	Helsinki, Finland	14th (h)	4x400 m relay	3:03.62

== Personal bests ==
Outdoor

- 100 metres – 10.73 (Vellinge 2001)
- 200 metres – 21.10 (+0.6 m/s) (St. Martin 2002)
- 400 metres – 45.54 (Edmonton 2001)

Indoor

- 60 metres – 6.83 (Malmö 2004)
- 200 metres – 21.14 (Malmö 2002)
- 400 metres – 45.59 (Vienna 2002) NR
