= 2001 IAAF World Indoor Championships – Men's 4 × 400 metres relay =

The men's 4 × 400 metres relay event at the 2001 IAAF World Indoor Championships was held on March 10–11.

== Medalists ==
Gold	Silver	Bronze
Poland; Piotr Rysiukiewicz; Piotr Haczek; Jacek Bocian; Robert Maćkowiak	Russia; Aleksandr Ladeyshchikov; Ruslan Mashchenko; Boris Gorban; Andrey Semyonov; Dmitriy Forshev*	Jamaica; Michael McDonald; Davian Clarke; Michael Blackwood; Danny McFarlane; Gregory Haughton*

* Runners who participated in the heats only and received medals.

Note: The United States originally won the silver medal, but were disqualified after Jerome Young admitted to the use of banned substances.

== Results ==
=== Heats ===
Qualification: First 2 teams of each heat (Q) and the next 2 fastest (q) advance to the final.

Rank	Heat	Nation	Athletes	Time	Notes
1	1	Poland	Piotr Rysiukiewicz, Piotr Haczek, Jacek Bocian, Robert Maćkowiak	3:06.33	Q
2	1	Great Britain	Matthew Elias, Paul Slythe, Mark Brown, Du'aine Ladejo	3:07.57	q
3	2	Russia	Aleksandr Ladeyshchikov, Ruslan Mashchenko, Dmitriy Forshev, Andrey Semyonov	3:08.14	Q
4	2	Jamaica	Michael McDonald, Davian Clarke, Michael Blackwood, Greg Haughton	3:08.29	Q
5	2	Nigeria	Jude Monye, Fidelis Gadzama, Sunday Bada, Enefiok Udo-Obong	3:09.76	q, NR
6	2	Greece	Georgios Ikonomidis, Dimitrios Giepos, Georgios Doupis, Stilianos Dimotsios	3:10.16	NR
7	1	Kuwait	Khaled Atiq Al-Johar, Bader Al-Felei, Mechel Al-Harbi, Fawzi Al-Shammari	3:14.14	NR
	1	United States	James Davis, Leonard Byrd, Jerome Young, Trinity Gray	DQ	

=== Final ===
Rank	Nation	Competitors	Time	Notes
1st place, gold medalist(s)	Poland	Piotr Rysiukiewicz, Piotr Haczek, Jacek Bocian, Robert Maćkowiak	3:04.47	WL
2nd place, silver medalist(s)	Russia	Aleksandr Ladeyshchikov, Ruslan Mashchenko, Boris Gorban, Andrey Semyonov	3:04.82	NR
3rd place, bronze medalist(s)	Jamaica	Michael McDonald, Davian Clarke, Michael Blackwood, Danny McFarlane	3:05.45	
4	Great Britain	Mark Hylton, Du'aine Ladejo, Matthew Elias, Daniel Caines	3:09.21	
5	Nigeria	Jude Monye, Fidelis Gadzama, Sunday Bada, Enefiok Udo-Obong	3:16.53	
	United States	Milton Campbell, Leonard Byrd, Trinity Gray, Jerome Young	DQ	
