= 1997 European Athletics U23 Championships – Men's 400 metres =

The men's 400 metres event at the 1997 European Athletics U23 Championships was held in Turku, Finland, on 10, 11 and 12 July 1997.

== Medalists ==
| Gold | Mark Hylton; Great Britain |
| Silver | Piotr Haczek; Poland |
| Bronze | Kjell Provost; Belgium |

== Results ==
=== Final ===
12 July

| Rank | Name | Nationality | Time | Notes |
|---|---|---|---|---|
| 1st place, gold medalist(s) | Mark Hylton | Great Britain | 45.71 | |
| 2nd place, silver medalist(s) | Piotr Haczek | Poland | 45.72 | |
| 3rd place, bronze medalist(s) | Kjell Provost | Belgium | 45.99 | |
| 4 | Quincy Douglas | Norway | 46.47 | |
| 5 | Jimisola Laursen | Sweden | 46.48 | |
| 6 | Richard Knowles | Great Britain | 46.63 | |
| 7 | Carlos Gachanja | Germany | 46.80 | |
| 8 | Piotr Długosielski | Poland | 46.91 | |

=== Semifinals ===
11 July
Qualified: first 4 in each to the Final

==== Semifinal 1 ====
| Rank | Name | Nationality | Time | Notes |
|---|---|---|---|---|
| 1 | Mark Hylton | Great Britain | 46.25 | Q |
| 2 | Jimisola Laursen | Sweden | 46.69 | Q |
| 3 | Piotr Haczek | Poland | 46.70 | Q |
| 4 | Carlos Gachanja | Germany | 46.91 | Q |
| 5 | Andriy Tverdostup | Ukraine | 47.30 | |
| 6 | Robert Loubli | France | 47.38 | |
| 7 | Zsolt Szeglet | Hungary | 47.74 | |
| 8 | Alessandro Bracciali | Italy | 48.68 | |

==== Semifinal 2 ====
| Rank | Name | Nationality | Time | Notes |
|---|---|---|---|---|
| 1 | Kjell Provost | Belgium | 46.82 | Q |
| 2 | Quincy Douglas | Norway | 46.93 | Q |
| 3 | Piotr Długosielski | Poland | 47.17 | Q |
| 4 | Richard Knowles | Great Britain | 47.44 | Q |
| 5 | Tommi Hartonen | Finland | 47.55 | |
| 6 | Walter Pirovano | Italy | 47.60 | |
| 7 | Jan Štejfa | Czech Republic | 47.62 | |
| | Boštjan Horvat | Slovenia | DQ | |

=== Heats ===
10 July
Qualified: first 4 in each heat and 4 best to the Semifinal

==== Heat 1 ====
| Rank | Name | Nationality | Time | Notes |
|---|---|---|---|---|
| 1 | Kjell Provost | Belgium | 46.53 | Q |
| 2 | Quincy Douglas | Norway | 47.21 | Q |
| 3 | Piotr Długosielski | Poland | 47.40 | Q |
| 4 | Zsolt Szeglet | Hungary | 47.41 | Q |
| 5 | Alessandro Bracciali | Italy | 47.88 | q |
| 6 | Johan Lannefors | Sweden | 48.02 | |
| 7 | Oleg Kovalyov | Russia | 48.38 | |

==== Heat 2 ====
| Rank | Name | Nationality | Time | Notes |
|---|---|---|---|---|
| 1 | Mark Hylton | Great Britain | 47.05 | Q |
| 2 | Jimisola Laursen | Sweden | 47.22 | Q |
| 3 | Piotr Haczek | Poland | 47.27 | Q |
| 4 | Robert Loubli | France | 47.66 | Q |
| 5 | Andriy Tverdostup | Ukraine | 47.78 | q |
| 6 | Boštjan Horvat | Slovenia | 47.95 | q |
| 7 | Georgios Batsikas | Greece | 48.93 | |

==== Heat 3 ====
| Rank | Name | Nationality | Time | Notes |
|---|---|---|---|---|
| 1 | Richard Knowles | Great Britain | 47.05 | Q |
| 2 | Jan Štejfa | Czech Republic | 47.17 | Q |
| 3 | Carlos Gachanja | Germany | 47.18 | Q |
| 4 | Walter Pirovano | Italy | 47.44 | Q |
| 5 | Tommi Hartonen | Finland | 47.68 | q |
| 6 | Rostislav Mestechkin | Ukraine | 48.27 | |

== Participation ==
According to an unofficial count, 20 athletes from 15 countries participated in the event.

- Belgium (1)
- Czech Republic (1)
- Finland (1)
- France (1)
- Germany (1)
- Great Britain (2)
- Greece (1)
- Hungary (1)
- Italy (2)
- Norway (1)
- Poland (2)
- Russia (1)
- Slovenia (1)
- Sweden (2)
- Ukraine (2)
