= 1997 European Athletics U23 Championships – Men's 4 × 400 metres relay =

The men's 4 x 400 metres relay event at the 1997 European Athletics U23 Championships was held in Turku, Finland, on 12 and 13 July 1997.

== Medalists ==
Gold	Ryszard Pilarczyk; Piotr Długosielski; Jacek Bocian; Piotr Haczek; Poland
Silver	David Nikodým; Lukáš Souček; Jan Štejfa; Jiří Mužík; Czech Republic
Bronze	Thomas Goller; Maik Liebe; Lars Figura; Carlos Gachanja; Germany

== Results ==
=== Final ===
13 July

Rank	Nation	Competitors	Time	Notes
1st place, gold medalist(s)	Poland	Ryszard Pilarczyk; Piotr Długosielski; Jacek Bocian; Piotr Haczek	3:03.07	
2nd place, silver medalist(s)	Czech Republic	David Nikodým; Lukáš Souček; Jan Štejfa; Jiří Mužík	3:04.13	
3rd place, bronze medalist(s)	Germany	Thomas Goller; Maik Liebe; Lars Figura; Carlos Gachanja	3:04.32	
4	France	Xavier Ravenet; Philippe Bouche; Marc Raquil; Robert Loubli	3:04.80	
5	Great Britain	Clayton Archer; Richard Knowles; Nick Budden; Mark Hylton	3:05.77	
6	Sweden	Ruben Norlin; Johan Lannefors; Björn Engström; Jimisola Laursen	3:07.27	
7	Italy	Domenico Rao; Andrea Longo; Alessandro Attene; Walter Pirovano	3:08.00	
8	Finland	Jouni Haatainen; Kim Meller; Timo Niemelä; Petri Pohjonen	3:15.02	

=== Heats ===
12 July
Qualified: first 3 in each heat and 2 best to the Final

==== Heat 1 ====
Rank	Nation	Competitors	Time	Notes
1	Germany	Ulrich Schnorrenberger; Sebastian Aryee; Lars Figura; Maik Liebe	3:09.57	Q
2	Poland	Jacek Bocian; Bartosz Gruman; Piotr Długosielski; Piotr Haczek	3:10.10	Q
3	Sweden	Klas Ringdahl; Ruben Norlin; Björn Engström; Johan Lannefors	3:10.19	Q
4	Italy	Lorenzo Franculli; Marco Cagnazzi; Domenico Rao; Walter Pirovano	3:10.55	q
5	Finland	Jouni Haatainen; Kim Meller; Timo Niemelä; Petri Pohjonen	3:11.18	q

==== Heat 2 ====
Rank	Nation	Competitors	Time	Notes
1	France	Marc Raquil; Pascal Lucéa; Philippe Bouche; Robert Loubli	3:07.93	Q
2	Czech Republic	David Nikodým; Lukáš Souček; Jan Štejfa; Jiří Mužík	3:09.04	Q
3	Great Britain	Clayton Archer; Geoff Dearman; Nick Budden; Mark Hylton	3:12.17	Q
4	Ukraine	Vladimír Rybalka; Andriy Tverdostup; Sergey Kosenko; Rostislav Mestechkin	3:12.37	

== Participation ==
According to an unofficial count, 44 athletes from 9 countries participated in the event.

- Czech Republic (4)
- Finland (4)
- France (5)
- Germany (6)
- Great Britain (5)
- Italy (6)
- Poland (5)
- Sweden (5)
- Ukraine (4)
