= 1990 South American Youth Championships in Athletics =

X South American Youth Championships in Athletics
- Dates: November 22–24
- Host city: Lima, Peru
- Level: Youth
- Events: 37
- Participation: about 196 athletes from 10 nations

The 10th South American Youth Championships in Athletics were held in Lima, Peru, between November 22 and 24, 1990.

== Medal summary ==
Medal winners are published for boys and girls. Complete results can be found on the "World Junior Athletics History" website.

=== Men ===
Event	Gold		Silver		Bronze	
100 metres (wind: +0.1 m/s)	Pablo Cavero (CHI)	10.5	Pablo Almeida (CHI)	10.9	Iñaki Godoy (PER)	10.9
200 metres (wind: +0.2 m/s)	Pablo Cavero (CHI)	21.8	Pablo Almeida (CHI)	22.3	Nelson Rodrigues (BRA)	23.0
400 metres	Nelson López (ARG)	49.6	Sanderlei Parrela (BRA)	50.3	Alexander Melo (BRA)	51.7
800 metres	Vanderlei Soares (BRA)	1:56.3	Fábio Rogério (BRA)	1:56.3	Víctor Cruz (CHI)	1:57.3
1500 metres	Mariano Tarilo (ARG)	4:05.1	Joelson Dias (BRA)	4:05.6	Raimundo Alcino (BRA)	4:05.7
5000 metres	Elías Bastos (BRA)	15:06.1	Jorge Chávez (PER)	15:07.7	Mariano Tarilo (ARG)	15:18.4
1500 metres steeplechase	Eduardo Monge (CHI)	4:22.83	Marcelo Blanco (BRA)	4:24.80	Mariano Tarilo (ARG)	4:26.76
110 metres hurdles (wind: +0.1 m/s)	Maximiliano Alfaro (CHI)	13.9	Gabriel Corradini (ARG)	14.1	Carlos Correa (CHI)	14.4
300 metres hurdles	José dos Santos (BRA)	38.8	Gabriel Corradini (ARG)	39.3	Javier Verme (PER)	39.4
High jump	Marcelo Miranda (BRA)	2.00	Mario León (PER)	1.97	Marcos dos Santos (BRA)	1.97
Pole vault	Genivaldo Meira (BRA)	4.00	Gerardo Ríos (CHI)	3.80	Israel Morán (PER)	3.60
Long jump	Márcio da Cruz (BRA)	7.26	Vinicius Barroso (BRA)	6.77	Maximiliano Alfaro (CHI)	6.76
Triple jump	Márcio da Cruz (BRA)	15.83	Mario León (PER)	13.99	José dos Santos (BRA)	13.82
Shot put	Hugo Scévola (ARG)	15.71	Adriano Souza (BRA)	15.13	Márcio da Cruz (BRA)	15.03
Discus throw	Julio Piñero (ARG)	48.52	Fábio Ribeiro (BRA)	45.22	Leandro Teixeira (BRA)	44.48
Hammer throw	Hugo Scévola (ARG)	64.90	Javier Álvarez (ARG)	58.68	Eberton Giacomelli (BRA)	45.74
Javelin throw	Ariel Martínez (ARG)	56.70	Fábio de Souza (BRA)	54.12	Julio Piñero (ARG)	51.70
Hexathlon	Moisés Pereira (BRA)	3975	Mario Caorlín (ARG)	3477	Alejandro Cordobés (ARG)	3390
5000 metres track walk	Jefferson Pérez (ECU)	19:49.54	João Sendeski (BRA)	22:16.57	Jaime Rodríguez (COL)	22:35.62
4 × 100 metres relay	Chile; Oscar Cavero; Pablo Almeida; Rodrigo Schmidt; Maximiliano Alfaro	42.37	Brazil; Silvio de Moraes; Nelson Rodrigues; Jair Moreira; Vinicius Barroso	43.58	Peru; Iñaki Godoy; Marco Carrasco; Franco Pedraz; Javier Verne	43.78
4 × 400 metres relay	Chile; Cristian Ihlo; Pablo Almeida; Oscar Cavero; Carlos Sandoval	3:22.2	Brazil; Sanderlei Parrela; Alexander Melo; José dos Santos; Edmar Silva	3:24.0	Peru; Javier Verne; Erick Cuadros; Marco Carrasco; Iñaki Godoy	3:28.8

=== Women ===
Event	Gold		Silver		Bronze	
100 metres (wind: +0.2 m/s)	Lisette Rondón (CHI)	12.18	Hannelore Grosser (CHI)	12.39	Gilda Massa (PER)	12.46
200 metres (wind: +0.0 m/s)	Lisette Rondón (CHI)	25.4	Hannelore Grosser (CHI)	25.5	Verónica Klingerberger (PER)	26.0
400 metres	Janeth Lucumí (COL)	58.18	Viviana Chiozza (ARG)	58.39	Mayra Carchi (ECU)	58.80
800 metres	Janeth Caizalitín (ECU)	2:14.7	Ana de Oliveira (BRA)	2:17.3	Paola López (ARG)	2:17.9
1500 metres	Janeth Caizalitín (ECU)	4:32.5	Carmen Naranjo (ECU)	4:37.5	Ana de Oliveira (BRA)	4:39.0
3000 metres	Janeth Caizalitín (ECU)	9:44.34	Carmen Naranjo (ECU)	9:45.33	Maria da Conceição (BRA)	9:54.54
100 metres hurdles (wind: +0.1 m/s)	Gilda Massa (PER)	14.58	Marília de Souza (BRA)	14.76	Claudia Casals (ARG)	15.33
High jump	Soledad Harambour (CHI)	1.68	Ximena Guzmán (PER); Carolina Tovar (PAR)	1.68		
Long jump	Lucimar de Moura (BRA)	5.81	Lilia Aguirre (ARG)	5.80	Claudia Valle (CHI)	5.52
Shot put	Margit Wahlbrink (BRA)	12.52	Marisol Bengoa (CHI)	10.72	Natalia Parra (ARG)	10.54
Discus throw	Erika Melián (ARG)	38.96	Carla Campos (PER)	34.40	Marisol Bengoa (CHI)	34.26
Javelin throw	Zuleima Araméndiz (COL)	41.22	Zoila Ayala (PAR)	39.26	Marisa de Almeida (BRA)	38.32
Pentathlon	Marcela Savio (ARG)	3275	Samantha Pereira (BRA)	3068	Lucimar de Moura (BRA)	3056
3000 metres Track Walk	Bertha Vera (ECU)	14:13.8	Luisa Nivicela (ECU)	14:24.4	Ivana Henn (BRA)	14:51.0
4 × 100 metres relay	Chile; Lisette Rondón; Hannelore Grosser; Paula Amestica; Claudia Valle	48.3	Brazil; Lila da Silva; Deborah Mosser; Adriana Andrade; Marília de Souza	48.6	Peru; Verónica Klingerberger; Gilda Massa; Gianina Cuba; Patricia Hasegawa	49.2
4 × 400 metres relay	Chile; Paula Amestica; Hannelore Grosser; Clara Morales; Lisette Rondón	3:54.8	Brazil; Lila da Silva; Shirley Ferreira; Kelly de Oliveira; Marília de Souza	3:58.1	Ecuador; Janeth Caizalitín; Mayra Cachi; Ondina Rodríguez; Corina Trelles	4:06.9

== Medal table (unofficial) ==
* Host nation (Peru)

Rank	Nation	Gold	Silver	Bronze	Total
1	Chile (CHI)	11	6	5	22
2	Brazil (BRA)	10	16	13	39
3	Argentina (ARG)	8	6	7	21
4	Ecuador (ECU)	5	3	2	10
5	Colombia (COL)	2	0	1	3
6	Peru (PER)*	1	5	8	14
7	Paraguay (PAR)	0	2	0	2
Totals (7 entries)		37	38	36	111

== Participation (unofficial) ==
Detailed result lists can be found on the "World Junior Athletics History" website. An unofficial count yields the number of about 196 athletes from about 10 countries:

- Argentina (28)
- Bolivia (3)
- Brazil (55)
- Chile (31)
- Colombia (13)
- Ecuador (13)
- Panama (3)
- Paraguay (10)
- Peru (35)
- Uruguay (5)
