= Sanderlei Parrela =

Brazilian sprinter (born 1974)

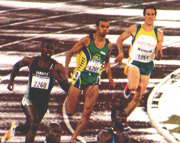
- Parrela (center) in 2000

Personal information
- Full name: Sanderlei Claro Parrela
- Nationality: Brazil
- Born: 7 October 1974 (age 51) Santos, São Paulo
- Height: 1.94 m (6 ft 4 in)
- Weight: 77 kg (170 lb)

Sport
- Sport: Athletics
- Retired: 8 June 2009 (age 34)
Medal record
Men's Athletics
Representing Brazil
World Championships
Silver medal – second place	1999 Sevilla	400 m
South American Youth Championships
Silver medal – second place	1990 Lima	400 m
Silver medal – second place	1990 Lima	4x400 m relay
- Updated on 9 May 2013

Sanderlei Claro Parrela (born 7 October 1974 in Santos) is a former Brazilian sprinter.

== Career ==
With a personal best of 44.29 seconds he is the South American record holder at 400 metres. He won a silver medal in this event at the 1999 World Championships. He finished fourth in the 400 metres race at the 2000 Sydney Olympics.

Parrela brought his career to a close at the 2009 Troféu Brasil Caixa de Atletismo in Rio de Janeiro. Finishing eighth in the 400 m with a season's best of 47.69, he ended a track career which had seen him break the South American record six times.

== International competitions ==
Year	Competition	Venue	Position	Event	Notes
Representing Brazil
1990	South American Youth Championships	Lima, Peru	2nd	400 m	50.3
1990	South American Youth Championships	Lima, Peru	2nd	4 × 400 m relay	3:24.0
1991	South American Junior Championships	Asunción, Paraguay	1st	400 m	48.6
1991	South American Junior Championships	Asunción, Paraguay	1st	4 × 400 m relay	3:21.1
1992	World Junior Championships	Seoul, South Korea	35th (h)	400 m	49.64
1992	World Junior Championships	Seoul, South Korea	13th (h)	4 × 400 m relay	3:16.35
1993	South American Junior Championships	Puerto la Cruz, Venezuela	1st	400 m	47.86
1993	South American Junior Championships	Puerto la Cruz, Venezuela	1st	4 × 400 m relay	3:17.18
1995	South American Championships	Manaus, Brazil	1st	400 m	45.74
1995	South American Championships	Manaus, Brazil	1st	4 × 400 m relay	3:04.93
1995	World Championships	Gothenburg, Sweden	35th (h)	400 m	46.59
1996	Ibero-American Championships	Medellín, Colombia	1st	400 m	45.57
1996	Ibero-American Championships	Medellín, Colombia	2nd	4 × 400 m relay	3:04.28
1996	Olympic Games	Atlanta, United States	23rd (qf)	400 m	45.72
1996	Olympic Games	Atlanta, United States	11th (sf)	4 × 400 m relay	3:03.46
1997	World Indoor Championships	Paris, France	8th (sf)	400 m	46.33
1997	South American Championships	Cali, Colombia	1st	400 m	46.17
1997	South American Championships	Cali, Colombia	1st	4 × 400 m relay	3:04.20
1997	World Championships	Athens, Greece	2nd (h)	400 m	45.35^{1}
1999	World Indoor Championships	Lisbon, Portugal	5th (sf)	400 m	46.39
1999	Pan American Games	Winnipeg, Canada	4th	400 m	44.93
1999	Pan American Games	Winnipeg, Canada	2nd	4 × 400 m relay	2:58.56
1999	World Championships	Seville, Spain	2nd	400 m	44.29
1999	World Championships	Seville, Spain	18th (h)	4 × 400 m relay	3:05.70
2000	Ibero-American Championships	Rio de Janeiro, Brazil	1st	400 m	44.80
2000	Ibero-American Championships	Rio de Janeiro, Brazil	1st	4 × 400 m relay	3:03.33
2000	Olympic Games	Sydney, Australia	4th	400 m	45.01
2001	World Indoor Championships	Lisbon, Portugal	16th (h)	400 m	47.53
2001	South American Championships	Manaus, Brazil	1st	400 m	45.11
2001	World Championships	Edmonton, Canada	4th	4 × 400 m relay	3:01.09
2001	Goodwill Games	Brisbane, Australia	6th	400 m	45.96
2004	Ibero-American Championships	Huelva, Spain	7th	400 m	46.82
2005	South American Championships	Cali, Colombia	2nd	400 m	45.83
2005	South American Championships	Cali, Colombia	1st	4 × 400 m relay	3:04.15
2006	Ibero-American Championships	Ponce, Puerto Rico	3rd	4 × 400 m relay	3:25.18
2006	South American Championships	Tunja, Colombia	1st	400 m	46.19
2006	South American Championships	Tunja, Colombia	1st	4 × 400 m relay	3:03.05
2007	Pan American Games	Rio de Janeiro, Brazil	17th (h)	400 m	46.85
2007	Pan American Games	Rio de Janeiro, Brazil	6th	4 × 400 m relay	3:05.87

^{1}Did not start in the quarterfinals
