= 1999 European Athletics U23 Championships – Men's 4 × 400 metres relay =

The men's 4 x 400 metres relay event at the 1999 European Athletics U23 Championships was held in Gothenburg, Sweden, at Ullevi on 1 August 1999.

== Medalists ==
Gold	Sebastian Debnar-Daumler; Thomas Goller; Nils Schumann; Stefan Holz; Germany
Silver	Michał Węglarski; Piotr Długosielski; Mariusz Bizoń; Piotr Haczek; Poland
Bronze	Geoff Dearman; Matthew Elias; Peter Brend; David Naismith; Great Britain

== Results ==
=== Final ===
1 August

Rank	Nation	Competitors	Time	Notes
1st place, gold medalist(s)	Germany	Sebastian Debnar-Daumler; Thomas Goller; Nils Schumann; Stefan Holz	3:02.96	CR
2nd place, silver medalist(s)	Poland	Michał Węglarski; Piotr Długosielski; Mariusz Bizoń; Piotr Haczek	3:03.22	
3rd place, bronze medalist(s)	Great Britain	Geoff Dearman; Matthew Elias; Peter Brend; David Naismith	3:03.58	
4	France	Dimitri Demonière; Loïc Lerouge; Laurent Jakiel; Marc Raquil	3:04.15	
5	Spain	Eduardo Iván Rodríguez; Luis Flores; Adrián Fernández; Pablo Vallejo	3:06.33	
6	Greece	Lambros Zervakos; Anastasios Gousis; Ioannis Lessis; Periklis Iakovakis	3:06.81	
7	Ireland	Paul Opperman; Paul McKee; Darren Hough; Brian Liddy	3:07.26	
8	Italy	Luca Mariani; Edoardo Vallet; Alessandro Giorgi; Andrea Barberi	3:09.33	

=== Heats ===
1 August
Qualified: first 3 in each heat and 2 best to the Final

==== Heat 1 ====
Rank	Nation	Competitors	Time	Notes
1	Poland	Michał Węglarski; Mariusz Bizoń; Piotr Jagielko; Maciej Ryszkowski	3:06.58	Q
2	Great Britain	Michael Parper; Richard David; Peter Brend; David Naismith	3:06.96	Q
3	Ireland	Paul Opperman; Paul McKee; Darren Hough; Brian Liddy	3:07.04	Q
4	France	Laurent Jakiel; Loïc Lerouge; Damien Grosso; Dimitri Demonière	3:08.47	q
	Czech Republic	Pavel Jelínek; Josef Rous; Filip Klvaňa; Jan Hanzl	DNF	

==== Heat 2 ====
Rank	Nation	Competitors	Time	Notes
1	Germany	Marcel Knospe; Maik Liebe; Sebastian Debnar-Daumler; Thomas Goller	3:07.56	Q
2	Italy	Luca Mariani; Edoardo Vallet; Alessandro Giorgi; Andrea Barberi	3:09.15	Q
3	Greece	Lambros Zervakos; Anastasios Gousis; Ioannis Lessis; Periklis Iakovakis	3:10.03	Q
4	Spain	Pablo Vallejo; Adrián Fernández; Luis Flores; Dávid Canal	3:10.48	q
5	Belarus	Sergey Khodanovich; Aleksandr Trutko; Leonid Vershinin; Pavel Pelepyagin	3:11.92	

== Participation ==
According to an unofficial count, 48 athletes from 10 countries participated in the event.

- Belarus (4)
- Czech Republic (4)
- France (5)
- Germany (6)
- Great Britain (6)
- Greece (4)
- Ireland (4)
- Italy (4)
- Poland (6)
- Spain (5)
