= 1998 European Athletics Championships – Men's 400 metres =

Men's 400 metres at the European Athletics Championships

The men's 400 metres at the 1998 European Athletics Championships was held at the Népstadion on 19, 20 and 21 August.

== Medalists ==
Gold	Iwan Thomas; Great Britain
Silver	Robert Maćkowiak; Poland
Bronze	Mark Richardson; Great Britain

== Results ==
KEY:	q	Fastest non-qualifiers	Q	Qualified	NR	National record	PB	Personal best	SB	Seasonal best

=== Round 1 ===
Qualification: First 3 in each heat (Q) and the next 4 fastest (q) advance to the Semifinals.

Rank	Heat	Name	Nationality	Time	Notes
1	2	David Canal	Spain	45.20	Q, PB
2	2	Iwan Thomas	Great Britain	45.44	Q
3	2	Marc Foucan	France	45.59	Q
4	2	Ashraf Saber	Italy	45.64	q, PB
5	1	Tomasz Czubak	Poland	45.96	Q
6	4	Mark Richardson	Great Britain	46.05	Q
7	1	Dmitriy Golovastov	Russia	46.16	Q, SB
7	1	Jan Poděbradský	Czech Republic	46.16	Q
9	3	Robert Maćkowiak	Poland	46.17	Q
10	4	Piotr Haczek	Poland	46.26	Q
11	4	Pierre-Marie Hilaire	France	46.27	Q
11	1	Solomon Wariso	Great Britain	46.27	q
11	4	Antonio Andres	Spain	46.27	q, PB
14	4	Konstantinos Kenteris	Greece	46.39	q
15	1	Marcel Lopuchovský	Slovakia	46.49	
15	2	Stelios Dimotsios	Greece	46.49	
17	4	Matija Šestak	Slovenia	46.57	
18	3	Marco Vaccari	Italy	46.60	Q
19	3	Innokentiy Zharov	Russia	46.73	Q
19	3	Stephan Letzelter	Germany	46.73	
21	3	Štefan Balošák	Slovakia	46.87	
22	1	Fred Mango	France	46.88	
23	1	Edoardo Vallet	Italy	47.03	
24	3	Evripides Demosthenous	Cyprus	47.15	
25	4	Péter Nyilasi	Hungary	47.16	
26	2	Boštjan Horvat	Slovenia	47.17	
27	3	Andriy Tverdostup	Ukraine	47.28	
28	1	Eugene Farrell	Ireland	47.56	
29	2	Jan Štejfa	Czech Republic	47.63	
30	3	Johan Lannefors	Sweden	47.72	
	2	Mikhail Vdovin	Russia	DNF	

=== Semifinals ===
Qualification: First 4 in each heat (Q) advance to the Final.

Rank	Heat	Name	Nationality	Time	Notes
1	2	Iwan Thomas	Great Britain	44.82	Q
2	2	Robert Maćkowiak	Poland	45.08	Q, NR
3	1	Tomasz Czubak	Poland	45.22	Q, PB
4	2	David Canal	Spain	45.29	Q
5	1	Mark Richardson	Great Britain	45.41	Q
6	2	Solomon Wariso	Great Britain	45.59	Q
7	1	Piotr Haczek	Poland	45.68	Q, PB
8	2	Konstantinos Kenteris	Greece	45.74	
9	1	Ashraf Saber	Italy	45.78	Q
10	2	Marco Vaccari	Italy	45.86	
11	2	Innokentiy Zharov	Russia	45.92	
12	1	Dmitriy Golovastov	Russia	45.93	SB
13	1	Jan Poděbradský	Czech Republic	46.01	
14	1	Pierre-Marie Hilaire	France	46.26	
15	2	Marc Foucan	France	46.52	
16	1	Antonio Andres	Spain	46.59	

=== Final ===
Rank	Name	Nationality	Time	Notes
1st place, gold medalist(s)	Iwan Thomas	Great Britain	44.52	CR
2nd place, silver medalist(s)	Robert Maćkowiak	Poland	45.04	NR
3rd place, bronze medalist(s)	Mark Richardson	Great Britain	45.14	
4	Tomasz Czubak	Poland	45.43	
5	Piotr Haczek	Poland	45.46	PB
6	Ashraf Saber	Italy	45.67	
7	David Canal	Spain	45.93	
	Solomon Wariso	Great Britain	DSQ	
