= Iliya Dzhivondov =

Bulgarian athlete

Personal information
- Born: 6 March 1978 (age 48) Plovdiv, Bulgaria

Sport
- Sport: Track and field
Medal record
Representing Bulgaria
European Indoor Championships
Gold medal – first place	2000 Ghent	400m

Iliya Dzhivondov (Cyrillic: Илия Дживондов; born 6 March 1978) is a retired Bulgarian athlete who competed in the 400 metres and 400 metres hurdles. He won the surprise 400 metres gold at the 2000 European Indoor Championships. He also competed in both events at the 2000 Summer Olympics, but failed to advance from the heats in either.

== Competition record ==
Year	Competition	Venue	Position	Event	Notes
Representing Bulgaria
1997	European Junior Championships	Ljubljana, Slovenia	20th (h)	400 m hurdles	54.59
1999	Universiade	Palma de Mallorca, Spain	6th (h)	400 m	47.99
1999	Universiade	Palma de Mallorca, Spain	19th (h)	400 m hurdles	51.15
2000	European Indoor Championships	Ghent, Belgium	1st	400 m	46.63
2000	Olympic Games	Sydney, Australia	63rd (h)	400 m	48.64
2000	Olympic Games	Sydney, Australia	61st (h)	400 m hurdles	54.36

== Personal bests ==
Outdoor

- 200 metres – 20.94 (-0.1 m/s) (Kavala 2000)
- 400 metres – 45.32 (Sofia 2000)
- 400 metres hurdles – 49.88 (Sofia 2000)

Indoor

- 200 metres – 21.22 (Piraeus 2000)
- 400 metres – 46.35 (Piraeus 2000)
