= Athletics at the 1997 Summer Universiade – Men's 400 metres =

The men's 400 metres event at the 1997 Summer Universiade was held at the Stadio Cibali in Catania, Italy on 29 and 30 August.

== Medalists ==
Gold	Silver	Bronze
Clement Chukwu; Nigeria	Jerome Davis; United States	Linval Laird; Jamaica

== Results ==
=== Heats ===
Rank	Heat	Athlete	Nationality	Time	Notes
1	2	Linval Laird	Jamaica	46.47	Q
2	7	Samir Louahla	Algeria	46.86	Q
3	2	Udeme Ekpeyong	Nigeria	47.05	Q
4	7	Sean Baldock	Great Britain	47.05	Q
5	2	Julien Hagen	Netherlands	47.18	Q
6	7	Adriaan Botha	South Africa	47.21	Q
7	1	Rampa Mosweu	Botswana	47.31	Q
8	3	Arnaud Malherbe	South Africa	47.33	Q
9	7	Ingūns Svikliņš	Latvia	47.34	Q
10	2	Dmitriy Golovastov	Russia	47.41	Q
10	3	Edoardo Vallet	Italy	47.41	Q
12	3	Andreas Rechbauer	Austria	47.43	Q
13	3	Brad Jamieson	Australia	47.44	Q
13	7	Darko Juričić	Croatia	47.44	q
15	5	Mathias Rusterholz	Switzerland	47.46	Q
16	3	Piotr Długosielski	Poland	47.57	q
17	3	Frano Bakarić	Croatia	47.61	q
18	6	Garth Robinson	Jamaica	47.63	Q
19	6	Rafik Elouardi	Austria	47.68	Q
20	5	Zsolt Szeglet	Hungary	47.71	Q
21	5	Jared Deacon	Great Britain	47.74	Q
22	5	Brian Forbes	Ireland	47.81	Q
23	2	Urmet Uusorg	Estonia	47.84	q
24	5	Kenden Maynard	United States Virgin Islands	47.85	
25	4	Boštjan Horvat	Slovenia	48.07	Q
26	4	Clement Chukwu	Nigeria	48.18	Q
27	6	Jerome Davis	United States	48.21	Q
28	4	Jens Dautzenberg	Germany	48.25	Q
29	6	Alexander Müller	Germany	48.28	Q
30	1	Nick Cowan	New Zealand	48.32	Q
31	1	Declan Stack	Australia	48.38	Q
32	4	Kjell Provost	Belgium	48.40	Q
33	6	Henry Semiti	Fiji	48.50	
34	2	Ercan Sunu	Turkey	48.53	
35	4	Moses Asonya	Uganda	48.77	
36	6	Yang Teng-kai	Chinese Taipei	49.00	
37	5	Emmanuel Rubayiza	Rwanda	49.10	
38	7	Erwin Naimhwaka	Namibia	49.24	
39	5	Javier Verme	Peru	49.35	
40	1	Danny McCray	United States	49.45	Q
41	4	Niclas Rudin	Sweden	49.47	
42	6	Immanuel Kharigub	Namibia	49.54	
43	3	Niclas Nygren-Johansson	Sweden	49.65	
44	7	Noah Ssengendo	Uganda	50.20	
45	1	Philip Rotich	Kenya	50.58	
46	2	Luis Romero	Peru	50.71	
47	2	Ahmed Faquieh	Jordan	50.89	
48	6	Nidal Shelbaya	Jordan	51.11	
49	1	Carlos Sequeira	Nicaragua	51.76	
50	4	Saakarea Babalone	Botswana	53.41	
51	7	Fabio Canini	San Marino	55.19	
	5	Roman Galkin	Ukraine	DNF	

=== Quarterfinals ===
Rank	Heat	Athlete	Nationality	Time	Notes
1	4	Linval Laird	Jamaica	45.77	Q
2	2	Clement Chukwu	Nigeria	46.06	Q
3	2	Arnaud Malherbe	South Africa	46.11	Q
4	2	Danny McCray	United States	46.23	Q
5	2	Mathias Rusterholz	Switzerland	46.25	Q
6	2	Declan Stack	Australia	46.31	
7	2	Jens Dautzenberg	Germany	46.33	
8	1	Garth Robinson	Jamaica	46.36	Q
9	3	Dmitriy Golovastov	Russia	46.50	Q
10	1	Jerome Davis	United States	46.53	Q
11	4	Sean Baldock	Great Britain	46.55	Q
12	4	Andreas Rechbauer	Austria	46.57	Q
13	3	Samir Louahla	Algeria	46.58	Q
14	4	Udeme Ekpeyong	Nigeria	46.64	Q
15	1	Rafik Elouardi	Austria	46.81	Q
15	3	Jared Deacon	Great Britain	46.81	Q
17	3	Boštjan Horvat	Slovenia	46.96	Q
18	4	Adriaan Botha	South Africa	47.01	
19	1	Ingūns Svikliņš	Latvia	47.04	Q
20	1	Kjell Provost	Belgium	47.04	
21	2	Darko Juričić	Croatia	47.05	
22	3	Edoardo Vallet	Italy	47.06	
23	1	Nick Cowan	New Zealand	47.10	
24	3	Julien Hagen	Netherlands	47.12	
25	2	Zsolt Szeglet	Hungary	47.32	
26	1	Rampa Mosweu	Botswana	47.46	
27	4	Brad Jamieson	Australia	47.52	
28	3	Frano Bakarić	Croatia	47.53	
29	1	Piotr Długosielski	Poland	47.56	
30	4	Urmet Uusorg	Estonia	47.57	
31	4	Brian Forbes	Ireland	47.64	
32	3	Alexander Müller	Germany	48.47	

=== Semifinals ===
Rank	Heat	Athlete	Nationality	Time	Notes
1	2	Linval Laird	Jamaica	46.12	Q
2	2	Danny McCray	United States	46.58	Q
3	2	Arnaud Malherbe	South Africa	46.75	Q
4	1	Garth Robinson	Jamaica	47.01	Q
5	2	Udeme Ekpeyong	Nigeria	47.02	Q
6	2	Samir Louahla	Algeria	47.10	
7	1	Jerome Davis	United States	47.24	Q
8	1	Clement Chukwu	Nigeria	47.49	Q
9	2	Dmitriy Golovastov	Russia	47.54	
10	2	Jared Deacon	Great Britain	47.73	
11	1	Andreas Rechbauer	Austria	48.10	Q
12	1	Ingūns Svikliņš	Latvia	48.38	
13	2	Rafik Elouardi	Austria	48.50	
14	1	Sean Baldock	Great Britain	48.93	
15	1	Boštjan Horvat	Slovenia	49.22	
	1	Mathias Rusterholz	Switzerland	DNS	

=== Final ===
Rank	Athlete	Nationality	Time	Notes
1st place, gold medalist(s)	Clement Chukwu	Nigeria	44.81	
2nd place, silver medalist(s)	Jerome Davis	United States	45.30	
3rd place, bronze medalist(s)	Linval Laird	Jamaica	45.54	
4	Garth Robinson	Jamaica	45.85	
5	Arnaud Malherbe	South Africa	46.23	
6	Udeme Ekpeyong	Nigeria	47.39	
7	Andreas Rechbauer	Austria	48.34	
	Danny McCray	United States	DNF	
