= Anastasios Gousis =

Greek sprinter (born 1979)

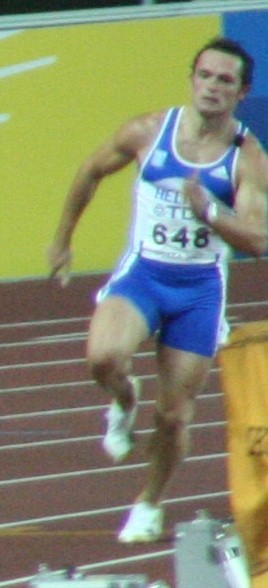
- Gousis finishing 8th in Osaka, 2007.

Personal information
- Born: 7 July 1979 (age 47)

Sport
- Country: Greece
- Sport: Athletics
- Events: 200 metres, 400 metres

Achievements and titles
- Personal bests: 20.11 sec, 21.08 sec (i), 45.55 sec, 46.73 sec (i)

Anastasios "Tasos" Gousis (Greek: Αναστάσιος "Τάσος" Γκούσης, born 7 July 1979) is a Greek sprint athlete.

He was born in Corfu.

He competed in the 2000

m and 400 m in the 2000 Olympics, but did not progress further from the heats in either event. At the 2004 Olympics he made the semi-finals in the 200 m and competed for Greece in the 4 × 400 m relay.[1]

He finished eighth in the 200 m final at the 2006 European Athletics Championships and at the 2007 World Championships.

He was tested positive for methyltrienolone in his A-sample on 4 August 2008, before the 2008 Summer Olympics, and was called back to Greece, pending the results of his B-sample. He received an IAAF suspension from August 2008 to August 2010.

== Honours ==
Year	Competition	Venue	Position	Event	Notes
Representing Greece
1999	European U23 Championships	Gothenburg, Sweden	10th (sf)	400m	46.61
1999	European U23 Championships	Gothenburg, Sweden	8th	4 × 100 m relay	39.98
1999	European U23 Championships	Gothenburg, Sweden	6th	4 × 400 m relay	3:06.81
2000	Olympic Games	Sydney, Australia	18th (h)	4 × 400 m relay	3:06.50
2002	European Championships	Munich, Germany	6th	4 × 400 m relay	3:04.26
2003	World Championships	Paris, France	6th	4 × 400 m relay	3:02.56
2004	Olympic Games	Athens, Greece	11th (sf)	200 m	20.68
2004	Olympic Games	Athens, Greece	12th (sf)	4 × 400 m relay	3:04.27 SB
2006	European Championships	Gothenburg, Sweden	8th	200 m	20.94
2007	World Championships	Osaka, Japan	8th	200 m	20.75
