= Lars Figura =

German sprinter (born 1976)

Personal information
- Born: 25 March 1976 (age 50) Bremen, West Germany

Sport
- Sport: Track and field
Medal record
Representing Germany
European U23 Championships
| Bronze medal – third place | 1997 Turku | 4x400m relay |
European Indoor Championships
| Silver medal – second place | 2000 Ghent | 4x400m relay |

Lars Figura (born 25 March 1976) is a former German sprinter who specialised in the 400 metres.

His personal best time is 45.93 seconds, achieved in June 2001 in Stuttgart.

Figura became German champion in the 400 metres twice, in 2000 and 2001. He won more medals at the German indoor championships, starting with a bronze in 1997, silver medals in 1998, 2000 and 2002, and gold medals in 1999 and 2001. He represented the clubs SV Werder Bremen and, from 2001, LG Olympia Dortmund.

== Achievements ==
| Year | Competition | Venue | Position | Event | Notes |
Representing Germany
| 1997 | European Athletics U23 Championships | Turku, Finland | 3rd | 4 × 400 m relay | 3:04.32 |
| 1999 | World Indoor Championships | Maebashi, Japan | 6th | 400 m | 47.06 |
| 1999 | Universiade | Palma, Spain | 4th | 4 × 400 m relay | 3:06.03 |
| 2000 | European Indoor Championships | Ghent, Belgium | 4th | 400 m | 47.53 |
| 2000 | European Indoor Championships | Ghent, Belgium | 2nd | 4 × 400 m relay | 3:06.64 |
| 2001 | European Cup | Bremen, Germany | 3rd | 4 × 400 m relay | 3:02.71 |
| 2001 | World Championships | Edmonton, Canada | 7th | 4 × 400 m relay | 3:03.52 |
| 2002 | European Championships | Munich, Germany | 7th | 4 × 400 m relay | 3:08.56 |
