= Matija Šestak =

Slovenian sprinter

Matija Šestak (born 30 December 1972 in Ljubljana) is a retired Slovenian sprinter who specialised in the 400 metres. He represented his country at the 2000 and 2004 Summer Olympics reaching the semifinals at the second occasion. He also reached the semifinals at the 1999 World Championships.

He is married to a Serbian triple jumper, Marija Šestak, who switched her nationality to Slovenian after marriage.

== Competition record ==
Year	Competition	Venue	Position	Event	Notes
Representing Yugoslavia
1989	European Junior Championships	Varaždin, Yugoslavia	7th	4 × 400 m relay	3:13.79
1990	World Junior Championships	Plovdiv, Bulgaria	30th (h)	400 m	49.05
1990	World Junior Championships	Plovdiv, Bulgaria	11th (h)	4 × 400 m relay	3:09.67
1991	European Junior Championships	Thessaloniki, Greece	11th (sf)	800 m	1:50.45
Representing Slovenia
1996	European Indoor Championships	Stockholm, Sweden	10th (h)	400 m	47.88
1997	Mediterranean Games	Bari, Italy	4th (h)	400 m	47.33
1998	European Championships	Budapest, Hungary	17th (h)	400 m	46.57
1998	European Championships	Budapest, Hungary	10th (h)	4 × 400 m relay	3:07.78
1999	World Indoor Championships	Maebashi, Japan	8th (sf)	400 m	46.84
1999	World Championships	Seville, Spain	9th (sf)	400 m	45.47
1999	World Championships	Seville, Spain	12th (h)	4 × 400 m relay	3:02.70
2000	Olympic Games	Sydney, Australia	33rd (h)	400 m	45.95
2000	Olympic Games	Sydney, Australia	29th (h)	4 × 400 m relay	3:10.07
2002	European Championships	Munich, Germany	25th (h)	400 m	46.97
2004	Olympic Games	Athens, Greece	23rd (sf)	400 m	46.54

== Personal best ==
Outdoor

- 200 metres – 20.79 (+2.0 m/s) (Nova Gorica 2004)
- 300 metres – 32.34 (Ljubljana 2004) NR
- 400 metres – 45.43 (Seville 1999) NR

Indoor

- 200 metres – 21.32 (Turin 1999)
- 400 metres – 46.71 (Stuttgart 2000) NR
