= Iván Rodríguez (hurdler) =

Spanish hurdler (born 1978)

Eduardo Iván Rodríguez
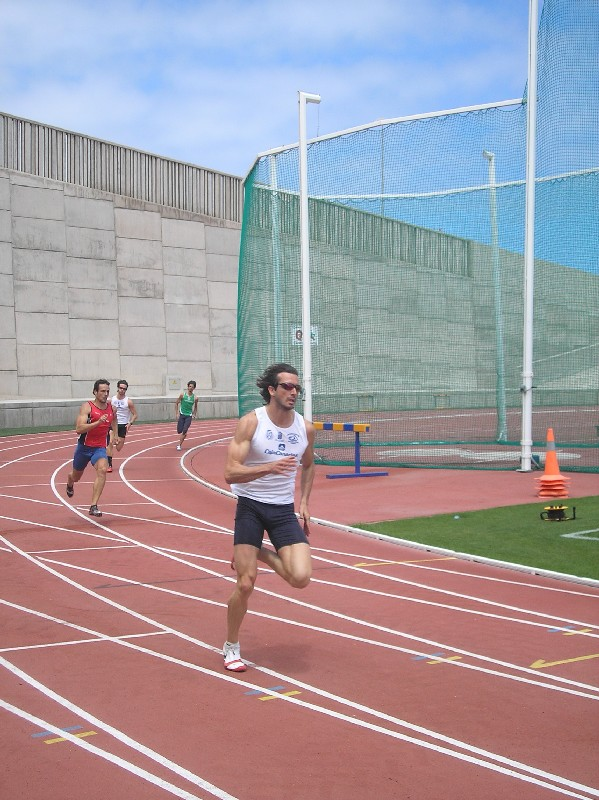
- Eduardo Iván Rodríguez in 2006

Personal information
- Born: 7 April 1978 (age 48) Santa Cruz de Tenerife, Spain
- Height: 1.83 m (6 ft 0 in)
- Weight: 74 kg (163 lb)

Sport
- Sport: Track and field
- Event: 400 metres hurdles
- Club: Tenerife Cajacanarias

Eduardo Iván Rodríguez Ramallo (born 7 April 1978) is a Spanish former athlete specializing in the 400 metres hurdles. He competed at the 2004 Olympic Games reaching the semifinals.

His personal best in the event is 49.08 from 2004.

== Competition record ==
Year	Competition	Venue	Position	Event	Notes
Representing Spain
1999	European U23 Championships	Gothenburg, Sweden	6th	400 m hurdles	50.67
1999	European U23 Championships	Gothenburg, Sweden	5th	4 × 400 m relay	3:06.33
2000	European Indoor Championships	Ghent, Belgium	20th (h)	400 m	48.08
2000	Olympic Games	Sydney, Australia	20th (h)	4 × 400 m relay	3:06.87
2001	World Championships	Edmonton, Canada	20th (sf)	400 m hurdles	49.92
2001	World Championships	Edmonton, Canada	6th	4 × 400 m relay	3:02.24
2001	Universiade	Beijing, China	18th (h)	400 m hurdles	50.85
2002	European Championships	Munich, Germany	18th (h)	400 m hurdles	50.26
2003	World Championships	Paris, France	21st (sf)	400 m hurdles	50.06
2003	World Championships	Paris, France	5th	4 × 400 m relay	3:02.50
2004	Ibero-American Championships	Huelva, Spain	1st	400 m hurdles	49.08
2004	Ibero-American Championships	Huelva, Spain	1st	4 × 400 m relay	3:05.68
2004	Olympic Games	Athens, Greece	22nd (sf)	400 m hurdles	49.77
2004	Olympic Games	Athens, Greece	14th (h)	4 × 400 m relay	3:05.03
2005	World Championships	Helsinki, Finland	21st (sf)	400 m hurdles	49.97
2005	Universiade	İzmir, Turkey	9th (sf)	400 m hurdles	50.50
2006	European Championships	Gothenburg, Sweden	19th (h)	400 m hurdles	51.24
