= Troy McIntosh =

Bahamian sprinter

Personal information
- Nationality: Bahamas
- Born: March 29, 1973 (age 53)
- Height: 1.78 m (5 ft 10 in)
- Weight: 75 kg (165 lb)

Sport
- Sport: Running
- Event: Sprints
- College team: Morgan State Bears
- Coached by: Trevor Graham

Achievements and titles
- Personal bests: 200 m: 20.62 (Baton Rouge 2003); 400 m: 44.73 (Mexico City 1996)
Medal record
Men's athletics
Representing the Bahamas
Olympic Games
Bronze medal – third place	2000 Sydney	4 × 400 m relay
World Championships
Gold medal – first place	2001 Edmonton	4 × 400 m relay
Silver medal – second place	2005 Helsinki	4 × 400 m relay
Commonwealth Games
Bronze medal – third place	2002 Manchester	4 × 400 m relay
CAC Junior Championships
Bronze medal – third place	1990 Havana	4 × 100 m relay

Troy McIntosh (born March 29, 1973) is a male sprinter from The Bahamas. He represented his nation at the Summer Olympics in 1996 and 2000. He had his greatest achievements with the Bahamian 4 × 400 metres relay team. He won the bronze medal in that event at the 2000 Summer Olympics after the United States team were retrospectively disqualified due to doping. This same disqualification, of Antonio Pettigrew, also resulted in Bahamas taking the gold medal at the 2001 World Championships in Athletics, where McIntosh was initially a silver medallist.

Individually he was the bronze medallist in the 400 metres at the 1998 IAAF World Cup and the champion at the 1998 Central American and Caribbean Games. He ran an indoor Bahamian record of 46.05 seconds at the 1999 IAAF World Indoor Championships, where he finished fourth.

== Achievements ==
Year	Competition	Venue	Position	Event	Notes
Representing Bahamas
1990	CAC Junior Championships (U-20)	Havana, Cuba	3rd	4 × 100 m relay	41.74
1990	CAC Junior Championships (U-20)	Havana, Cuba	4th	4 × 400 m relay	3:13.62
1995	World Championships	Gothenburg, Sweden	18th (qf)	400 m	45.72
1995	World Championships	Gothenburg, Sweden	12th (h)	4 × 400 m relay	3:02.85 NR
1996	Olympic Games	Atlanta, United States	37th (h)	400 m	46.42
1996	Olympic Games	Atlanta, United States	7th	4 × 400 m relay	3:02.71
1997	World Indoor Championships	Paris, France	6th (sf)	400 m	46.20
1998	Central American and Caribbean Games	Maracaibo, Venezuela	1st	400 m	44.84
1998	World Cup	Johannesburg, South Africa	3rd	400 m	45.45
1998	World Cup	Johannesburg, South Africa	2nd	4 × 400 m relay	2:59.77
1998	Commonwealth Games	Kuala Lumpur, Malaysia	8th (sf)	400 m	45.19
1999	World Indoor Championships	Maebashi, Japan	4th	400 m	46.05 NR
1999	Pan American Games	Winnipeg, Canada	6th	400 m	45.60
1999	World Championships	Seville, Spain	6th	4 × 400 m relay	3:02.74
2000	Olympic Games	Sydney, Australia	59th (h)	400 m	47.06
2000	Olympic Games	Sydney, Australia	3rd	4 × 400 m relay	2:59.23
2001	World Championships	Edmonton, Canada	1st	4 × 400 m relay	
2002	Commonwealth Games	Manchester, United Kingdom	3rd	4 × 400 m relay	3:01.35
2003	Pan American Games	Santo Domingo, Dominican Republic	22nd (h)	200 m	21.56
2005	World Championships	Helsinki, Finland	2nd	4 × 400 m relay	2:59.73 WL (h)
2006	Commonwealth Games	Melbourne, Australia	–	200 m	DNF
2007	Pan American Games	Rio de Janeiro, Brazil	7th	4 × 100 m relay	39.91
