= Kjell Provost =

Belgian sprinter (born 1977)

Personal information
- Born: 21 June 1977 (age 49)

Sport
- Sport: Track and field
Medal record
Representing Belgium
European U23 Championships
Bronze medal – third place	1997 Turku	400m

Kjell Provost (born 21 June 1977) is a Belgian sprinter who specialized in the 400 metres.

Competing in the 400 metres hurdles, he finished fourth at the 1995 European Junior Championships and fourth again at the 1996 World Junior Championships. He trained hurdles under Bart Cleppe. Provost received the Golden Spike talent award of 1996.

Switching to the 400 metres, he ran in 46.73 seconds during the winter of 1997 to qualify for the 1997 World Indoor Championships, where he reached the semi-final. Outdoors, he improved to 46.04 when he won the 1997 European Cup First League Group B meet. He won the bronze medal at the 1997 European U23 Championships in a new personal best of 45.99, and also competed at the 1997 Summer Universiade.

The following season he competed at the 1998 European Indoor Championships and certain IAAF Golden League meets. He won the 1999 European Cup First League Group A meet, and lowered his personal best to 45.88 at the Hechtel Night of Athletics meet, but was knocked out in the semi-final of the 1999 European U23 Championships. He was also eliminated from the heats at the 2000 European Indoor Championships. His last competition sub-46 was the 2000 Memorial Van Damme, where he finished fifth.

Provost became Belgian champion in 1998, 1999 and 2000 as well as Belgian indoor champion in 1998, 2000 and 2001.

While he was active, he entered a relationship with multiple Belgian national champion in the 400 and 800 metres, Sandra Stals. De Standaard called them "the fastest couple in Flanders". Their daughter also took up athletics.
