= 1999 IAAF World Indoor Championships – Men's 400 metres =

The men's 400 metres event at the 1999 IAAF World Indoor Championships was held on March 5–7.

== Medalists ==
| Gold | Silver | Bronze |
|---|---|---|
| Jamie Baulch; Great Britain | Milton Campbell; United States | Alejandro Cárdenas; Mexico |

== Results ==
=== Heats ===
First 2 of each heat (Q) and next 8 fastest (q) qualified for the semifinals.

| Rank | Heat | Name | Nationality | Time | Notes |
|---|---|---|---|---|---|
| 1 | 3 | Alejandro Cárdenas | Mexico | 46.45 | Q, SB |
| 2 | 4 | Jamie Baulch | Great Britain | 46.46 | Q |
| 3 | 4 | David Canal | Spain | 46.48 | Q |
| 4 | 2 | Troy McIntosh | Bahamas | 46.49 | Q, SB |
| 4 | 3 | Lars Figura | Germany | 46.49 | Q, PB |
| 6 | 4 | Fred Mango | France | 46.64 | q, PB |
| 7 | 2 | Deon Minor | United States | 46.69 | Q |
| 8 | 5 | Milton Campbell | United States | 46.77 | Q |
| 9 | 5 | Sanderlei Parrela | Brazil | 46.81 | Q |
| 10 | 2 | Sunday Bada | Nigeria | 46.87 | q |
| 11 | 3 | Piotr Długosielski | Poland | 46.90 | q, PB |
| 12 | 2 | Jun Osakada | Japan | 47.00 | q |
| 12 | 5 | Matija Šestak | Slovenia | 47.00 | q |
| 14 | 4 | Tomasz Czubak | Poland | 47.04 | q |
| 15 | 2 | Periklis Iakovakis | Greece | 47.13 | q |
| 16 | 3 | Casey Vincent | Australia | 47.15 | q |
| 17 | 5 | Konstantinos Kenteris | Greece | 47.35 | |
| 18 | 5 | Darko Juričić | Croatia | 47.36 | |
| 19 | 1 | Roxbert Martin | Jamaica | 47.37 | Q |
| 20 | 1 | Juan Vicente Trull | Spain | 47.51 | Q |
| 21 | 5 | Carlos Santa | Dominican Republic | 47.56 | |
| 22 | 1 | Laurent Clerc | Switzerland | 47.58 | |
| 22 | 3 | Du'aine Ladejo | Great Britain | 47.58 | |
| 24 | 1 | Masayoshi Kan | Japan | 47.72 | |
| 25 | 1 | Siniša Peša | Yugoslavia | 47.86 | |
| 26 | 3 | Moses Kondowe | Malawi | 50.39 | |
| 26 | 4 | Salem Al Ameeri | Bahrain | 50.39 | PB |
| 28 | 1 | Alejandro José Navarro | El Salvador | 51.12 | |
| 29 | 4 | Marcel Yambo Bakulu | Democratic Republic of the Congo | 51.18 | NR |

=== Semifinals ===
First 2 of each semifinal qualified directly (Q) for the final.

| Rank | Heat | Name | Nationality | Time | Notes |
|---|---|---|---|---|---|
| 1 | 3 | Jamie Baulch | Great Britain | 46.14 | Q |
| 2 | 2 | Milton Campbell | United States | 46.23 | Q |
| 3 | 2 | Troy McIntosh | Bahamas | 46.32 | Q, SB |
| 4 | 3 | Roxbert Martin | Jamaica | 46.34 | Q |
| 5 | 2 | Sanderlei Parrela | Brazil | 46.39 | |
| 6 | 1 | Alejandro Cárdenas | Mexico | 46.51 | Q |
| 7 | 1 | Lars Figura | Germany | 46.71 | Q |
| 8 | 3 | Matija Šestak | Slovenia | 46.84 | NR |
| 9 | 2 | Juan Vicente Trull | Spain | 46.88 | PB |
| 10 | 1 | David Canal | Spain | 46.93 | |
| 11 | 2 | Jun Osakada | Japan | 46.95 | |
| 12 | 3 | Fred Mango | France | 47.06 | |
| 13 | 1 | Sunday Bada | Nigeria | 47.07 | |
| 14 | 3 | Deon Minor | United States | 47.12 | |
| 15 | 3 | Periklis Iakovakis | Greece | 47.23 | |
| 16 | 1 | Piotr Długosielski | Poland | 47.55 | |
| 17 | 1 | Casey Vincent | Australia | 48.03 | |
| | 2 | Tomasz Czubak | Poland | DNF | |

=== Final ===
| Rank | Name | Nationality | Time | Notes |
|---|---|---|---|---|
| 1st place, gold medalist(s) | Jamie Baulch | Great Britain | 45.73 | |
| 2nd place, silver medalist(s) | Milton Campbell | United States | 45.99 | |
| 3rd place, bronze medalist(s) | Alejandro Cárdenas | Mexico | 46.02 | NR |
| 4 | Troy McIntosh | Bahamas | 46.05 | NR |
| 5 | Roxbert Martin | Jamaica | 46.85 | |
| 6 | Lars Figura | Germany | 47.06 | |
