= Mark Hylton (sprinter) =

British sprinter (born 1976)

Personal information
- Nationality: British (English)
- Born: 24 September 1976 (age 50) Slough, England
- Height: 176 cm (5 ft 9 in)
- Weight: 69 kg (152 lb)

Sport
- Sport: Athletics
- Event: Sprints/400m
- Club: Windsor, Slough & Eton AC
Medal record
Men's athletics
Representing Great Britain
Olympic Games
Silver medal – second place	1996 Atlanta	4 × 400 m relay
World Indoor Championships
Silver medal – second place	2003 Birmingham	4 × 400 m relay
European Championships
Gold medal – first place	1998 Budapest	4 × 400 m relay
World Cup
Gold medal – first place	1998 Johannesburg	4 × 400 m relay
Representing England
Commonwealth Games
Silver medal – second place	1998 Kuala Lumpur	4 × 400 m relay
Gold medal – first place	2002 Manchester	4 × 400 m relay

Mark David Hylton (born 24 September 1976) is a former British 400 metres sprinter. Hylton won a silver medal in the relay at the 1996 Summer Olympics in Atlanta.

== Biography ==
Throughout his career, Hylton represented Windsor, Slough, Eton and Hounslow Athletic Club.

In 1991, he won the English Schools' Junior 200 metres title by 1/100 of a second from Jamie Sykes of South Yorkshire. He also competed in and won the Schools International Athletic Board (SIAB) indoor 200 metres, for England.

In 1993, he won the English Schools' Intermediate 400 metres title. He also went on to win the SIAB 400 metres title. Also this year he won the AAA U17 400 metres title, both indoors and outdoors.

In 1994, he won the English Schools' Senior 400 metres title. He also won a bronze medal as part of a British 4 × 400 metres relay team at the World Junior Championships. Also this year he won the AAA U20 400 metres title.

In 1995, he won the AAA U20 Indoor Championships 200 metres and AAA Indoor Championships 400 metres, breaking the British indoor record in the latter with a time of 46.56 seconds. Outdoors, he won the AAA U20 Championships 200 metres and he came second at the AAA Championships over 400 metres. He then went on to win the European Junior Championships over the same distance. At the same European Championships he also won the 4 × 400 metres relay title. Later in the season he raced as part of the British team that finished fourth in the 4 × 400 metres relay at the World Championships. Also this year he retained his English Schools' Senior 400 metres title.

In 1996, he raced as part of the British team that won a silver medal in the 4 × 400 metres relay at the Olympic Games. He only raced in the heats, but still received a medal. He also won the Scottish Championships 400 metres that year, as an international competitor. This year he also retained his AAA indoor 400 metres title.

In 1997, he competed at the World Championships in the 4 × 400 metres relay as part of the British team that originally finished second but were upgraded to gold as a result of the disqualification of the US team. He only raced in the heats, but still received a medal. He also won the inaugural European U23 Championships 400 metres title. This year he won his third and final AAA indoor 400 metres title.

In 1998, he competed at the European Championships as part of the British team in the 4 × 400 metres relay, winning a gold medal. Later in the year he represented England in the Commonwealth Games in the 4 × 400 metres relay, winning silver. He won a silver medal over 400 metres at the AAA Indoor Championships.

In 1999, he raced as part of the British team in the 4 × 400 metres relay at the World Championships, failing to qualify for the final. He came third outdoors over 400 m at the AAA Championships. He won a bronze medal over 400 metres at the AAA Indoor Championships.

He tested positive for nandrolone in 1999, but a two-year ban was overturned following an appeal which revealed errors in the testing of his sample. One aspect of the test showed a level of nandrolone at three nanograms per millilitre (one nanogram above the maximum limit), but flaws in other aspects saw the ban dismissed due to reasonable doubt.

In 2001, he competed in the 4 × 400 metres relay at the World Indoor Championships for Great Britain, finishing fourth in the final. That year he also competed in the 4 × 400 metres relay at the World Championships, racing only in the heats. He also won the Scottish Championships 200 metres that year, as an international competitor. He came third outdoors over 400 metres at the AAA Championships. He won the South of England 400 metres title.

In 2002, he raced for England in the heats of the 4 × 400 metres relay as part of the team that won gold at the Commonwealth Games.

In 2003, he competed in the 4 × 400 metres relay as part of the British team that won silver at the World Indoor Championships for Great Britain. He only raced in the heats, but still received a medal.

== Achievements ==
Year	Competition	Venue	Position	Event	Notes
Representing the United Kingdom
1994	World Junior Championships	Lisbon, Portugal	4th	400 m	46.37
1994	World Junior Championships	Lisbon, Portugal	3rd	4 × 400 m relay	3:06.59
1996	Olympic Games	Atlanta, United States	2nd	4 × 400 m relay	3:01.79
1997	European U23 Championships	Turku, Finland	1st	400 m	45.71
1997	European U23 Championships	Turku, Finland	5th	4 × 400 m relay	3:05.77
