= Jacek Bocian =

Polish sprinter (born 1976)

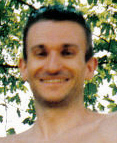
- Bocian in 2007

Personal information
- Nationality: Polish
- Born: 15 September 1976 (age 49) Kalisz, Poland

Sport
- Sport: sprinting
Medal record
Men's athletics
Representing Poland
World Championships
Gold medal – first place	1999 Seville	4 × 400 m relay
Bronze medal – third place	2001 Edmonton	4 × 400 m relay
World Indoor Championships
Gold medal – first place	2001 Lisbon	4 × 400 m relay
Silver medal – second place	1999 Maebashi	4 × 400 m relay
European Championships
Silver medal – second place	1998 Budapest	4 × 400 m relay

Jacek Bocian (born 15 September 1976 in Kalisz) is a Polish former sprinter who specialised in the 400 metres. His biggest successes came in the Polish 4 × 400 metres relay, including gold medals at the 1999 World Championships and 2001 World Indoor Championships, as well as the silver at the 1999 World Indoor Championships. In addition, he competed at the 2000 Summer Olympics.

He has 400 metres personal best of 45.99 seconds outdoors (Kraków 2000) and 46.68 seconds indoors (Spała 1999).

== Competition record ==
Year	Competition	Venue	Position	Event	Notes
Representing Poland
1995	European Junior Championships	Nyíregyháza, Hungary	2nd	400 m	46.59
1995	European Junior Championships	Nyíregyháza, Hungary	3rd	4 × 400 m relay	3:09.65
1997	European U23 Championships	Turku, Finland	1st	4 × 400 m relay	3:03.07
1998	European Championships	Budapest, Hungary	2nd (h)	4 × 400 m relay	3:03.59
1999	World Indoor Championships	Maebashi, Japan	2nd	4 × 400 m relay	3:03.01 (AR)
1999	World Championships	Seville, Spain	1st	4 × 400 m relay	2:58.91
2000	Olympic Games	Sydney, Australia	2nd (h)	4 × 400 m relay	3:01.30
2001	World Indoor Championships	Lisbon, Portugal	1st	4 × 400 m relay	3:04.47
2001	World Championships	Edmonton, Canada	3rd	4 × 400 m relay	2:59.71
2001	Goodwill Games	Brisbane, Australia	3rd	4 × 400 m relay	3:04.79
