= Márcio da Cruz =

Brazilian long jumper

Personal information
- Full name: Márcio Rogerio da Cruz
- Born: 6 February 1974 (age 52) São Paulo, Brazil
- Height: 1.85 m (6 ft 1 in)
- Weight: 75 kg (165 lb)

Sport
- Sport: Athletics
- Event: Long jump
- Club: Reebok/Funilense Cosmópolis

Márcio Rogerio da Cruz (born 6 February 1974) is a Brazilian athlete. He competed in the men's long jump at the 1996 Summer Olympics.
