= Piotr Długosielski =

Polish sprinter (born 1977)

Personal information
- Nationality: Polish
- Born: 4 April 1977 (age 49) Warsaw, Poland

Sport
- Sport: Sprint running
Medal record
Representing Poland
World Championships
Gold medal – first place	1999 Seville	4 x 400 m relay
Bronze medal – third place	2001 Edmonton	4 × 400 m relay

Piotr Długosielski (born 4 April 1977) is a retired Polish athlete specializing in the 400 metres. He was part of the Polish 4 × 400 metres relay during its best years, winning several medals, although he was often selected to run in heats only. He participated at the 2000 Summer Olympics in Sydney.

He is currently the secretary of the Polish Athletics Federation.

== Competition record ==
Year	Competition	Venue	Position	Event	Notes
Representing Poland
1996	World Junior Championships	Sydney, Australia	8th	400 m	47.43
1996	World Junior Championships	Sydney, Australia	6th	4 × 400 m relay	3:08.04
1997	European U23 Championships	Turku, Finland	8th	400 m	46.91
1997	European U23 Championships	Turku, Finland	1st	4 × 400 m relay	3:03.07
1997	Universiade	Catania, Italy	29th (h)	400 m	47.56
1997	Universiade	Catania, Italy	9th (h)	4 × 400 m relay	3:09.17
1998	European Championships	Budapest, Hungary	2nd (h)	4 × 400 m relay	3:03.59
1999	World Indoor Championships	Maebashi, Japan	16th (sf)	400 m	47.55
1999	European U23 Championships	Gothenburg, Sweden	12th (sf)	400 m	46.78
1999	European U23 Championships	Gothenburg, Sweden	2nd	4 × 400 m relay	3:03.22
1999	World Championships	Seville, Spain	3rd (h)	4 × 400 m relay	3:00.86
2000	Olympic Games	Sydney, Australia	6th	4 × 400 m relay	3:03.22
2001	World Championships	Edmonton, Canada	20th (sf)	400 m	46.62
2001	World Championships	Edmonton, Canada	3rd	4 × 400 m relay	2:59.71
2004	World Indoor Championships	Budapest, Hungary	10th (h)	4 × 400 m relay	3:10.33

== Personal best ==
Outdoor

- 200 metres – 21.19 (1998)
- 400 metres – 45.67 (Bydgoszcz 2001)

Indoor

- 400 metres – 47.42 (Spała 1999)
