= Marc Raquil =

French sprinter

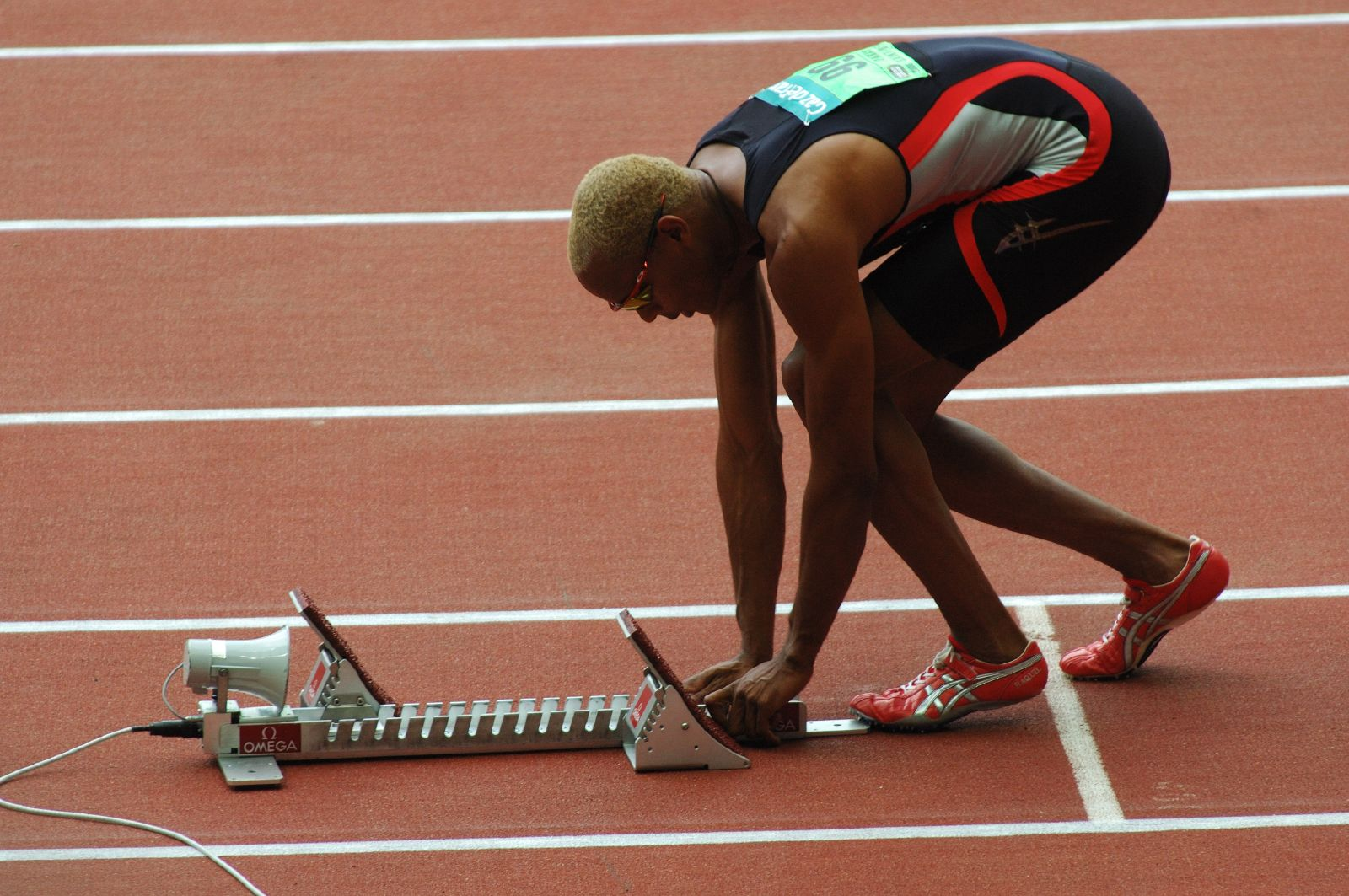
Marc Raquil preparing for a start in 2006

Marc Raquil (born 2 April 1977) is a French runner of Martiniquais origin who competes in the 400 metres and 4 × 400 m relay. He won the 4 × 400 m relay gold medal and the 400 m silver medal at the 2003 World Championships. In 2004, his 4 × 400 m relay team was retroactively awarded gold medals after the United States 4 × 400 m relay team was stripped of its gold medals due to the failed drug tests of two members of the relay (Calvin Harrison and Jerome Young). Since Young had also finished first in the 400 m at the 2003 World Championships, the failed drug test also resulted in Raquil being retroactively awarded a silver medal in the 400 m. Raquil has also won three gold medals and one bronze medal at the European Indoor and Outdoor Championships.

== Achievements ==
Year	Competition	Venue	Position	Event	Notes
Representing France
1997	European U23 Championships	Turku, Finland	4th	4 × 400 m relay	3:04.80
1999	European U23 Championships	Gothenburg, Sweden	3rd	400 m	46.18
1999	European U23 Championships	Gothenburg, Sweden	4th	4 × 400 m relay	3:04.15
2000	European Indoor Championships	Ghent, Belgium	3rd	400 metres	47.28
2000	Olympic Games	Sydney, Australia	4th	4 × 400 m relay	3:00.64
2003	World Championships	Paris, France	2nd	400 metres	44.79
2003	World Championships	Paris, France	1st	4 × 400 m relay	2:58.96
2003	World Athletics Final	Monte Carlo, Monaco	5th	400 metres	45.96
2005	European Indoor Championships	Madrid, Spain	1st	4 × 400 m relay	3:07.90
2005	World Championships	Helsinki, Finland	6th	4 × 400 m relay	3:03.10
2006	European Championships	Gothenburg, Sweden	1st	400 metres	45.02
2006	European Championships	Gothenburg, Sweden	1st	4 × 400 m relay	3:01.10

=== Outdoor personal bests ===
- 200 metres - 21.03 (2001)
- 400 metres - 44.79 (2003)
- 800 metres - 1:50.90 (2003)

== Later career ==
Raquil was prevented by injuries from competing in the 2004 and 2008 Summer Olympics and the 2007 World Championships in Athletics. He subsequently announced his retirement; nonetheless in February 2011 the French Anti-Doping Agency suspended him from competition for one year for failing to submit to periodic anti-doping tests.
