= Tomasz Czubak =

Polish sprinter (born 1973)

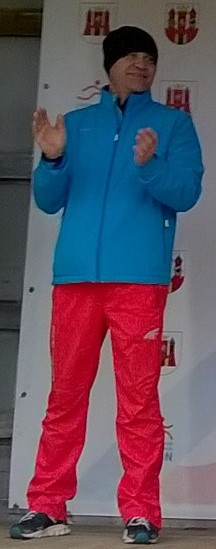

Medal record

Men's Athletics

Representing Poland

World Championships
Gold medal – first place	1999 Seville	4 × 400 m relay
Bronze medal – third place	1997 Athens	4 × 400 m relay

European Championships
Silver medal – second place	1998 Budapest	4 × 400 m relay

Tomasz Czubak (born 16 December 1973 in Słupsk) is a former 400 metres runner from Poland. He won a silver medal in 4 × 400 metres relay at the 1998 European Championships and a gold medal at the 1999 World Championships in Athletics. Running in the 1999 individual contest, he set a personal best and a national record, with 44.62

== Competition record ==
Year	Competition	Venue	Position	Event	Notes
Representing Poland
1991	European Junior Championships	Thessaloniki, Greece	6th	400 m	47.38
1991	European Junior Championships	Thessaloniki, Greece	2nd	4 × 400 m relay	3:08.18
1992	World Junior Championships	Seoul, South Korea	4th	4 × 400 m relay	3:07.01
1994	European Championships	Helsinki, Finland	14th (sf)	400 m	47.05
1994	European Championships	Helsinki, Finland	6th	4 × 400 m relay	3:04.22
1997	World Championships	Athens, Greece	12th (sf)	400 m	45.51
1997	World Championships	Athens, Greece	3rd	4 × 400 m relay	3:00.26
1998	European Indoor Championships	Valencia, Spain	4th	400 metres	47.18
1998	Goodwill Games	Uniondale, United States	1st	4 × 400 m relay	2:58.00 (NR)
1998	European Championships	Budapest, Hungary	4th	400 m	45.43
1998	European Championships	Budapest, Hungary	2nd	4 × 400 m relay	2:58.88
1999	World Indoor Championships	Maebashi, Japan	13th (h)	400 m	47.04
1999	World Championships	Seville, Spain	9th (sf)	400 m	44.62 (NR)
1999	World Championships	Seville, Spain	1st	4 × 400 m relay	2:58.91

== See also ==
- Polish records in athletics
