= Luis Flores (sprinter) =

Spanish sprinter

Personal information
- Full name: Luis Flores Martínez
- Nationality: Spanish
- Born: 5 November 1978 (age 48)
- Height: 1.78 m (5 ft 10 in)
- Weight: 71 kg (157 lb)

Sport
- Sport: Sprinting
- Event: 4 × 400 metres relay

Luis Flores Martínez (born 5 November 1978) is a Spanish sprinter. He competed in the men's 4 × 400 metres relay at the 2004 Summer Olympics.
