= Piotr Haczek =

Polish sprinter (born 1977)

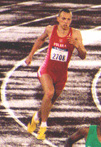
- Piotr Haczek in 2000

Personal information
- Nationality: Polish
- Born: 26 January 1977 (age 49) Żywiec, Poland
- Height: 1.88 m (6 ft 2 in)
- Weight: 72 kg (159 lb)

Sport
- Sport: Athletics
- Events: sprinting, 400 metres
Medal record
Men's Athletics
Representing Poland
World Championships
Gold medal – first place	1999 Seville	4 × 400 m relay
Bronze medal – third place	1997 Athens	4 × 400 m relay
Bronze medal – third place	2001 Edmonton	4 × 400 m relay
World Indoor Championships
Gold medal – first place	2001 Lisbon	4 × 400 m relay
Silver medal – second place	1999 Maebashi	4 × 400 m relay
European Championships
Silver medal – second place	1998 Budapest	4 × 400 m relay

Piotr Haczek (born 26 January 1977 in Żywiec, Śląskie) is a Polish former athlete who mainly competed in the 400 metres. An outdoor and indoor world champion in the 4 × 400 metres relay, his success came mainly in relay, his best individual performance being a gold medal at the 1999 European Under 23 Championships. After retiring from competition he became an athletics coach: among the roles he has held are sports director and head coach of the Polish Athletic Association and sprints coach for Scottish Athletics.

== Personal bests ==
- 100 metres - 10.58 (1998)
- 200 metres - 20.97 (2000)
- 400 metres - 45.43 (2000)

== Achievements ==
Year	Competition	Venue	Position	Event	Notes
Representing Poland
1995	European Junior Championships	Nyíregyháza, Hungary	6th	400 m	47.42
1995	European Junior Championships	Nyíregyháza, Hungary	3rd	4 × 400 m relay	3:09.65
1996	World Junior Championships	Sydney, Australia	5th	400 m	46.29
1996	World Junior Championships	Sydney, Australia	6th	4 × 400 m relay	3:08.04
1996	Olympic Games	Atlanta, United States	6th	4 × 400 m relay	3:00.96
1997	European U23 Championships	Turku, Finland	2nd	400 m	45.72
1997	European U23 Championships	Turku, Finland	1st	4 × 400 m relay	3:03.07
1997	World Championships	Athens, Greece	3rd	4 × 400 m relay	3:00.26
1998	Goodwill Games	Uniondale, United States	2nd	4 × 400 m relay	2:58.00 (NR)
1998	European Championships	Budapest, Hungary	5th	400 m	45.46
1998	European Championships	Budapest, Hungary	2nd	4 × 400 m relay	2:58.88
1999	World Indoor Championships	Maebashi, Japan	2nd	4 × 400 m relay	3:03.01 (iAR)
1999	European U23 Championships	Gothenburg, Sweden	1st	400 m	45.78
1999	European U23 Championships	Gothenburg, Sweden	2nd	4 × 400 m relay	3:03.22
1999	World Championships	Seville, Spain	1st	4 × 400 m relay	2:58.91
2000	Olympic Games	Sydney, Australia	12th (sf)	400 m	45.66
2000	Olympic Games	Sydney, Australia	6th	4 × 400 m relay	3:03.22
2001	World Indoor Championships	Lisbon, Portugal	1st	4 × 400 m relay	3:04.47
2001	World Championships	Edmonton, Canada	3rd	4 × 400 m relay	2:59.71

== See also ==
- Polish records in athletics
