= Boris Gorban =

Russian hurdler (born 1978)

Boris Aleksandrovich Gorban (Russian: Борис Александрович Горбань; born 26 September 1978) is a Russian athlete who ran in the 400 metres hurdles.

Gorban won the silver medal in 4 x 400 metres relay at the 2001 World Indoor Championships, establishing a national record of 3:04.82 minutes together with teammates Aleksandr Ladeyshchikov, Ruslan Mashchenko and Andrey Semyonov. Gorban won another silver medal in relay at the 2004 World Indoor Championships, together with Dmitriy Forshev, Andrey Rudnitskiy and Aleksandr Usov.

He participated at the 2000 and 2004 Summer Olympics without reaching the final.

His personal best time is 48.50 seconds, achieved in the semi-final of the 2001 World Championships in Edmonton. He has not competed on top level since the 2004 season.
