= Ruslan Mashchenko =

Russian hurdler and sprinter

Personal information
- Born: November 11, 1971 (age 54) Voronezh, Soviet Union

Sport
- Country: Russia
- Sport: Athletics
Medal record
Men's athletics
Representing Russia
European Championships
| Silver medal – second place | 1998 Budapest | 400 m hurdles |
| Silver medal – second place | 2002 Munich | 4 × 400 m relay |
World Indoor Championships
| Silver medal – second place | 2001 Lisbon | 4 × 400 m relay |
Summer Universiade
| Silver medal – second place | 1997 Catania | 400 m hurdles |

Ruslan Mikhailovich Mashchenko (Russian: Руслан Михaйлович Мащенко; born November 11, 1971) is a retired hurdler and sprinter from Russia. He is best known for winning two silver medals at the European Athletics Championships during his career (1998 and 2002). Along with Aleksandr Ladeyshchikov, Boris Gorban, and Andrey Semyonov, he won a silver medal in the 4 × 400 m relay at the 2001 World Indoor Championships . He represented his native country in three consecutive Summer Olympics (1996, 2000 and 2004), and set his personal best (48.06 s) in the men's 400 metres hurdles on 13 June 1998 in Helsinki, Finland.
