= 1997 European Athletics U23 Championships =

1st European Athletics U23 Championships
- Dates: 10–13 July 1997
- Host city: Turku, Finland
- Level: U23
- Type: Outdoor
- Events: 43
- Participation: 652 athletes from 37 nations

The 1st European Athletics U23 Championships were held in Turku, Finland on 10–13 July 1997. The competition succeeded the European Athletics U23 Cup, which had been held in 1992 and 1994.

Complete results and medal winners were published.

== Results ==
=== Men ===
Event	Gold		Silver		Bronze	
100 metres	Angelos Pavlakakis; Greece	10.18	Carlos Calado; Portugal	10.29	Marlon Devonish; Great Britain	10.32
200 metres	Julian Golding; Great Britain	20.46	Alessandro Attene; Italy	20.68	Ryszard Pilarczyk; Poland	20.87
400 metres	Mark Hylton; Great Britain	45.71	Piotr Haczek; Poland	45.72	Kjell Provost; Belgium	45.99
800 metres	Andrea Longo; Italy	1:46.49	André Bucher; Switzerland	1:47.13	Grzegorz Krzosek; Poland	1:47.45
1500 metres	Reyes Estévez; Spain	3:42.37	Carlos García; Spain	3:43.24	Alexandru Vasile; Romania	3:43.36
5000 metres	Simone Zanon; Italy	13:45.90	Rachid Berradi; Italy	13:47.08	Sergey Lukin; Russia	13:48.04
10,000 metres	Rachid Berradi; Italy	28:31.12	Serhiy Lebid; Ukraine	28:39.71	Simone Zanon; Italy	28:56.33
110 metres hurdles	Frank Busemann; Germany	13.54	Sven Pieters; Belgium	13.56	Andrey Kislykh; Russia	13.56
400 metres hurdles	Lukáš Souček; Czech Republic	49.08	Marcel Schelbert; Switzerland	49.43	Xavier Ravenet; France	49.63
3000 metres steeplechase	Luciano Di Pardo; Italy	8:34.24	Vincent Le Dauphin; France	8:36.92	Konstantin Tomskiy; Russia	8:37.81
4 × 100 metres relay	Great Britain (GBR); Dan Money; Marlon Devonish; Jamie Henthorn; Julian Golding	38.99	Poland (POL); Marcin Krzywański; Dariusz Adamczyk; Piotr Balcerzak; Ryszard Pilarczyk	39.27	Germany (GER); Alexander Kosenkow; Eduard Martin; Patrik Weimer; Uwe Eisenbeis	39.45
4 × 400 metres relay	Poland (POL); Ryszard Pilarczyk; Piotr Długosielski; Jacek Bocian; Piotr Haczek	3:03.07	Czech Republic (CZE); David Nikodým; Lukáš Souček; Jan Štejfa; Jiří Mužík	3:04.13	Germany (GER); Thomas Goller; Maik Liebe; Lars Figura; Carlos Gachanja	3:04.32
20 kilometres walk	Aigars Fadejevs; Latvia	1:19:58	Paquillo Fernández; Spain	1:21:59	Artur Meliashkevich; Belarus	1:22:26
High jump	Staffan Strand; Sweden	2.28	Martin Buß; Germany	2.24	Marcin Kaczocha; Poland	2.24
Pole vault	Yevgeniy Smiryagin; Russia	5.70	Montxu Miranda; Spain	5.50	Petr Špaček; Czech Republic	5.50
Long jump	Carlos Calado; Portugal	8.32	Kirill Sosunov; Russia	8.30	Olexiy Lukashevych; Ukraine	8.09
Triple jump	Vyacheslav Taranov; Russia	16.95	Marat Safiullin; Russia	16.29	Tayo Erogbobgo; Great Britain	16.28
Shot put	Conny Karlsson; Finland	19.48	Gunnar Pfingsten; Germany	19.11	Andreas Gustafsson; Sweden	19.09
Discus throw	Andrzej Krawczyk; Poland	59.54	Timo Sinervo; Finland	57.20	Kiril Chuprinin; Ukraine	56.78
Hammer throw	Ivan Tsikhan; Belarus	77.46	Szymon Ziółkowski; Poland	73.68	Nikolay Avlasevich; Belarus	72.40
Javelin throw	Pietari Skyttä; Finland	81.58	Matti Närhi; Finland	80.72	Christian Nicolay; Germany	78.18
Decathlon	Klaus Isekenmeier; Germany	7926	Oleksandr Yurkov; Ukraine	7888	Pierre-Alexandre Vial; France	7866

=== Women ===
Event	Gold		Silver		Bronze	
100 metres	Nora Ivanova; Bulgaria	11.50	Esther Möller; Germany	11.53	Marie-Joelle Dogbo; France	11.54
200 metres	Hana Benešová; Czech Republic	22.57	Shanta Ghosh; Germany	22.80	Katia Benth; France	23.19
400 metres	Allison Curbishley; Great Britain	50.85	Hana Benešová; Czech Republic	51.82	Claudia Angerhausen; Germany	53.45
800 metres	Irina Nedelenko; Ukraine	2:01.72	Dorota Fiut; Poland	2:02.44	Lyudmila Goncharova; Russia	2:02.72
1500 metres	Andrea Šuldesová; Czech Republic	4:13.92	Lidia Chojecka; Poland	4:14.70	Natalya Chernyshova; Ukraine	4:15.43
5000 metres	Oksana Zheleznyak; Russia	15:45.22	Cristina Iloc; Romania	15:46.59	Marta Domínguez; Spain	15:49.96
10,000 metres	Olivera Jevtić; Serbia and Montenegro	32:44.22	Annemari Sandell; Finland	32:48.57	Stine Larsen; Norway	33:11.09
100 metres hurdles	Irina Korotya; Russia	12.97	Diane Allahgreen; Great Britain	13.03	Johanna Halkoaho; Finland	13.35
400 metres hurdles	Rikke Rønholt; Denmark	57.22	Vicki Jamison; Great Britain	57.43	Małgorzata Pskit; Poland	57.68
4 × 100 metres relay	Germany (GER); Esther Möller; Shanta Ghosh; Nancy Kette; Silke Eichmann	43.94	Russia (RUS); Yelena Tishkova; Irina Korotya; Olga Maksimova; Yuliya Vertyanova	44.41	Italy (ITA); Elena Apollonio; Elena Sordelli; Manuela Grillo; Manuela Levorato	44.73
4 × 400 metres relay	Great Britain (GBR); Vicki Jamison; Jo Sloane; Jeina Mitchell; Allison Curbishley	3:32.81	Germany (GER); Nicole Marahrens; Shanta Ghosh; Claudia Gesell; Claudia Angerhausen	3:33.77	Czech Republic (CZE); Jitka Burianová; Eva Kasalová; Andrea Šuldesová; Hana Benešová	3:33.83
10 kilometres walk	Olga Panfyorova; Russia	43:33	María Vasco; Spain	44:01	Susana Feitor; Portugal	44:26
High jump	Yuliya Lyakhova; Russia	1.97	Kajsa Bergqvist; Sweden	1.93	Daniela Rath; Germany	1.91
Pole vault	Eszter Szemerédi; Hungary	4.10	Janet Zach; Germany	4.05	Sabine Schulte; Germany; Monique de Wilt; Netherlands	3.80
Long jump	Tatyana Kotova; Russia	6.57	Cristina Nicolau; Romania	6.43	Sofia Schulte; Germany	6.39
Triple jump	Cristina Nicolau; Romania	14.22	Anja Valant; Slovenia	13.98	Heli Koivula; Finland	13.88
Shot put	Nadine Kleinert; Germany	18.27	Corrie de Bruin; Netherlands	18.06	Yanina Karolchyk; Belarus	13.98
Discus throw	Corrie de Bruin; Netherlands	57.72	Kathleen Hering; Germany	56.78	Yanina Karolchyk; Belarus	56.36
Hammer throw	Mihaela Melinte; Romania	70.26	Simone Mathes; Germany	64.38	Lyn Sprules; Great Britain	61.70
Javelin throw	Taina Uppa; Finland	56.48	Alina Serdyuk; Belarus	55.56	Merja Pitkänen; Finland	55.24
Heptathlon	Kathleen Gutjahr; Germany	6130	Yuliya Akulenko; Ukraine	6117	Diana Koritskaya; Russia	6014

== Medal table ==
* Host nation (Finland)

Rank	Nation	Gold	Silver	Bronze	Total
1	Russia	7	3	5	15
2	Germany	5	8	7	20
3	Great Britain	5	2	3	10
4	Italy	4	2	2	8
5	Finland*	3	3	3	9
6	Czech Republic	3	2	2	7
7	Poland	2	5	4	11
8	Romania	2	2	1	5
9	Spain	1	4	1	6
10	Ukraine	1	3	3	7
11	Belarus	1	1	4	6
12	Netherlands	1	1	1	3
12	Portugal	1	1	1	3
12	Sweden	1	1	1	3
15	Bulgaria	1	0	0	1
15	Denmark	1	0	0	1
15	Greece	1	0	0	1
15	Hungary	1	0	0	1
15	Latvia	1	0	0	1
15	Serbia and Montenegro	1	0	0	1
21	Switzerland	0	2	0	2
22	France	0	1	4	5
23	Belgium	0	1	1	2
24	Slovenia	0	1	0	1
25	Norway	0	0	1	1
Totals (25 entries)		43	43	44	130

== Participation ==
According to an unofficial count, 652 athletes from 37 countries participated in the event.

- Albania (2)
- Armenia (1)
- Austria (6)
- Belarus (25)
- Belgium (10)
- Bulgaria (6)
- Croatia (3)
- Cyprus (5)
- Czech Republic (22)
- Denmark (3)
- Estonia (4)
- Finland (34)
- France (47)
- Germany (55)
- Great Britain (31)
- Greece (12)
- Hungary (27)
- Iceland (2)
- Ireland (10)
- Israel (3)
- Italy (48)
- Latvia (7)
- Lithuania (4)
- Netherlands (11)
- Norway (15)
- Poland (39)
- Portugal (10)
- Romania (18)
- Russia (60)
- Slovakia (3)
- Slovenia (9)
- Spain (36)
- Sweden (30)
- Switzerland (10)
- Turkey (10)
- Ukraine (27)
- Yugoslavia (7)
