= 2001 IAAF World Indoor Championships =

8th IAAF World Indoor Championships
- Dates: 9 March–11 March
- Host city: Lisbon, Portugal
- Venue: Pavilhão Atlântico
- Events: 28
- Participation: 511 athletes from 136 nations

The 8th IAAF World Indoor Championships in Athletics were held at the Pavilhão Atlântico in Lisbon, Portugal from March 9 to March 11, 2001. It was the first time the Championships had been held in Portugal. There were a total number of 511 participating athletes from 136 countries.

== Results ==
=== Men ===
1997 | 1999 | 2001 | 2003 | 2004

Event	Gold		Silver		Bronze	
60 m	Tim Harden; United States	6.44	Tim Montgomery; United States	6.46 (PB)	Mark Lewis-Francis; Great Britain	6.51 (PB)
200 m	Shawn Crawford; United States	20.63	Christian Malcolm; Great Britain	20.76	Patrick van Balkom; Netherlands	20.96
400 m	Daniel Caines; Great Britain	46.40	Milton Campbell; United States	46.45	Danny McFarlane; Jamaica	46.74
800 m	Yuriy Borzakovskiy; Russia	1:44.49	Johan Botha; South Africa	1:45.87	André Bucher; Switzerland	1:46.46
1500 m	Rui Silva; Portugal	3:51.06	Reyes Estévez; Spain	3:51.25	Noah Ngeny; Kenya	3:51.63
3000 m	Hicham El Guerrouj; Morocco	7:37.74	Mohammed Mourhit; Belgium	7:38.94 (NR)	Alberto García; Spain	7:39.96 (PB)
60 m hurdles	Terrence Trammell; United States	7.51	Anier García; Cuba	7.54	Shaun Bownes; South Africa	7.55
High jump	Stefan Holm; Sweden	2.32	Andriy Sokolovsky; Ukraine	2.29	Staffan Strand; Sweden	2.29
Pole vault	Lawrence Johnson; United States	5.95	Tye Harvey; United States	5.90	Romain Mesnil; France	5.85
Long jump	Iván Pedroso; Cuba	8.43	Kareem Streete; Cayman Islands	8.16 (NR)	Carlos Calado; Portugal	8.16 (NR)
Triple jump	Paolo Camossi; Italy	17.32 (NR)	Jonathan Edwards; Great Britain	17.26	Andrew Murphy; Australia	17.20 (AR)
Shot put	John Godina; United States	20.82	Adam Nelson; United States	20.72	Manuel Martínez; Spain	20.67
4 × 400 m relay	Poland (POL); Piotr Rysiukiewicz; Piotr Haczek; Jacek Bocian; Robert Maćkowiak	3:04.47	Russia (RUS); Aleksandr Ladeyshchikov; Ruslan Mashchenko; Boris Gorban; Andrey Semyonov; Dmitriy Forshev*	3:04.82 (NR)	Jamaica (JAM); Michael McDonald; Davian Clarke; Michael Blackwood; Danny McFarlane; Gregory Haughton*	3:05.45
Heptathlon	Roman Šebrle; Czech Republic	6420	Jón Magnússon; Iceland	6233	Lev Lobodin; Russia	6202

=== Women ===
1997 | 1999 | 2001 | 2003 | 2004

Event	Gold		Silver		Bronze	
60 m	Chandra Sturrup; Bahamas	7.05 (PB)	Angela Williams; United States	7.09 (PB)	Chryste Gaines; United States	7.12
200 m	Juliet Campbell; Jamaica	22.64	LaTasha Jenkins; United States	22.96 (PB)	Natalya Safronnikova; Belarus	23.17
400 m	Sandie Richards; Jamaica	51.04	Olga Kotlyarova; Russia	51.56	Olesya Zykina; Russia	51.71
800 m	Maria Mutola; Mozambique	1:59.74	Stephanie Graf; Austria	1:59.78	Helena Dziurova; Czech Republic	2.01.18
1500 m	Hasna Benhassi; Morocco	4:10.83	Violeta Beclea; Romania	4:11.17	Natalya Gorelova; Russia	4:11.74
3000 m	Olga Yegorova; Russia	8:37.48 (NR)	Gabriela Szabo; Romania	8:39.65	Yelena Zadorozhnaya; Russia	8:40.15 (PB)
60 m hurdles	Anjanette Kirkland; United States	7.85 (PB)	Michelle Freeman; Jamaica	7.92	Nicole Ramalalanirina; France	7.96
High jump	Kajsa Bergqvist; Sweden	2.00	Inga Babakova; Ukraine	2.00	Venelina Veneva; Bulgaria	1.96
Pole vault	Pavla Rybová; Czech Republic	4.56 (CR)	Svetlana Feofanova; Russia; Kellie Suttle; United States	4.51	Not awarded	
Long jump	Dawn Burrell; United States	7.03	Tatyana Kotova; Russia	6.98	Niurka Montalvo; Spain	6.88 (NR)
Triple jump	Tereza Marinova; Bulgaria	14.91 (PB)	Tatyana Lebedeva; Russia	14.85	Tiombe Hurd; United States	14.19 (PB)
Shot put	Larisa Peleshenko; Russia	19.84	Nadzeya Astapchuk; Belarus	19.24 (PB)	Svetlana Krivelyova; Russia	19.18
4 × 400 m relay	Russia (RUS); Yuliya Nosova; Olesya Zykina; Yuliya Sotnikova; Olga Kotlyarova	3:30.00	Jamaica (JAM); Charmaine Howell; Juliet Campbell; Catherine Scott; Sandie Richards	3:30.79	Germany (GER); Claudia Marx; Birgit Rockmeier; Florence Ekpo-Umoh; Shanta Ghosh	3:31.00
Pentathlon	Natalya Sazanovich; Belarus	4850 (CR)	Yelena Prokhorova; Russia	4711	Karin Ertl; Germany	4678

== Medals table ==
Rank	Nation	Gold	Silver	Bronze	Total
1	United States	7	7	2	16
2	Russia	4	6	5	15
3	Jamaica	2	2	2	6
4	Czech Republic	2	0	1	3
4	Sweden	2	0	1	3
6	Morocco	2	0	0	2
7	Great Britain	1	2	1	4
8	Belarus	1	1	1	3
9	Cuba	1	1	0	2
10	Bulgaria	1	0	1	2
10	Portugal	1	0	1	2
12	Bahamas	1	0	0	1
12	Italy	1	0	0	1
12	Mozambique	1	0	0	1
12	Poland	1	0	0	1
16	Romania	0	2	0	2
16	Ukraine	0	2	0	2
18	Spain	0	1	3	4
19	South Africa	0	1	1	2
20	Austria	0	1	0	1
20	Belgium	0	1	0	1
20	Cayman Islands	0	1	0	1
20	Iceland	0	1	0	1
24	France	0	0	2	2
24	Germany	0	0	2	2
26	Australia	0	0	1	1
26	Kenya	0	0	1	1
26	Netherlands	0	0	1	1
26	Switzerland	0	0	1	1
Totals (29 entries)		28	29	27	84

== Participating nations ==
- Albania (1)
- Algeria (3)
- Andorra (1)
- Anguilla (1)
- Antigua and Barbuda (1)
- Armenia (1)
- Aruba (1)
- Australia (8)
- Austria (5)
- Azerbaijan (1)
- Bahamas (4)
- Barbados (1)
- Bahrain (1)
- Belarus (8)
- Belgium (7)
- Bolivia (1)
- Botswana (1)
- Brazil (4)
- Bulgaria (6)
- Burkina Faso (1)
- Cameroon (1)
- Canada (9)
- Cape Verde (1)
- Cayman Islands (1)
- Central African Republic (1)
- Chad (1)
- Chile (1)
- China (12)
- Chinese Taipei (1)
- Costa Rica (1)
- Ivory Coast (1)
- Croatia (3)
- Cuba (10)
- Cyprus (1)
- Czech Republic (8)
- Denmark (1)
- Dominican Republic (1)
- Egypt (1)
- Equatorial Guinea (1)
- Eritrea (1)
- Estonia (1)
- Ethiopia (4)
- France (14)
- Finland (1)
- Gabon (1)
- Georgia (1)
- Germany (16)
- Ghana (1)
- Great Britain (17)
- Greece (11)
- Guatemala (1)
- Guyana (1)
- Haiti (3)
- Honduras (1)
- Hong Kong (1)
- Hungary (4)
- Iceland (1)
- Ireland (5)
- Israel (4)
- Italy (12)
- Jamaica (15)
- Japan (4)
- Kazakhstan (4)
- Kenya (6)
- Kyrgyzstan (1)
- Kuwait (4)
- Laos (1)
- Latvia (3)
- Lebanon (1)
- Lesotho (1)
- Liberia (1)
- Lithuania (1)
- Madagascar (1)
- Maldives (1)
- Malaysia (1)
- Mali (1)
- Malta (1)
- Mauritius (1)
- Mexico (1)
- Moldova (2)
- Morocco (7)
- Mozambique (2)
- Nepal (1)
- Netherlands (3)
- New Zealand (1)
- Niger (1)
- Nigeria (8)
- Norfolk Island (1)
- Oman (1)
- Pakistan (1)
- Palestine (1)
- Panama (1)
- Papua New Guinea (1)
- Paraguay (1)
- Philippines (1)
- Poland (9)
- Portugal (17)
- Puerto Rico (1)
- Republic of the Congo (1)
- Romania (11)
- Russia (46)
- El Salvador (1)
- Samoa (1)
- San Marino (2)
- São Tomé and Príncipe (1)
- Saudi Arabia (1)
- Senegal (1)
- Seychelles (1)
- Sierra Leone (1)
- Slovakia (1)
- Slovenia (7)
- Solomon Islands (1)
- South Africa (4)
- South Korea (1)
- Spain (18)
- Sri Lanka (4)
- Sudan (1)
- Swaziland (1)
- Sweden (6)
- Switzerland (3)
- Syria (1)
- Tajikistan (1)
- Tanzania (1)
- Thailand (1)
- Trinidad and Tobago (1)
- Tunisia (2)
- Turkey (4)
- Turkmenistan (2)
- Uganda (1)
- Ukraine (14)
- United States (45)
- Uruguay (1)
- Uzbekistan (2)
- Yugoslavia (1)
- Zambia (1)
- Zimbabwe (1)

== See also ==
- 2001 in athletics (track and field)
