= Marcel Lopuchovský =

Slovak athlete

Personal information
- Nationality: Slovak
- Born: 2 May 1977 (age 49) Košice, Czechoslovakia
- Height: 1.87 m (6 ft 2 in)
- Weight: 95 kg (209 lb)

Sport
- Country: Slovakia
- Sport: Bobsleigh

Marcel Lopuchovský (born 2 May 1977) is a former Slovak bobsledder and sprinter who works as a fitness and Olympics coach.

== Early life ==
Lopuchovský was born on 2 May 1977 in Košice. He did athletics for a maximum of twelve years and learnt how to sprint quickly. Lopuchovský developed an interest in bobsleigh after watching Cool Runnings. He was offered to try the sport whilst in Königssee, Germany.

== Career ==
=== Sprinter ===
As a sprinter, Lopuchovský debuted at the 2000 Summer Olympics as a member of the Slovak 4x400m relay team. He later competed at the 2002 IAAF World Cup, finishing fourth place with 400 m heats and ran a personal record of 47.40 in Vienna. Lopuchovský went on to finish fifth place during the 400 m event in Szombathely.

=== Bobsleigh ===
At the 2008–09 Bobsleigh World Cup, Lopuchovský teamed up with Milan Jagnešák in the two-man bobsleigh, finishing eighth place.

During the seventh round of 2009–10 Bobsleigh World Cup, Lopuchovský teamed up with Jagnešák, David Rolet, and Andrej Benda in the four-man bobsleigh category. They finished the worst position at 29th place.

At the 2010 Winter Olympics, Lopuchovský crashed out during the first run of the four-man event.
