= Andrey Semyonov (sprinter) =

Russian sprinter

Personal information
- Nationality: Russian
- Born: 16 August 1977 (age 49) Leningrad, Soviet Union

Sport
- Country: Russia
- Sport: Sprinting
- Event: 4 × 400 metres relay
Medal record
Men's athletics
Representing Russia
World Indoor Championships
Silver medal – second place	2001 Lisbon	4x400 m relay
European Championships
Silver medal – second place	2002 Munich	4x400 m relay
Summer Universiade
Silver medal – second place	2003 Daegu	4x400 m relay

Andrey Semyonov (born 16 August 1977) is a Russian sprinter. He competed in the men's 4 × 400 metres relay at the 2000 Summer Olympics.
