= 2007 World Championships in Athletics – Men's 400 metres hurdles =

Men's 400 metres hurdles at the 2007 World Championships
- Venue: Nagai Stadium
- Dates: 25 August (heats); 26 August (semifinals); 28 August (final)
- Competitors: 37
- Winning time: 47.61

Medalists
| gold medal | Kerron Clement; United States |
| silver medal | Félix Sánchez; Dominican Republic |
| bronze medal | Marek Plawgo; Poland |

The men's 400 metres hurdles at the 2007 World Championships in Athletics was held at the Nagai Stadium on 25, 26 and 28 August.

== Medalists ==
| Gold | Silver | Bronze |
|---|---|---|
| Kerron Clement; United States | Félix Sánchez; Dominican Republic | Marek Plawgo; Poland |

== Records ==
Prior to the competition, the records were as follows.

| World record | Kevin Young (USA) | 46.78 | Barcelona, Spain | 6 August 1992 |
| Championship record | Kevin Young (USA) | 47.18 | Stuttgart, Germany | 19 August 1993 |
| World leading | James Carter (USA) | 47.72 | Indianapolis, United States | 23 June 2007 |
| African record | Samuel Matete (ZAM) | 47.10 | Zürich, Switzerland | 7 August 1991 |
| Asian record | Hadi Soua'an Al-Somaily (KSA) | 47.53 | Sydney, Australia | 27 September 2000 |
| North American record | Kevin Young (USA) | 46.78 | Barcelona, Spain | 6 August 1992 |
| South American record | Bayano Kamani (PAN) | 47.84 | Helsinki, Finland | 7 August 2005 |
| European record | Stéphane Diagana (FRA) | 47.37 | Lausanne, Switzerland | 5 July 1995 |
| Oceanian record | Rohan Robinson (AUS) | 48.28 | Atlanta, United States | 31 July 1996 |

== Schedule ==
| Date | Time | Round |
|---|---|---|
| August 25, 2007 | 20:45 | Heats |
| August 26, 2007 | 21:45 | Semifinals |
| August 28, 2007 | 22:20 | Final |

== Results ==
| KEY: | q | Fastest non-qualifiers | Q | Qualified | WR | World record | AR | Area record | NR | National record | PB | Personal best | SB | Seasonal best |

=== Heats ===
Qualification: First 4 in each heat (Q) and the next 4 fastest (q) advance to the semifinals.

| Rank | Heat | Name | Nationality | Time | Notes |
|---|---|---|---|---|---|
| 1 | 5 | Félix Sánchez | Dominican Republic | 48.70 | Q, SB |
| 2 | 5 | Bershawn Jackson | United States | 48.87 | Q |
| 3 | 3 | Danny McFarlane | Jamaica | 48.91 | Q |
| 4 | 5 | Kenji Narisako | Japan | 48.92 | Q, SB |
| 5 | 4 | Adam Kunkel | Canada | 49.03 | Q |
| 6 | 3 | Kerron Clement | United States | 49.07 | Q |
| 7 | 3 | Javier Culson | Puerto Rico | 49.09 | Q |
| 8 | 4 | Periklis Iakovakis | Greece | 49.10 | Q |
| 9 | 4 | Pieter de Villiers | South Africa | 49.24 | Q |
| 10 | 5 | Isa Phillips | Jamaica | 49.38 | Q |
| 11 | 4 | Fadil Bellaabouss | France | 49.51 | Q |
| 12 | 2 | James Carter | United States | 49.52 | Q |
| 13 | 5 | Ibrahima Maïga | Mali | 49.55 | q |
| 14 | 4 | Jonathan Williams | Belize | 49.61 | q |
| 15 | 5 | Joseph Abraham | India | 49.64 | q |
| 16 | 1 | Derrick Williams | United States | 49.65 | Q |
| 17 | 1 | Marek Plawgo | Poland | 49.66 | Q |
| 17 | 1 | Meng Yan | China | 49.66 | Q |
| 17 | 3 | Edivaldo Monteiro | Portugal | 49.66 | Q |
| 17 | 3 | Aleksandr Derevyagin | Russia | 49.66 | q |
| 21 | 2 | Bayano Kamani | Panama | 49.67 | Q |
| 21 | 3 | Dai Tamesue | Japan | 49.67 | |
| 23 | 1 | L. J. van Zyl | South Africa | 49.71 | |
| 24 | 2 | Gianni Carabelli | Italy | 49.81 | Q |
| 25 | 2 | Yevgeniy Meleshenko | Kazakhstan | 49.94 | Q |
| 26 | 3 | Dale Garland | United Kingdom | 49.98 | |
| 27 | 2 | Kurt Couto | Mozambique | 50.06 | |
| 28 | 1 | Raphael Fernandes | Brazil | 50.33 | |
| 29 | 2 | Masahira Yoshikata | Japan | 50.59 | |
| 30 | 5 | José María Romera | Spain | 50.82 | |
| 31 | 5 | Nawaz Haq | Pakistan | 51.72 | PB |
| 32 | 1 | Allan Ayala Acevedo | Guatemala | 52.26 | |
| 33 | 4 | Mowen Boino | Papua New Guinea | 52.45 | |
| 34 | 1 | Jonnie Lowe | Honduras | 52.66 | |
| | 1 | Naman Keïta | France | | DSQ |
| | 2 | Alwyn Myburgh | South Africa | | DNF |
| | 4 | Markino Buckley | Jamaica | | DNF |
| | 4 | Ali Obaid Shirook | United Arab Emirates | | DNS |

=== Semifinals ===
Qualification: First 2 in each semifinal (Q) and the next 2 fastest (q) advance to the final.

| Rank | Heat | Name | Nationality | Time | Notes |
|---|---|---|---|---|---|
| 1 | 1 | Marek Plawgo | Poland | 48.18 | Q, SB |
| 2 | 1 | James Carter | United States | 48.30 | Q |
| 3 | 1 | Danny McFarlane | Jamaica | 48.32 | q, SB |
| 4 | 2 | Félix Sánchez | Dominican Republic | 48.35 | Q, SB |
| 5 | 1 | Derrick Williams | United States | 48.43 | q |
| 6 | 1 | Kenji Narisako | Japan | 48.44 | SB |
| 6 | 2 | Periklis Iakovakis | Greece | 48.44 | Q |
| 8 | 3 | Kerron Clement | United States | 48.60 | Q |
| 9 | 3 | Adam Kunkel | Canada | 48.66 | Q |
| 10 | 2 | Bershawn Jackson | United States | 48.95 | |
| 11 | 2 | Aleksandr Derevyagin | Russia | 49.11 | PB |
| 12 | 3 | Bayano Kamani | Panama | 49.13 | |
| 13 | 1 | Fadil Bellaabouss | France | 49.17 | PB |
| 14 | 2 | Edivaldo Monteiro | Portugal | 49.31 | SB |
| 15 | 2 | Pieter de Villiers | South Africa | 49.37 | |
| 16 | 3 | Isa Phillips | Jamaica | 49.47 | |
| 17 | 1 | Joseph Abraham | India | 49.51 | NR |
| 18 | 1 | Yevgeniy Meleshenko | Kazakhstan | 49.56 | SB |
| 19 | 2 | Javier Culson | Puerto Rico | 49.64 | |
| 20 | 2 | Meng Yan | China | 49.70 | |
| 21 | 3 | Jonathan Williams | Belize | 49.77 | |
| 22 | 3 | Gianni Carabelli | Italy | 50.35 | |
| 23 | 3 | Ibrahima Maïga | Mali | 51.24 | |
| | 3 | Naman Keïta | France | | DSQ |

=== Final ===
| Rank | Name | Nationality | Time | Notes |
|---|---|---|---|---|
| 1st place, gold medalist(s) | Kerron Clement | United States | 47.61 | WL |
| 2nd place, silver medalist(s) | Félix Sánchez | Dominican Republic | 48.01 | SB |
| 3rd place, bronze medalist(s) | Marek Plawgo | Poland | 48.12 | NR |
| 4 | James Carter | United States | 48.40 | |
| 5 | Danny McFarlane | Jamaica | 48.59 | |
| 6 | Periklis Iakovakis | Greece | 49.25 | |
| 7 | Derrick Williams | United States | 52.97 | |
| | Adam Kunkel | Canada | | DNF |
