= Athletics at the 2010 Asian Games – Men's 400 metres hurdles =

Men's 400 metres hurdles at the 2010 Asian Games
- Venue: Aoti Main Stadium
- Dates: 24–25 November 2010
- Competitors: 12 from 10 nations

Medalists
gold medal	Joseph Abraham	India
silver medal	Bandar Sharahili	Saudi Arabia
bronze medal	Naohiro Kawakita	Japan

The men's 400 metres hurdles event at the 2010 Asian Games was held at the Aoti Main Stadium, Guangzhou, China on 24–25 November.

== Schedule ==
All times are China Standard Time (UTC+08:00)

Date	Time	Event
Wednesday, 24 November 2010	09:55	Round 1
Thursday, 25 November 2010	19:10	Final

== Records ==
Prior to this competition, the existing world, Asian and Games records were as follows.

World Record	Kevin Young (USA)	46.78	Barcelona, Spain	6 August 1992
Asian Record	Hadi Soua'an Al-Somaily (KSA)	47.53	Sydney, Australia	27 September 2000
Games Record	Hadi Soua'an Al-Somaily (KSA)	48.42	Busan, South Korea	8 October 2002

== Results ==
Legend

- DNF — Did not finish
- DNS — Did not start
- DSQ — Disqualified

=== Round 1 ===
- Qualification: First 3 in each heat (Q) and the next 2 fastest (q) advance to the final.

==== Heat 1 ====
Rank	Athlete	Time	Notes
1	Naohiro Kawakita (JPN)	51.01	Q
2	Meng Yan (CHN)	51.32	Q
3	Viktor Leptikov (KAZ)	51.64	Q
4	Lee Seung-yoon (KOR)	53.56	
5	Nitat Kaewkhong (THA)	55.87	
—	Fawaz Al-Shammari (IOC)	DNS	

==== Heat 2 ====
Rank	Athlete	Time	Notes
1	Kenji Narisako (JPN)	50.15	Q
2	Joseph Abraham (IND)	50.93	Q
5	Bandar Sharahili (KSA)	51.53	Q
7	Yevgeniy Meleshenko (KAZ)	51.67	q
8	Mubarak Al-Nubi (QAT)	51.82	q
—	Abdullah Al-Hidi (OMA)	DNF	

=== Final ===
Rank	Athlete	Time	Notes
1st place, gold medalist(s)	Joseph Abraham (IND)	49.96	
2nd place, silver medalist(s)	Bandar Sharahili (KSA)	50.29	
3rd place, bronze medalist(s)	Naohiro Kawakita (JPN)	50.37	
4	Yevgeniy Meleshenko (KAZ)	51.34	
5	Viktor Leptikov (KAZ)	52.45	
—	Kenji Narisako (JPN)	DSQ	
—	Mubarak Al-Nubi (QAT)	DNS	
—	Meng Yan (CHN)	DNS	
