= 2002 Asian Athletics Championships – Men's 400 metres hurdles =

The men's 400 metres hurdles event at the 2002 Asian Athletics Championships was held in Colombo, Sri Lanka on 10–12 August.

== Medalists ==
Gold	Silver	Bronze
Mubarak Al-Nubi; Qatar	Hideaki Kawamura; Japan	Yevgeniy Meleshenko; Kazakhstan

== Results ==
=== Heats ===
Rank	Heat	Name	Nationality	Time	Notes
1	1	Mubarak Al-Nubi	Qatar	50.72	Q
2	2	Hideaki Kawamura	Japan	50.92	Q
3	2	Yevgeniy Meleshenko	Kazakhstan	51.38	Q
4	1	Yoshihiro Chiba	Japan	51.58	Q
5	2	Asoka Jayasundara	Sri Lanka	51.73	Q
6	1	Apisit Kuttiyawan	Thailand	51.81	Q, SB
7	1	Harijan Ratnayake	Sri Lanka	52.09	q
8	2	Chen Tien-Wen	Chinese Taipei	53.02	q
9	2	Nguyen Bao Huy	Vietnam	54.54	SB
10	1	Suranga Adikari	Sri Lanka	54.81	SB
11	2	Baymurat Ashirmuradov	Turkmenistan	54.92	
12	2	Wong Kai Tung	Hong Kong	55.44	PB
	1	Bader Abdulrahman Aman	Kuwait	DNF	

=== Final ===
Rank	Name	Nationality	Time	Notes
1st place, gold medalist(s)	Mubarak Al-Nubi	Qatar	48.67	
2nd place, silver medalist(s)	Hideaki Kawamura	Japan	48.85	SB
3rd place, bronze medalist(s)	Yevgeniy Meleshenko	Kazakhstan	49.56	
4	Yoshihiro Chiba	Japan	50.24	
5	Asoka Jayasundara	Sri Lanka	50.78	
	Apisit Kuttiyawan	Thailand	DNF	
	Harijan Ratnayake	Sri Lanka	DNS	
	Chen Tien-Wen	Chinese Taipei	DNS	
