= Pogorelov =

Pogorelov (Russian: Погорелов) is a Russian surname. The feminine gender is Pogorelova. Notable people with the surname include:

- Aleksandr Pogorelov (athlete) (born 1980), Russian decathlete
- Aleksei Pogorelov (1919–2002), Soviet mathematician
- Aleksey Pogorelov (born 1983), Kyrgyz hurdler
- Serguei Pogorelov (born 1974), Russian team handball player
