= 2007 USA Outdoor Track and Field Championships =

- Dates: June 20–24
- Host city: Indianapolis, Indiana
- Venue: IU Michael A. Carroll Track & Soccer Stadium
- Level: Senior
- Type: Outdoor
- Events: 40 (men: 20; women: 20)

The 2007 USA Outdoor Track and Field Championships was organised by USA Track & Field and held from June 20 to 24 at the IU Michael A. Carroll Track & Soccer Stadium in Indianapolis, Indiana. The four-day competition served as the national championships in track and field for the United States and also the trials for the 2007 World Championships in Athletics.

It was the fifth time that the stadium in Indianapolis had held the combined gender national track and field event, and the second time consecutively following its hosting of the 2006 edition. The USA Junior Championships were held in conjunction with the event and Rynell Parson set a world youth best of 10.22 to win the men's 100 m.

Athletes who finished in the top three of their event and held the IAAF qualifying standard were eligible to represent the United States at the 2007 World Championships. The United States was able to send three athletes per event to the competition, excluding any American reigning world champions, who received automatic qualification separate from the national selection. The World Championships national selection for the marathon and 50 kilometres walk were incorporated into the discrete national championship meets for those events. Selection for the relay races were made by committee.

Eight Americans went on to win an individual gold medal at the 2007 World Championships. Double sprint national champion Tyson Gay (the only athlete to win two national titles that year) repeated that feat with 100 m and 200 m world title wins. The 5000 m national champion Bernard Lagat won both that event and the 1500 m at the World Championships. Gay, Lagat, Brad Walker, Reese Hoffa, and Allyson Felix were the five athletes to win both national and world titles that year. Jeremy Wariner and Michelle Perry defended their world titles despite not winning their specialities nationally that year. Kerron Clement was runner-up in the men's 400 m hurdles in Indianapolis, but was unmatched at the World Championships in Osaka.

Several athletes extended their unbeaten runs at national level. Khadevis Robinson had a third straight win in the men's 800 m. Men's javelin thrower Breaux Greer had an eighth straight win. Treniere Clement had her third win over 1500 m, while Dana Pounds brought an end to Kim Kreiner's unbeaten run in the women's javelin, which dated back to 2004.

== Results ==
Key: ≠ Not selected for World Championships in Athletics due to failure to reach IAAF qualifying standard within the specified time limit.

=== Men track events ===
Event	Gold		Silver		Bronze	
100 meters	Tyson Gay	9.84 MR	Trindon Holliday	10.07	Walter Dix	10.09
200 meters	Tyson Gay	19.62 MR	Wallace Spearmon	19.89	Rodney Martin	20.18
400 meters	Angelo Taylor	44.05	LaShawn Merritt	44.06	Lionel Larry	44.84
800 meters	Khadevis Robinson	1:44.37	Nick Symmonds	1:45.17	Duane Solomon	1:45.69
1500 meters	Alan Webb	3:34.82 MR	Leonel Manzano	3:35.29	Bernard Lagat	3:35.55
5000 meters	Bernard Lagat	13:30.73	Matt Tegenkamp	13:31.31	Adam Goucher	13:31.50
10,000 meters	Abdihakem Abdirahman	28:13.51	Galen Rupp	28:23.31	Dathan Ritzenhein	28:31.88
110 m hurdles	Terrence Trammell	13.08	Dominique Arnold	13.17	David Oliver	13.18
400 m hurdles	James Carter	47.72	Kerron Clement	47.80	Derrick Williams	48.26
3000 m s'chase	Joshua McAdams	8:24.46	Aaron Aguayo	8:27.01	Tom Brooks	8:27.34
20 km walk	Kevin Eastler	1:26:43.28	Tim Seaman	1:28:17.82	Matthew Boyles≠	1:28:40.20

=== Men field events ===
Event	Gold		Silver		Bronze	
High jump	Jim Dilling	2.27 m	Jamie Nieto	2.24 m	Not awarded	
High jump	Jim Dilling	2.27 m	Adam Shunk≠	2.24 m	Not awarded	
Pole vault	Brad Walker	5.70 m	Jeff Hartwig	5.70 m	Jacob Pauli	5.70 m
Long jump	Dwight Phillips	8.36 m	Miguel Pate	8.24 m	Trevell Quinley	8.24 m
Triple jump	Aarik Wilson	17.06 m	Lawrence Willis	16.97 m	Marc Kellman≠	16.74 m
Shot put	Reese Hoffa	21.47 m	Dan Taylor	21.00 m	Adam Nelson	20.54 m
Discus throw	Michael Robertson	64.04 m	Ian Waltz	63.60 m	Jarred Rome	63.56 m
Hammer throw	A. G. Kruger	78.10 m	Kibwe Johnson	75.12 m	Thomas Freeman≠	74.39 m
Javelin throw	Breaux Greer	91.29 m AR NR	Mike Hazle≠	75.06 m	Justin St. Clair≠	74.71 m
Decathlon	Tom Pappas	8352 pts	Paul Terek	8064 pts	Jake Arnold	7921 pts

=== Women track events ===
Event	Gold		Silver		Bronze	
100 meters	Torri Edwards	11.02	Lauryn Williams	11.16	Carmelita Jeter	11.17
200 meters	Allyson Felix	22.34	Sanya Richards	22.43	Torri Edwards	22.55
400 meters	DeeDee Trotter	49.64	Natasha Hastings	49.84	Mary Wineberg	50.24
800 meters	Alysia Johnson	1:59.47	Hazel Clark	1:59.60	Alice Schmidt	1:59.63
1500 meters	Treniere Clement	4:07.04	Christin Wurth	4:07.86	Erin Donohue	4:08.22
5000 meters	Shalane Flanagan	14:51.75	Jennifer Rhines	15:08.53	Michelle Sikes	15:09.28
10,000 meters	Deena Kastor	31:57.00	Kara Goucher	32:33.80	Katie McGregor	32:44.69
100 m hurdles	Virginia Powell	12.63	Michelle Perry	12.72	Lolo Jones	12.79
400 m hurdles	Tiffany Williams	53.28	Sheena Johnson	53.29	Nicole Leach	54.49
3000 m s'chase	Jennifer Barringer	9:34.64	Anna Willard	9:34.72	Lindsey Anderson	9:40.74
20 km walk	Teresa Vaill	1:37:28.70	Jolene Moore≠	1:39:24.14	Samantha Cohen≠	1:40:53.23

=== Women field events ===
Event	Gold		Silver		Bronze	
High jump	Amy Acuff	1.89 m	Sharon Day≠	1.89 m	Destinee Hooker≠	1.86 m
Pole vault	Jennifer Stuczynski	4.45 m	Niki McEwen	4.45 m	Lacy Janson Jillian Schwartz	4.35 m
Long jump	Grace Upshaw	6.74 m	Brittney Reese	6.67 m	Rose Richmond	6.60 m
Triple jump	Shani Marks	14.08 m	Yvette Lewis≠	13.59 m	Erica McLain≠	13.57 m
Shot put	Kristin Heaston	18.74 m	Jillian Camarena	18.50 m	Sarah Stevens	18.02 m
Discus throw	Suzy Powell	60.63 m	Becky Breisch	59.89 m	Summer Pierson≠	56.79 m
Hammer throw	Brittany Riley	72.41 m	Kristal Yush	68.24 m	Jessica Cosby	68.21 m
Javelin throw	Dana Pounds	59.65 m	Kim Kreiner≠	58.17 m	Anna Raynor≠	53.77 m
Heptathlon	Hyleas Fountain	6090 pts	Diana Pickler	6029 pts	Virginia Johnson	6002 pts

== World Championships qualification ==
=== Automatic byes ===
A total of ten American athletes received automatic byes into the 2007 World Championships in Athletics as a result of their being the defending champions from the 2005 World Championships in Athletics. Justin Gatlin was the reigning world champion in the men's 100 m and 200 m but was ineligible for competition due to a doping ban.

- Lauryn Williams: women's 100 meters
- Allyson Felix: women's 200 meters
- Jeremy Wariner: men's 400 meters
- Michelle Perry: women's 100 m hurdles
- Bershawn Jackson: men's 400 m hurdles
- Dwight Phillips: men's long jump
- Tianna Madison: women's long jump
- Walter Davis: men's triple jump
- Adam Nelson: men's shot put
- Bryan Clay: men's decathlon

=== Non-top three selections ===
College runners Trindon Holliday and Walter Dix, who both placed top three in the men's 100 m opted not to compete at the World Championships, with fourth and fifth placers Mark Jelks and J-Mee Samuels taking their places. Joint runner-up in the men's high jump, Adam Shunk, did not achieve the qualifying mark and fourth place Jesse Williams was selected instead. Eight place finisher in the men's javelin, Eric Brown, was one of only two Americans with the qualifying standard and thus gained selection.

As Dwight Phillips won the national long jump while receiving a bye as defending world champion, the fourth placer Walter Davis was the United States' fourth selection for that event. Kenta Bell – who finished third but failed a doping test at the championships – was the fourth choice for the men's triple jump (in which Davis was defending champion) as he was the only other American with the standard and his three-month doping ban expired before the World Championships. Noah Bryant was fourth in the men's shot put and gained selection due to reigning world champion Adam Nelson's bye.

Allyson Felix was fourth in the 100 m but gained selection as Lauryn Williams already qualified as world champion. LaShauntea Moore entered the 200 m on the same basis, due to Felix's own world champion bye, while 100 m hurdles fourth placer Nichole Denby benefited from Michelle Perry's bye.

Erin Aldrich was only seventh in the women's high jump, but took America's second spot as the only other athlete with the standard. Joint third placers in the pole vault, Lacy Janson and Jillian Schwartz had both achieved a qualifying mark of 4.50 m that year, but selectors opted to choose Schwartz for the national team. Cecilia Barnes, fourth place in the women's discus, got preference over third place Summer Pierson due to the former having the standard.
