= Derrick Williams (hurdler) =

American track and field athlete (born 1982)

Derrick Williams (born March 25, 1982) is an American former track and field athlete who competed in the 400-meter hurdles. He was a finalist at the 2007 World Championships in Athletics and holds a personal record of 48.26 seconds.

== Career ==
Williams attended GlenOak High School in Stark County, Ohio and took part in track while there. After graduating in 2001 he went on to attend junior college at Barton Community College. Working with coach Lance Brauman (who also trained fellow African-American athlete Tyson Gay), he became the national junior college champion in the 110-meter hurdles in 2001 before going on to take the 400 m hurdles title two years later.

After leaving college he failed to improve over the 2004 and 2005 seasons, but after a move to Fayetteville, Arkansas in 2006 he improved his personal record to 48.68 seconds. This ranked him twelfth in the world for the event that year. He also won at the Adidas Track Classic that year. In spite of this, he did not finish his race at the 2006 USA Outdoor Track and Field Championships so did not progress nationally.

The peak of Williams' career came in 2007. That year he placed third at the 2007 USA Outdoor Track and Field Championships behind James Carter and Kerron Clement in a lifetime best of 48.26 seconds. On the circuit he won at the Kingston meet, was third at the Reebok Grand Prix in New York. Having made the American team for the 2007 World Championships in Athletics, he won his first heat, then successfully progressed through the semi-finals. All three Americans – Williams, Clement and Carter – were in the final. Williams was the slowest of the three, fading in the latter stages of the race to finish seventh. Williams ranked within the global top ten that season.

Williams failed to build on his global debut and his career went into decline in the 2008 season. He was eliminated in the 2008 United States Olympic Trials at the quarter-finals stage and recorded a season's best of 49.75 seconds for fourth at the adidas Track Classic. He ranked outside the top 50 that year and never ran as fast again. He placed in the world top fifty for the last time in 2009, with a time of 49.77 seconds.

== International competitions ==
Year	Competition	Venue	Position	Event	Notes
2007	World Championships	Osaka, Japan	7th	400 m hurdles	52.97

== Personal records ==
- 110-meter hurdles – 13.96 (2003)
- 400-meter hurdles – 48.26 (2007)
- 200-meter dash – 21.24 (2009)
- 400-meter dash – 48.01 (2008)

Indoors

- 55-meter hurdles – 7.29 (2005)
- 60-meter hurdles – 7.85 (2005)
- 60-meter dash – 7.21 (2007)
- 400-meter dash – 47.55 (2007)
- All information from All-Athletics.
