= Athletics at the 2006 Asian Games – Men's 400 metres hurdles =

Men's 400 metres hurdles at the 2006 Asian Games
- Venue: Khalifa International Stadium
- Dates: 9–10 December 2006
- Competitors: 10 from 8 nations

Medalists
gold medal	Kenji Narisako	Japan
silver medal	Meng Yan	China
bronze medal	Naohiro Kawakita	Japan

The men's 400 metres hurdles competition at the 2006 Asian Games in Doha, Qatar was held on 9 and 10 December 2006 at the Khalifa International Stadium.

== Schedule ==
All times are Arabia Standard Time (UTC+03:00)

Date	Time	Event
Saturday, 9 December 2006	16:10	1st round
Sunday, 10 December 2006	17:30	Final

== Records ==
Prior to this competition, the existing world, Asian and Games records were as follows.

World Record	Kevin Young (USA)	46.78	Barcelona, Spain	6 August 1992
Asian Record	Hadi Soua'an Al-Somaily (KSA)	47.53	Sydney, Australia	27 September 2000
Games Record	Hadi Soua'an Al-Somaily (KSA)	48.42	Busan, South Korea	8 October 2002

== Results ==
Legend

- DNS — Did not start

=== 1st round ===
- Qualification: First 3 in each heat (Q) and the next 2 fastest (q) advance to the final.

==== Heat 1 ====
Rank	Athlete	Time	Notes
1	Kenji Narisako (JPN)	50.69	Q
2	Yevgeniy Meleshenko (KAZ)	51.27	Q
3	Bandar Sharahili (KSA)	52.10	Q
4	Aleksey Pogorelov (KGZ)	52.31	q
5	Ali Hazer (LIB)	55.55	

==== Heat 2 ====
Rank	Athlete	Time	Notes
1	Naohiro Kawakita (JPN)	50.44	Q
2	Meng Yan (CHN)	50.64	Q
3	Hadi Soua'an Al-Somaily (KSA)	50.87	Q
4	Mubarak Al-Nubi (QAT)	51.28	q
5	Allah Ditta (PAK)	53.16	

=== Final ===
Rank	Athlete	Time	Notes
1st place, gold medalist(s)	Kenji Narisako (JPN)	48.78	
2nd place, silver medalist(s)	Meng Yan (CHN)	49.26	
3rd place, bronze medalist(s)	Naohiro Kawakita (JPN)	50.19	
4	Yevgeniy Meleshenko (KAZ)	50.57	
5	Hadi Soua'an Al-Somaily (KSA)	50.69	
6	Aleksey Pogorelov (KGZ)	52.20	
7	Bandar Sharahili (KSA)	1:07.94	
—	Mubarak Al-Nubi (QAT)	DNS	
