= Naohiro Kawakita =

Japanese hurdler (born 1980)

Personal information
- Nationality: Japanese
- Born: 10 July 1980 (age 46) Takamatsu, Kagawa, Japan
- Education: University of Tsukuba
- Height: 1.81 m (5 ft 11 in)
- Weight: 75 kg (165 lb)

Sport
- Country: Japan
- Sport: Track and field
- Event: 400 metres hurdles

Achievements and titles
- Personal best: 49.04 (Niigata 2009)
Medal record
Men's athletics
Representing Japan
Asian Games
Bronze medal – third place	2006 Doha	400 m hurdles
Bronze medal – third place	2010 Guangzhou	400 m hurdles
East Asian Games
Gold medal – first place	2009 Hong Kong	400 m hurdles
Gold medal – first place	2009 Hong Kong	4×400 m relay
Asian Junior Championships
Gold medal – first place	1999 Singapore	400 m hurdles

Naohiro Kawakita (河北 尚広, Kawakita Naohiro; born 10 July 1980 in Takamatsu, Kagawa) is a Japanese hurdler who specialises in the 400 metres hurdles. He won bronze medals at the 2006 Asian Games and 2010 Asian Games in the event.

== Personal best ==
Event	Time (s)	Competition	Venue	Date
400 m hurdles	49.04	National Sports Festival	Niigata, Japan	3 October 2009

== International competition ==
Year	Competition	Venue	Position	Event	Time	Notes
Representing Japan
1999	Asian Junior Championships	Singapore	7th	400 m hurdles	54.64	
1999	Asian Junior Championships	Singapore	1st	4×400 m relay	3:07.38 (relay leg: 4th)	GR
2003	Summer Universiade	Daegu, South Korea	7th	400 m hurdles	50.03	
2003	Summer Universiade	Daegu, South Korea	4th	4×400 m relay	3:05.97 (relay leg: 4th)	
2005	Asian Championships	Incheon, South Korea	4th	400 m hurdles	50.10	
2006	Asian Games	Doha, Qatar	3rd	400 m hurdles	50.19	
2009	East Asian Games	Hong Kong, China	1st	400 m hurdles	50.61	
2009	East Asian Games	Hong Kong, China	1st	4×400 m relay	3:07.08 (relay leg: 3rd)	
2010	Asian Games	Guangzhou, China	3rd	400 m hurdles	50.37	
2010	Asian Games	Guangzhou, China	2nd (h)^{1}	4×400 m relay	3:06.53 (relay leg: 3rd)	

^{1}Did not compete in the final where Japan won the silver medal
