= Athletics at the 2001 Summer Universiade – Men's 400 metres hurdles =

The men's 400 metres hurdles event at the 2001 Summer Universiade was held at the Workers Stadium in Beijing, China on 30–31 August.

== Medalists ==
Gold	Silver	Bronze
Alwyn Myburgh; South Africa	Yevgeniy Meleshenko; Kazakhstan	Chen Tien-wen; Chinese Taipei

== Results ==
=== Heats ===
Held on 30 August

Rank	Heat	Athlete	Nationality	Time	Notes
1	1	Marek Plawgo	Poland	49.74	Q
2	1	Carlos Silva	Portugal	49.80	Q
3	1	Periklis Iakovakis	Greece	49.85	Q
4	4	Alwyn Myburgh	South Africa	49.89	Q
5	3	Marcel Schelbert	Switzerland	50.03	Q
6	3	Martin Willemse	South Africa	50.04	Q
7	1	Štěpán Tesařík	Czech Republic	50.08	Q
8	2	Yevgeniy Meleshenko	Kazakhstan	50.10	Q
9	2	Fred Sharpe	United States	50.11	Q
10	3	Marcel Lopuchovský	Slovakia	50.12	Q
11	4	Ken Yoshizawa	Japan	50.19	Q
12	2	Yoshihiro Chiba	Japan	50.28	Q
13	3	Aleksandr Derevyagin	Russia	50.28	Q
14	3	Chen Tien-wen	Chinese Taipei	50.31	q
15	2	Jan Schneider	Germany	50.55	Q
16	2	Matthew Douglas	Great Britain	50.59	
17	4	Bayano Kamani	United States	50.65	Q
18	3	Eduardo Iván Rodríguez	Spain	50.85	
19	4	Leonid Vershinin	Belarus	50.89	
20	1	Gianni Carabelli	Italy	50.95	
21	4	Anderson Costa dos Santos	Brazil	50.98	
22	4	Rova Rabemananjara	Canada	51.37	
23	4	Jaime Juan	Spain	51.67	
24	2	Tahar Ghozali	Algeria	51.68	
25	1	Charles Robertson-Adams	Great Britain	52.88	
26	1	Jeerachai Linglom	Thailand	53.58	
27	4	Kulan Arunajith	Sri Lanka	56.04	
28	3	Ravindra Jayasinghe	Sri Lanka	56.35	
29	2	A. Flores	Peru	58.77	
30	3	Rony Georges	Lebanon	59.46	

=== Semifinals ===
Held on 31 August

Rank	Heat	Athlete	Nationality	Time	Notes
1	1	Alwyn Myburgh	South Africa	49.04	Q
2	1	Carlos Silva	Portugal	49.22	Q
3	1	Periklis Iakovakis	Greece	49.30	Q
4	1	Yevgeniy Meleshenko	Kazakhstan	49.49	q
5	2	Chen Tien-wen	Chinese Taipei	49.57	Q
6	1	Ken Yoshizawa	Japan	49.63	q
7	2	Martin Willemse	South Africa	49.68	Q
8	2	Marek Plawgo	Poland	49.77	Q
9	1	Štěpán Tesařík	Czech Republic	49.87	
10	2	Yoshihiro Chiba	Japan	50.00	
11	2	Fred Sharpe	United States	50.01	
12	2	Marcel Schelbert	Switzerland	50.53	
13	2	Marcel Lopuchovský	Slovakia	50.55	
14	2	Aleksandr Derevyagin	Russia	50.60	
15	1	Bayano Kamani	United States	50.64	
16	1	Jan Schneider	Germany	51.44	

=== Final ===
Held on 31 August

Rank	Athlete	Nationality	Time	Notes
1st place, gold medalist(s)	Alwyn Myburgh	South Africa	48.09	UR
2nd place, silver medalist(s)	Yevgeniy Meleshenko	Kazakhstan	48.46	
3rd place, bronze medalist(s)	Chen Tien-wen	Chinese Taipei	48.63	
4	Periklis Iakovakis	Greece	48.87	
5	Martin Willemse	South Africa	48.96	
6	Carlos Silva	Portugal	49.07	
7	Ken Yoshizawa	Japan	49.60	
8	Marek Plawgo	Poland	49.68	
