= 2001 Asian Junior Athletics Championships =

9th Asian Junior Championships
- Dates: 19 – 22 July
- Host city: Bandar Seri Begawan, Brunei
- Level: Junior (under-20)
- Events: 43

The 2001 Asian Junior Athletics Championships was the ninth edition of the international athletics competition for Asian under-20 athletes, organised by the Asian Athletics Association. It took place from 19–22 July in Bandar Seri Begawan, Brunei. A total of 43 events were contested, which were divided equally between male and female athletes aside from the men's 3000 metres steeplechase.

== Medal summary ==
=== Men ===
Event	Gold		Silver		Bronze	
100 metres	Salem Al-Yami (KSA)	10.49	Liu Dapeng (CHN)	10.80	Yusuke Shimizu (JPN)	10.89
200 metres (Wind: +2.9 m/s)	Salem Al-Yami (KSA)	20.81 w	Tatsuro Yoshino (JPN)	21.11 w	Yusuke Omae (JPN)	21.22 w
400 metres	Hamed Al-Bishi (KSA)	46.16	Mohd Zaiful Zainal Abidin (MAS)	46.41 NR	Takeharu Nakahara (JPN)	46.88
800 metres	Salem Amer Al-Badri (QAT)	1:51.15	Adam Abdou (QAT)	1:51.36	Mohammad Al-Azemi (KUW)	1:52.46
1500 metres	Jamal Noor (QAT)	3:47.68	Abdulrahman Suleiman (QAT)	3:49.92	Atta Miran (PAK)	3:50.48
5000 metres	Abdulaziz Al-Ameri (QAT)	14:20.72 CR	Yukihiro Motoda (JPN)	14:33.94	Chiang Chieh-Wen (TPE)	14:47.72
10,000 metres	Hamed Mohamed (QAT)	30:56.38	Majid Aman Awadh (QAT)	30:59.21	Omid Mehrabi (IRI)	32:23.40
110 metres hurdles	Shi Dongpeng (CHN)	14.05 CR	Nassim Brahimi (QAT)	14.33	Yuji Ohashi (JPN)	14.37
400 metres hurdles	Hamed Al-Bishi (KSA)	50.94	Masahira Yoshikata (JPN)	51.32	Song Jung-Ho (KOR)	51.50
3000 metres steeplechase	Yoshiyuki Musha (JPN)	9:07.89	Ali Heidari (IRI)	9:15.65	Bahrin Arifin Jumat (BRU)	11:41.04
4 × 100 m relay	Thailand (THA)	40.11	Japan (JPN); Tomoko Motegi; Tatsuro Yoshino; Yusuke Shimizu; Yuji Ohashi	40.35	Malaysia (MAS)	41.06
4 × 400 m relay	Japan (JPN); Naoki Ihara; Takeharu Nakahara; Masahira Yoshikata; Tomohiro Ito	3:12.11	India (IND)	3:12.15	Sri Lanka (SRI)	3:18.17
10,000 metres walk	Zhu Hongjun (CHN)	43:16.67 CR	Takayuki Tanii (JPN)	43:47.23	Koji Takada (JPN)	44:10.73
High jump	Park Jun-Hwan (KOR)	2.15 m	Xu Hao (CHN)	2.12 m	Hiroaki Akai (JPN)	2.06 m
Pole vault	Sompong Saombankuay (THA)	4.90 m	Hsieh Lieng-Che (TPE)	4.60 m	Mohamed Al-Ghadban (KUW)	4.60 m
Long jump	Chao Chih-chien (TPE)	7.66 m	Cai Peng (CHN)	7.65 m	Hiroyuki Oishi (JPN)	7.61 m (w)
Triple jump	Wang Yinglei (CHN)	15.99 m	Kazuyoshi Ishikawa (JPN)	15.92 m	Park Hyun-Jin (KOR)	15.91 m (w)
Shot put	Amit Tyagi (IND)	17.66 m	Hui Zhenbao (CHN)	17.48 m	Chang Ming-huang (TPE)	17.20 m
Discus throw	Wu Tao (CHN)	60.14 m CR	Xu Yongyi (CHN)	56.26 m	Khalid Habash Al-Suwaidi (QAT)	55.28 m
Hammer throw	Dilshod Nazarov (TJK)	68.08 m CR	Mohamed Al-Dashti (KUW)	62.58 m	Rakesh Kumar Yadav (IND)	61.27 m
Javelin throw	Chen Qi (CHN)	77.22 m CR	Ahmed Abou Jalala (QAT)	70.37 m	Hamad Al-Khalifa (QAT)	69.41 m
Decathlon	Pavel Dubitskiy (KAZ)	7051 pts	Leonid Andreev (UZB)	6897 pts	Akira Oshima (JPN)	6721 pts

=== Women ===
Event	Gold		Silver		Bronze	
100 metres	Ni Xiaoli (CHN)	11.74	Mukti Saha (IND)	11.90	Lin Lengmei (CHN)	12.01
200 metres (Wind: +2.9 m/s)	Ni Xiaoli (CHN)	23.91 w	Rina Fujimaki (JPN)	24.27 w	Mukti Saha (IND)	24.28 w
400 metres	Zhai Lin (CHN)	53.91	Manjit Kaur (IND)	54.11	Zhou Wei (CHN)	54.79
800 metres	Yang Wei (CHN)	2:08.77	No Yoo-Yeon (KOR)	2:10.23	Oliva Sadi (INA)	2:11.77
1500 metres	Yang Wei (CHN)	4:28.36	No Yoo-Yeon (KOR)	4:31.28	Kaori Urata (JPN)	4:34.02
5000 metres	Zhang Yuhong (CHN)	16:17.80	Hiromi Koga (JPN)	16:18.57	Zhang Yang (CHN)	16:21.41
10,000 metres	Zhang Yuhong (CHN)	35:28.24	Zhang Yang (CHN)	35:31.91	Chen Shu-Hua (TPE)	38:33.79
100 metres hurdles	Yelena Nikitenko (KAZ)	13.91	Mukti Saha (IND)	14.12	Yukiko Taniguchi (JPN)	14.20
400 metres hurdles	Chiu Hsiao-Chuan (TPE)	62.81	Lau Lai Ha (HKG)	70.60	Only two finishers	
4 × 100 m relay	Japan (JPN); Yuka Hayashi; Rina Fujimaki; Kanui Takahashi; Ayumi Ushihara	46.11	China (CHN)	46.45	Thailand (THA)	47.00
4 × 400 m relay	China (CHN)	3:41.65	India (IND) ? ? Manjit Kaur; Pratima Gaonkar	3:42.34	Vietnam (VIE)	3:52.34
10,000 metres walk	Sachiko Konishi (JPN)	48:12.05	Guo Dongmei (CHN)	48:21.76	Mika Tanaka (JPN)	49:57.73
High jump	Marina Korzhova (KAZ)	1.85 m	Li Rong (CHN)	1.79 m	Noengrothai Chaipetch (THA)	1.73 m
Pole vault	Sun Yufei (CHN)	4.11 m CR	Roslinda Samsu (MAS)	3.70 m	Lin Ya-Luen (TPE)	3.70 m
Long jump	Zhou Yangxia (CHN)	6.21 m	Jeong Soon-Ok (KOR)	5.84 m	Lin Yueh-Chin (TPE)	5.58 m
Triple jump	Tatyana Bocharova (KAZ)	13.24 m	Zhou Yangxia (CHN)	13.23 m	Yang Ya-Wen (TPE)	12.55 m
Shot put	Zhang Xiaoyu (CHN)	18.04 m	Lin Chia-ying (TPE)	14.25 m	Yeh Nai-Ching (TPE)	11.69 m
Discus throw	Xu Shaoyang (CHN)	58.03 m	Seema Antil (IND)	53.04 m	Yeh Nai-Ching (TPE)	47.49 m
Hammer throw	Yang Meiping (CHN)	65.21 m CR	Rose Inggriana (INA)	45.39 m	Archana Bara (IND)	44.79 m
Javelin throw	Yi Chunmei (CHN)	56.43 m	Buoban Pamang (THA)	54.51 m	Hidemi Ueki (JPN)	48.69 m
Heptathlon	Anna Karpova (KAZ)	4992 pts	Hsieh Yi-Lun (TPE)	4455 pts	Kao Wan-Ling (TPE)	4282 pts

== 2001 Medal Table ==
Rank	Nation	Gold	Silver	Bronze	Total
1	China (CHN)	19	10	3	32
2	Kazakhstan (KAZ)	5	0	0	5
3	Japan (JPN)	4	8	12	24
4	Qatar (QAT)	4	5	2	11
5	Saudi Arabia (KSA)	4	0	0	4
6	Chinese Taipei (TPE)	2	3	9	14
7	Thailand (THA)	2	1	2	5
8	India (IND)	1	6	3	10
9	South Korea (KOR)	1	3	2	6
10	Tajikistan (TJK)	1	0	0	1
11	Malaysia (MAS)	0	2	1	3
12	Kuwait (KUW)	0	1	2	3
13	Indonesia (INA)	0	1	1	2
13	Iran (IRI)	0	1	1	2
15	Hong Kong (HKG)	0	1	0	1
15	Uzbekistan (UZB)	0	1	0	1
17	Brunei (BRU)	0	0	1	1
17	Pakistan (PAK)	0	0	1	1
17	Sri Lanka (SRI)	0	0	1	1
17	Vietnam (VIE)	0	0	1	1
Totals (20 entries)		43	43	42	128
