= Abdullah Sabt Ghulam =

Emirati hurdler

Personal information
- Nationality: Emirati
- Born: 2 January 1975 (age 51)

Sport
- Sport: Track and field
- Event: 400 metres hurdles
Medal record
Men's athletics
Representing the United Arab Emirates
Gulf Cooperation Council Championships
| Silver medal – second place | 1998 Muscat | 400 m hurdles |

Abdullah Kanbar Sabt Ghulam (Arabic: عبد الله قنبر سبت غلام; born 2 January 1975) is an Emirati hurdler. He competed in the men's 400 metres hurdles at the 1992 Summer Olympics.

== Career ==
At the 1992 Summer Olympics, Ghulam was seeded in the first heat of the 400 metres hurdles. He ran 56.20 seconds to place 7th, failing to advance.

Ghulam set his 400 m hurdles personal best at a July 1997 meeting in Beirut, Lebanon, running 51.22 seconds to win the event. Later that year at the Athens 1997 World Championships in Athletics, Ghulam placed 7th in his 400 m hurdles heat, running 51.51 seconds and not advancing.

Ghulam won his first international medal at the 1998 Gulf Cooperation Council Athletics Championships in Muscat, Oman. Entered in the 400 m hurdles, Ghulam ran 51.41 seconds for the silver medal behind Mubarak Al-Nubi.

Later that season, Ghulam entered the 400 m hurdles at the 1998 Asian Games. In his semi-final heat, he ran 50.92 seconds to set a new personal best and qualify for the finals. He ran the final in 51.51 seconds, originally crossing the line in 7th.

On 20 December 1998, it was announced that Ghulam had tested positive for ephedrine, a banned substance. He was later disqualified from the Asian Games for doping, nullifying both of his times.

At age 29, Ghulam won the 2004 Emirati Athletics Championships title in the 400 m hurdles in Dubai.
