= Athletics at the 1998 Asian Games – Men's 400 metres hurdles =

International sporting event

Men's 400 metres hurdles at the 1998 Asian Games
- Venue: Thammasat Stadium
- Dates: 15–17 December 1998
- Competitors: 11 from 8 nations

Medalists
gold medal	Hideaki Kawamura	Japan
silver medal	Yoshihiko Saito	Japan
bronze medal	Chen Tien-wen	Chinese Taipei

The men's 400 metres hurdles competition at the 1998 Asian Games in Bangkok, Thailand was held on 15–17 December at the Thammasat Stadium.

== Schedule ==
All times are Indochina Time (UTC+07:00)

Date	Time	Event
Tuesday, 15 December 1998	17:40	Heats
Thursday, 17 December 1998	15:40	Final

== Results ==
Legend

- DNF — Did not finish

=== Heats ===
- Qualification: First 3 in each heat (Q) and the next 2 fastest (q) advance to the final.

==== Heat 1 ====
Rank	Athlete	Time	Notes
1	Hideaki Kawamura (JPN)	49.92	Q
2	Chen Tien-wen (TPE)	50.15	Q
3	Mubarak Al-Nubi (QAT)	51.23	Q
4	Harijan Ratnayake (SRI)	51.41	q
5	Wirat Sarad (THA)	51.81	q
6	Hamid Reza Fardinpour (IRI)	51.94	

==== Heat 2 ====
Rank	Athlete	Time	Notes
1	Yoshihiko Saito (JPN)	50.36	Q
2	Abdullah Sabt Ghulam (UAE)	~~50.92~~	Q
3	Zahirudin Al-Najem (SYR)	51.21	Q
4	Jirachai Linglom (THA)	51.85	
5	Lin Chin-fu (TPE)	52.00	

=== Final ===
Rank	Athlete	Time	Notes
1st place, gold medalist(s)	Hideaki Kawamura (JPN)	49.59	
2nd place, silver medalist(s)	Yoshihiko Saito (JPN)	49.94	
3rd place, bronze medalist(s)	Chen Tien-wen (TPE)	50.46	
4	Wirat Sarad (THA)	50.85	
5	Harijan Ratnayake (SRI)	50.93	
6	Zahirudin Al-Najem (SYR)	51.04	
—	Mubarak Al-Nubi (QAT)	DNF	
DQ	Abdullah Sabt Ghulam (UAE)	~~51.51~~	

- Abdullah Sabt Ghulam of the United Arab Emirates originally finished 7th, but was later disqualified after he tested positive for Ephedrine.
