= Charles Robertson-Adams =

British hurdler

Personal information
- Nationality: British
- Born: 5 December 1977 (age 48) Liverpool, England

Sport
- Sport: Athletics
- Event: Hurdles
- Club: Telford AC

Charles Lyndon Robertson-Adams (born 5 December 1977) is a British former track and field athlete who represented both Scotland and Great Britain. His personal best time for the 400 metres hurdles was 50.24 seconds, which stood as the Scottish record until 2022.

== Biography ==
Born in Liverpool, England, his father was born in Ghana to a Scottish family and returned to Scotland at a young age.

Robertson-Adams was a promising junior and won the 400m hurdles at the English Schools' Athletics Championships for three years in a row between 1994 - 1996. He represented Great Britain at the 1996 World Junior Championships finishing in 4th place in his heat with a time of 52.91. He did not qualify for the semifinals.

He became the British champion in 1997 by winning the AAA title at the 1997 AAA Championships.

Robertson-Adams represented Great Britain at the 1999 European Athletics U23 Championships in the 400m hurdles finishing in 7th place in his heat with a time 52.95. He did not qualify for the final.

Robertson-Adams became the Scottish champion over 400m hurdles in both 2001 and 2002 and on 4 July 2001 he set the Scottish record in the 400m hurdles with a time of 50.24 seconds, recorded at Loughborough University. This record stood until 2 June 2022 when it was broken by Jack Lawrie.

His sole senior international appearance came at the 2001 Summer Universiade, where he competed in the heats.

Robertson-Adams qualified to represent Scotland in the 2002 Commonwealth Games and was nominated for selection by Scottish athletics. However, his selection was blocked by the Commonwealth Games committee as neither he, nor his parents, had been born in Scotland. Mike Russell MSP called for his exclusion to be reversed, however, this was not achieved and Robertson-Adams subsequently retired from athletics.

== International competitions ==
Year	Competition	Venue	Position	Event	Notes
Representing Great Britain
1995	European Junior Championships	Nyíregyháza, Hungary	9th (h)	400 m hurdles	52.84
1996	World Junior Championships	Sydney, Australia	24th (h)	400m hurdles	52.91
1999	European U23 Championships	Gothenburg, Sweden	19th (h)	400m hurdles	52.95
2001	Summer Universiade	Beijing, China	25th (h)	400 m hurdles	52.88
