= Chen Tien-wen =

Taiwanese athlete (born 1978)

Personal information
- Born: 1 June 1978 (age 48)

Sport
- Sport: Track and field
Medal record
Representing Chinese Taipei
Asian Games
| Bronze medal – third place | 1998 Bangkok | 400 m hurdles |
Summer Universiade
| Bronze medal – third place | 2001 Beijing | 400 m hurdles |
Asian Championships
| Bronze medal – third place | 2003 Manila | 400 m hurdles |

Chen Tien-wen (Chinese: 陳天文; born 1 June 1978) is a retired Taiwanese athlete who competed mostly in the 200 metres and 400 metres hurdles. He is the national record holder in both events. He competed at three consecutive World Championships starting in 1999, as well as the 2000 Summer Olympics. He was the gold medallist at the 2001 East Asian Games and has won bronze medals at the Asian Games, Summer Universiade and the Asian Athletics Championships.

== Competition record ==
| Year | Competition | Venue | Position | Event | Notes |
Representing Chinese Taipei
| 1996 | World Junior Championships | Sydney, Australia | 25th (h) | 400 m hurdles | 52.92 |
| 1996 | Asian Junior Championships | New Delhi, India | 2nd | 400 m hurdles | 51.23 |
| 1997 | Asian Junior Championships | Bangkok, Thailand | 3rd | 4 × 400 m relay | 3:08.66 |
| 1998 | Asian Games | Bangkok, Thailand | 3rd | 400 m hurdles | 50.46 |
| 1998 | Asian Games | Bangkok, Thailand | 7th | 4 × 400 m relay | 3:07.61 |
| 1999 | World Indoor Championships | Maebashi, Japan | 27th (h) | 200 m | 21.82 |
| 1999 | Universiade | Palma de Mallorca, Spain | 29th (h) | 400 m hurdles | 52.45 |
| 1999 | World Championships | Seville, Spain | – | 400 m hurdles | DQ |
| 2000 | Asian Championships | Jakarta, Indonesia | 10th (h) | 400 m hurdles | 53.15 |
| 2000 | Olympic Games | Sydney, Australia | 23rd (sf) | 400 m hurdles | 50.52 |
| 2001 | World Indoor Championships | Lisbon, Portugal | 17th (h) | 200 m | 21.88 |
| 2001 | East Asian Games | Osaka, Japan | 1st | 400 m hurdles | 49.18 |
| 2001 | World Championships | Edmonton, Canada | – | 400 m hurdles | DQ |
| 2001 | Universiade | Beijing, China | 3rd | 400 m hurdles | 48.63 |
| 2002 | Asian Championships | Colombo, Sri Lanka | 16th (sf) | 100 m | 11.75 |
| 2002 | Asian Championships | Colombo, Sri Lanka | 8th (h) | 400 m hurdles | 53.02 |
| 2003 | World Championships | Paris, France | 34th (h) | 400 m hurdles | 51.42 |
| 2003 | Asian Championships | Manila, Philippines | 3rd | 400 m hurdles | 50.72 |
| 2005 | Asian Championships | Incheon, South Korea | – | 400 m hurdles | DNF |
| 2005 | Asian Championships | Incheon, South Korea | 6th | 4 × 100 m relay | 40.25 |

== Personal bests ==
Outdoor

- 400 metres – 46.74 (Tainan 1998)
- 400 metres hurdles – 48.63 (Beijing 2001) NR

Indoor

- 200 metres – 21.82 (Maebashi 1999) NR
