= 2003 Asian Athletics Championships – Men's 400 metres hurdles =

The men's 400 metres hurdles event at the 2003 Asian Athletics Championships was held in Manila, Philippines on September 21–23.

== Medalists ==
Gold	Silver	Bronze
Mubarak Al-Nubi; Qatar	Yevgeniy Meleshenko; Kazakhstan	Chen Tien-Wen; Chinese Taipei

== Results ==
=== Heats ===
Rank	Heat	Name	Nationality	Time	Notes
1	1	Mubarak Al-Nubi	Qatar	50.62	Q
2	1	Chen Tien-Wen	Chinese Taipei	51.24	Q
3	1	Tan Chunhua	China	51.26	Q
4	1	Apisit Kuttiyawan	Thailand	51.34	q
5	1	Yosuke Tsushima	Japan	51.57	q
6	2	Yevgeniy Meleshenko	Kazakhstan	51.79	Q
7	2	Harijan Ratnayake	Sri Lanka	52.43	Q
8	2	Yoshihiro Chiba	Japan	52.44	Q
9	1	Tang Hon Sing	Hong Kong	52.94	
10	2	Basil Al-Fadhli	Kuwait	53.22	
11	2	Domingo Manata	Philippines	54.71	PB
12	2	Ibrahim Al-Hamaidi	Saudi Arabia	1:20.67	

=== Final ===
Rank	Name	Nationality	Time	Notes
1st place, gold medalist(s)	Mubarak Al-Nubi	Qatar	49.19	
2nd place, silver medalist(s)	Yevgeniy Meleshenko	Kazakhstan	49.55	
3rd place, bronze medalist(s)	Chen Tien-Wen	Chinese Taipei	50.72	
4	Apisit Kuttiyawan	Thailand	50.86	SB
5	Tan Chunhua	China	51.19	
6	Yosuke Tsushima	Japan	51.79	
7	Harijan Ratnayake	Sri Lanka	52.91	
8	Yoshihiro Chiba	Japan	53.22	
