= Harijan Ratnayake =

Sri Lankan hurdler

Medal record

Men's athletics

Representing Sri Lanka

Asian Championships
Silver medal – second place	2000 Jakarta	400 m hurdles

Harijan Raja Ratnayake (born 8 December 1974) is a retired Sri Lankan athlete who specialised in the 400 metres hurdles. He represented his country at the 2000 Summer Olympics and the 2001 World Championships without qualifying for the semifinals.

His personal best of 49.44, set in 2000, is the current national record.

== Competition record ==
Year	Competition	Venue	Position	Event	Notes
Representing Sri Lanka
1998	Asian Games	Bangkok, Thailand	5th	400 m hurdles	50.93
2000	Asian Championships	Jakarta, Indonesia	2nd	400 m hurdles	49.44
2000	Olympic Games	Sydney, Australia	29th (h)	400 m hurdles	50.43
2001	World Championships	Edmonton, Canada	35th (h)	400 m hurdles	51.28
2002	Asian Championships	Colombo, Sri Lanka	7th (h)	400 m hurdles	52.09
2003	Asian Championships	Manila, Philippines	7th	400 m hurdles	52.91
2005	Asian Championships	Incheon, South Korea	12th (h)	400 m hurdles	55.94
