= Marcel Schelbert =

Swiss hurdler

Personal information
- Born: 26 February 1976 (age 50) Zurich, Switzerland
- Height: 1.93 m (6 ft 4 in)
- Weight: 83 kg (183 lb)

Sport
- Sport: Track and field
- Event: 400 metres hurdles
- Club: LC Zürich
Medal record
Men's athletics
Representing Switzerland
World Championships
Bronze medal – third place	1999 Sevilla	400 m hurdles
Summer Universiade
Bronze medal – third place	1999 Palma de Mallorca	400 m hurdles

Marcel Schelbert (born 26 February 1976) is a retired Swiss athlete who specialized in the 400 metres hurdles.

His personal best time of 48.13 seconds, achieved when he won the bronze medal at the 1999 World Championships, is also a Swiss record. He also won a bronze medal at the 1999 Summer Universiade. For these feats he was given the Swiss Sportsman of the Year Award the same year.

Schelbert retired in 2003, and now works in a bank.

== Achievements ==
Year	Competition	Venue	Position	Event	Notes
Representing Switzerland
1994	World Junior Championships	Lisbon, Portugal	9th (sf)	400 m hurdles	51.82
1995	European Junior Championships	Nyíregyháza, Hungary	2nd	400 m hurdles	50.44
1996	Olympic Games	Atlanta, United States	46th (h)	400 m hurdles	51.20
1997	European U23 Championships	Turku, Finland	2nd	400 m hurdles	49.43
1997	World Championships	Athens, Greece	14th (h)	4 × 400 m relay	3:05.34
1997	Universiade	Catania, Italy	7th	400 m hurdles	51.62
1997	Universiade	Catania, Italy	13th (h)	4 × 100 m relay	40.75
1997	Universiade	Catania, Italy	11th (h)	4 × 400 m relay	3:10.91
1999	Universiade	Palma de Mallorca, Spain	3rd	400 m hurdles	48.77
1999	World Championships	Seville, Spain	3rd	400 m hurdles	48.13
2001	Universiade	Beijing, China	1st (h)	400 m hurdles	50.03

Awards
Preceded by (Switzerland) Oscar Camenzind	Swiss Sportsman of the Year; 1999	Succeeded by (Switzerland) André Bucher
