= Masahira Yoshikata =

Japanese hurdler

Personal information
- Nationality: Japanese
- Born: 23 August 1982 (age 43) Fukuoka Prefecture, Japan
- Education: Fukuoka University
- Height: 1.76 m (5 ft 9 in)
- Weight: 70 kg (150 lb)

Sport
- Country: Japan
- Sport: Track and field
- Event: 400 metres hurdles

Achievements and titles
- Personal best: 48.66 (Yokohama 2005)
Medal record
Men's athletics
Representing Japan
Asian Junior Championships
Gold medal – first place	2001 Bandar Seri Begawan	4×400 m relay
Silver medal – second place	2001 Bandar Seri Begawan	400 m hurdles

Masahira Yoshikata (吉形 政衡, Yoshikata Masahira; born 23 August 1982 in Fukuoka Prefecture) is a Japanese hurdler who specialises in the 400 metres hurdles. He competed at the 2007 World Championships.

== Personal best ==
Event	Time (s)	Competition	Venue	Date
400 m hurdles	48.66	Super Meet	Yokohama, Japan	19 September 2005

== International competition ==
Year	Competition	Venue	Position	Event	Time
Representing Japan
2001	Asian Junior Championships	Bandar Seri Begawan, Brunei	2nd	400 m hurdles	51.32
2001	Asian Junior Championships	Bandar Seri Begawan, Brunei	1st	4×400 m relay	3:12.11 (relay leg: 3rd)
2003	Universiade	Daegu, South Korea	7th (sf)	400 m hurdles	49.80
2007	Asian Championships	Amman, Jordan	4th	400 m hurdles	50.94
2007	World Championships	Osaka, Japan	29th (h)	400 m hurdles	50.59
