= Yevgeniy Meleshenko =

Kazakhstani hurdler (born 1981)

Personal information
- Born: 19 January 1981 (age 45) Kokshetau, Soviet Union

Sport
- Sport: Track and field
Medal record
Representing Kazakhstan
Summer Universiade
Silver medal – second place	2001 Beijing	400 m hurdles
Asian Championships
Gold medal – first place	2007 Amman	400 m hurdles
Silver medal – second place	2003 Manila	400 m hurdles
Silver medal – second place	2005 Incheon	400 m hurdles
Bronze medal – third place	2002 Colombo	400 m hurdles
Asian Indoor Championships
Bronze medal – third place	2006 Pattaya	400 m

Yevgeniy Meleshenko (born 19 January 1981) is a Kazakhstani hurdler.

== Career ==
He finished fifth at the 2002 World Junior Championships, won the silver medal at the 2001 Summer Universiade and finished ninth at the 2006 World Cup. He also finished seventh in the 4x400 metres relay at the 2005 Summer Universiade.

On the regional level he won the bronze medal at the 2002 Asian Championships, the silver medals at the 2003 and 2005 Asian Championships and the gold medal at the 2007 Asian Championships. He finished fourth at the 2006 Asian Games. He also won a gold in the Athletics at the 2003 Afro-Asian Games.

He also competed at the World Championships in 2003, 2005 and 2007 as well as the Olympic Games in 2004 and the 2008 without reaching the final.

His personal best time is 48.46 seconds, achieved at the 2001 Summer Universiade in Beijing.

== Competition record ==
Year	Competition	Venue	Position	Event	Notes
Representing Kazakhstan
2000	World Junior Championships	Santiago, Chile	5th	400 m hurdles	51.05
2001	Universiade	Beijing, China	2nd	400 m hurdles	48.46
2002	Asian Championships	Colombo, Sri Lanka	3rd	400 m hurdles	49.56
2002	Asian Games	Busan, South Korea	4th	400 m hurdles	49.84
2003	World Championships	Helsinki, Finland	13th (sf)	400 m hurdles	48.84
2003	Asian Championships	Manila, Philippines	2nd	400 m hurdles	49.55
2003	Afro-Asian Games	Hyderabad, India	1st	400 m hurdles	49.66
2004	Olympic Games	Beijing, China	20th (sf)	400 m hurdles	49.48
2005	World Championships	Helsinki, Finland	14th (sf)	400 m hurdles	49.22
2005	Universiade	İzmir, Turkey	1st (h)	400 m hurdles	50.30
2005	Universiade	İzmir, Turkey	7th	4 × 400 m relay	3:09.92
2005	Asian Championships	Incheon, South Korea	2nd	400 m hurdles	49.18
2005	Asian Championships	Incheon, South Korea	6th	4 × 400 m relay	3:10.73
2005	Asian Indoor Games	Bangkok, Thailand	2nd	400 m	47.84
2006	Asian Indoor Championships	Pattaya, Thailand	3rd	400 m	48.65
2006	Asian Games	Doha, Qatar	4th	400 m hurdles	50.57
2007	Asian Championships	Amman, Jordan	1st	400 m hurdles	50.01
2007	Asian Championships	Amman, Jordan	6th	4 × 400 m relay	3:13.80
2007	Universiade	Bangkok, Thailand	5th	400 m hurdles	49.86
2007	World Championships	Osaka, Japan	18th (sf)	400 m hurdles	49.56
2008	Olympic Games	Beijing, China	– (h)	400 m hurdles	DNF
2009	Asian Championships	Guangzhou, China	5th	400 m hurdles	51.47
2010	Asian Games	Guangzhou, China	4th	400 m hurdles	51.34
