= Yuji Ohashi =

Japanese hurdler

Personal information
- Nationality: Japanese
- Born: 5 September 1983 (age 42) Hokkaido, Japan
- Education: University of Tsukuba
- Height: 1.85 m (6 ft 1 in)
- Weight: 73 kg (161 lb)

Sport
- Country: Japan
- Sport: Track and field
- Event(s): 60 metres hurdles 110 metres hurdles

Achievements and titles
- Personal best(s): 60 m hurdles: 8.01 (2008); 110 m hurdles: 13.55 (2007)
Medal record
Men's athletics
Representing Japan
Asian Junior Championships
Silver medal – second place	2001 Bandar Seri Begawan	4×100 m relay
Bronze medal – third place	2001 Bandar Seri Begawan	110 m hurdles

Yuji Ohashi (大橋 祐二, Ōhashi Yūji; born 5 September 1983 in Hokkaido) is a Japanese hurdler. He was the former Japanese national high school record holder in the 110 metres hurdles and the first Japanese high school student to run under 14 seconds. He competed in the 60 metres hurdles at the 2008 World Indoor Championships. He played soccer before switching to athletics.

He is currently the sprint coach of the track and field club at Japan Women's College of Physical Education.

== Personal bests ==
Event	Time (s)	Competition	Venue	Date	Notes
60 m hurdles	8.01 (indoor)	World Indoor Championships	Valencia, Spain	3 March 2008	
110 m hurdles	13.55 (wind: +2.0 m/s)	Chuhei Nambu Memorial	Sapporo, Japan	14 July 2007	
110 m hurdles	13.44 (wind: +3.3 m/s)	East Japan Corporate Championships	Kumagaya, Japan	17 May 2008	Wind-assisted

== International competitions ==
Year	Competition	Venue	Position	Event	Time (s)
Representing Japan
1999	World Youth Championships	Bydgoszcz, Poland	31st (h)	110 m hurdles (91.4 cm)	14.94 (wind: +0.2 m/s)
2001	Asian Junior Championships	Bandar Seri Begawan, Brunei	3rd	110 m hurdles	14.37 (wind: +0.2 m/s)
2001	Asian Junior Championships	Bandar Seri Begawan, Brunei	2nd	4×100 m relay	40.35 (relay leg: 4th)
2002	World Junior Championships	Kingston, Jamaica	19th (h)	110 m hurdles	14.85 (wind: -3.5 m/s)
2002	Asian Junior Championships	Bangkok, Thailand	4th	110 m hurdles	14.63 (wind: -0.5 m/s)
2005	East Asian Games	Macau, China	5th	110 m hurdles	14.00 (wind: -0.9 m/s)
2008	World Indoor Championships	Valencia, Spain	30th (h)	60 m hurdles	8.01 PB

== National titles ==
- 110 m hurdles
  - National Sports Festival - 2001 (Boys A), 2005
  - National Corporate Championships - 2008
  - National University Championships - 2003
  - National University Individual Championships - 2005
  - National Junior Championships - 2002
  - National High School Championships - 2001
