= Yoshihiro Chiba =

Japanese hurdler

Personal information
- Nationality: Japanese
- Born: 29 April 1979 (age 47) Saitama Prefecture, Japan
- Education: Juntendo University
- Height: 1.78 m (5 ft 10 in)
- Weight: 65 kg (143 lb)

Sport
- Country: Japan
- Sport: Track and field
- Event: 400 metres hurdles
- Retired: 2008

Achievements and titles
- Personal bests: 300 m hurdles: 35.54 AB (2003); 400 m hurdles: 48.65 (2001)
Medal record
Men's athletics
Representing Japan
Asian Championships
Bronze medal – third place	2002 Colombo	4×400 m relay

Yoshihiro Chiba (千葉 佳裕, Chiba Yoshiro; born 29 April 1979 in Saitama Prefecture) is a retired Japanese hurdler who specialized in the 400 metres hurdles. He is the Asian best performer in the rarely-contested 300 metres hurdles.

He is currently the director of track and field club at Josai University. He married Japanese hurdler Satomi Kubokura in April 2013.

== Personal bests ==
Event	Time (s)	Competition	Venue	Date	Notes
300 m hurdles	35.54	Shiroyama Athletics Stadium Opening Memorial	Nanao, Japan	27 July 2003	Current AB
400 m hurdles	48.65	Kanto Region University Championships	Yokohama, Japan	15 May 2001	

== International competitions ==
Year	Competition	Venue	Position	Event	Time
Representing Japan
2000	Asian Championships	Jakarta, Indonesia	5th	400 m hurdles	50.96
2001	Universiade	Beijing, China	10th (sf)	400 m hurdles	50.00
2002	Asian Championships	Colombo, Sri Lanka	4th	400 m hurdles	50.24
2002	Asian Championships	Colombo, Sri Lanka	3rd	4×400 m relay	3:07.09 (relay leg: 3rd)
2003	Asian Championships	Manila, Philippines	8th	400 m hurdles	53.22
