= 2005 Asian Athletics Championships – Men's 400 metres hurdles =

The men's 400 metres hurdles event at the 2005 Asian Athletics Championships was held in Incheon, South Korea on September 2–4.

== Medalists ==
Gold	Silver	Bronze
Hadi Soua'an Al-Somaily; Saudi Arabia	Yevgeniy Meleshenko; Kazakhstan	Zhang Shibao; China

== Results ==
=== Heats ===
Rank	Heat	Name	Nationality	Time	Notes
1	1	Hadi Soua'an Al-Somaily	Saudi Arabia	50.21	Q
2	1	Yevgeniy Meleshenko	Kazakhstan	50.41	Q
3	1	Zhang Shibao	China	50.52	Q
4	1	Ken Yoshizawa	Japan	51.48	q
4	2	Naohiro Kawakita	Japan	51.48	Q
6	1	Patlavath Shankar	India	52.09	q
7	2	Bandar Sharahili	Saudi Arabia	53.03	Q
8	1	Julius Nierras	Philippines	53.86	
9	2	Aleksey Pogorelov	Kyrgyzstan	53.93	Q
10	1	Mohd Zuslaini Zafril	Malaysia	54.00	
11	2	Lee Dong-Jae	South Korea	54.38	
12	2	Harijan Ratnayake	Sri Lanka	55.94	
	2	Chen Tien-Wen	Chinese Taipei	DNF	

=== Final ===
Rank	Name	Nationality	Time	Notes
1st place, gold medalist(s)	Hadi Soua'an Al-Somaily	Saudi Arabia	49.16	
2nd place, silver medalist(s)	Yevgeniy Meleshenko	Kazakhstan	49.18	SB
3rd place, bronze medalist(s)	Zhang Shibao	China	49.65	PB
4	Naohiro Kawakita	Japan	50.10	
5	Ken Yoshizawa	Japan	50.73	
6	Bandar Sharahili	Saudi Arabia	52.13	
	Patlavath Shankar	India	DQ	
	Aleksey Pogorelov	Kyrgyzstan	DNS	
