= Anna Raynor =

American javelin thrower (born 1985)

Personal information
- Born: March 1, 1985 (age 41)
- Home town: Benson, North Carolina
- Education: South Johnston High School; University of North Carolina Wilmington

Sport
- Country: United States
- Sport: Sport of athletics
- Events: Javelin throw High jump 100 metres hurdles
- College team: UNC Wilmington Seahawks

Achievements and titles
- National finals: 2006 NCAAs; • Javelin throw, 4th; 2007 NCAAs; • Javelin throw, 4th; 2007 USA Champs; • Javelin throw, 3rd (bronze); 2009 USA Champs; • Javelin throw, 12th
- Personal bests: JT: 54.61m (2008); HJ: 1.80m (2005); 100mH: 14.06 (2005)
Medal record
Women's athletics
Representing the United States
NACAC Championships
Silver medal – second place	2007 San Salvador	Javelin throw
- Updated on July 2024

Anna Raynor Marbry (born March 1, 1985) is an American former javelin thrower, high jumper, and hurdler. She won the silver medal in the javelin at the 2007 NACAC Championships in Athletics, and she finished 3rd at the 2007 USA Outdoor Track and Field Championships.

== Career ==
Raynor attended South Johnston High School where she competed in volleyball, basketball, softball, and track. As a prep, she won NCHSAA 4A state titles in the long jump (2002) and high jump (2003).

Competing for the UNC Wilmington Seahawks track and field team, Raynor qualified for the 2004 NCAA East regionals in the high jump but did not make it to the 2004 NCAA Division I Outdoor Track and Field Championships. She did qualify for the 2005 NCAA Division I Indoor Track and Field Championships as a high jumper, finishing 16th with a 1.72 m best.

She was introduced to the javelin through the heptathlon, and starting excelling at the javelin individually in the spring of 2005. She placed 11th in the finals of the 2005 NCAA Division I Outdoor Track and Field Championships with a 42.78 m throw, becoming the first ever All-American in any sport from her school. At the following edition of the NCAA championships, she improved her mark to 53.48 m and her placing to 4th.

After placing 4th again at her final NCAA Outdoor Championships in 2007, Raynor went on to compete at the 2007 USA Outdoor Track and Field Championships. She placed 3rd there which would have qualified her to be selected to represent the U.S. at the 2007 World Championships in Athletics, but her best mark of 53.77 m did not meet the qualifying standard.

She nonetheless represented the U.S. at the 2007 NACAC Championships in Athletics, where she won the silver medal in the javelin behind Ana Gutiérrez of Mexico. According to a test performed in 2008, Raynor had the theoretical ability to throw 206–210 feet (63–64 m), just under the then-American record of 210 ft 7 in (64.18 m). Raynor was noted to be 20-50 pounds lighter than most of her competitors. At the 2008 United States Olympic trials, Raynor only managed a 47.95 m throw and placed 6th in her qualifying round.

After placing 12th overall in qualification at the 2009 USA Outdoor Track and Field Championships, Raynor retired from professional competition due to injuries in her shoulders and elbows. She could have attempted a surgical solution, but she would have had to pay the medical bills herself and did not think the cost was worth it given her meager pay.

However, she did return to throw 45.34 m at an alumni competition in 2015.

== Personal life ==
Raynor is from Benson, North Carolina. After retirement in 2009, Raynor began to teach special education at her alma mater South Johnston High School. She also owns a drafting business.

Raynor married Michael Marbry, an aspiring professional baseball player, in 2010.

== Statistics ==
=== Personal best progression ===
Javelin Throw progression
#	Mark	Pl.	Competition	Venue	Date	Ref.
1	44.29 m	H	ECAC	New Haven, CT	May 13, 2004	
2	46.95 m	2nd place, silver medalist(s)	ECAC	New Haven, CT	May 14, 2004	
3	48.45 m	1st place, gold medalist(s)	Charl Inv	Charlotte, NC	April 1, 2005	
4	48.98 m	3rd place, bronze medalist(s)	NCAA Division I East Regional Championships	New York, NY	May 27, 2005	
5	50.96 m	(bronze) (Qualification)	National Collegiate Athletic Association Championships	Sacramento, CA	June 7, 2005	
6	52.09 m	1st place, gold medalist(s)	Seahawk	Wilmington, NC	March 17, 2006	
7	52.70 m	1st place, gold medalist(s)	Penn Relays	Philadelphia, PA	April 26, 2006	
8	54.61 m	1st place, gold medalist(s)	Eastern Collegiate Athletic Conference Championships	Princeton, NJ	May 12, 2006	
