= Joseph Abraham =

Indian hurdler

Personal information
- Full name: Joseph Ganapathiplackal Abraham
- Nationality: Indian
- Born: 11 September 1981 (age 45) Kottayam, Kerala, India

Sport
- Country: India
- Sport: Running
- Events: 400 metre hurdles, 400 metres
- Club: Indian Railways
- Retired: yes
Medal record
Men's athletics
Representing India
Asian Games
Gold medal – first place	2010 Guangzhou	400 m hurdles
Silver medal – second place	2006 Doha	4×400 m
Asian Championships
Silver medal – second place	2009 Guangzhou	400 m hurdles
Bronze medal – third place	2007 Amman	400 m hurdles
Bronze medal – third place	2007 Amman	4×400 m

Joseph Abraham (born 11 September 1981) is an Indian track and field athlete from Kerala. He holds the current 400 metre hurdles State record of 49.51 seconds set during the 2007 World Championships in Athletics in Osaka on 26 August 2007. At Osaka, Abraham became the first Indian male athlete to clear the opening round of an event in the World Athletics Championships when he reached the 400m hurdles semifinals. He also won the 400m hurdles gold medal at 2010 Guangzhou Asian Games.

== Athletic career ==
Born in Kottayam district of Kerala, Abraham made a steady progress in intermediate hurdles. His first sub-52 came in 2003 and in the following year he clocked a time of 51.98 seconds. His best time in 2005 was 50.87 seconds. His first national record came at the 2006 National inter-State athletics championship in Chennai. He broke the national record of 50.39 seconds held by Patlavath Shankar with a time of 50.22 seconds. On 12 May 2007 at the 13th Federation Cup Athletics Championship in Kolkata, he broke his own 400m hurdles record 50.04 seconds to win the gold. Joseph's first sub-50 performance came in the Guwahati Asian Grand Prix circuit athletics in June 2007. He won the silver by setting the new national record of 49.52 seconds while coming second behind Chinese Meng Yan.

In June 2009, Abraham achieved the qualifying norm of 49.80 seconds for the Berlin World Championships, at the Indian Grand Prix meet in Chennai by clocking 49.59 seconds. Later in the same year, he won a silver medal in 400m hurdles (with a time of 49.96 seconds) at the 2009 Asian Championships in Athletics held at Guangzhou, China.

On 25 November 2010, Abraham became the first Indian to win individual gold medal at 400m hurdles at any Asian Games. He won the gold medal at 2010 Guangzhou Asian Games clocking a time of 49.96 seconds.

400m sprint

Abraham also competes in the 400m sprint. His personal best for the 400 metres is 46.70 seconds set at the 2006 Open National Athletics Championships in New Delhi.
