= 1999 European Athletics U23 Championships – Men's 400 metres hurdles =

The men's 400 metres hurdles event at the 1999 European Athletics U23 Championships was held in Gothenburg, Sweden, at Ullevi on 29 and 30 July 1999.

== Medalists ==
Gold	Thomas Goller; Germany
Silver	Boris Gorban; Russia
Bronze	Periklis Iakovakis; Greece

== Results ==
=== Final ===
30 July

Rank	Name	Nationality	Time	Notes
1st place, gold medalist(s)	Thomas Goller	Germany	49.67	
2nd place, silver medalist(s)	Boris Gorban	Russia	49.94	
3rd place, bronze medalist(s)	Periklis Iakovakis	Greece	49.97	
4	Lambros Zervakos	Greece	50.48	
5	Tomasz Rudnik	Poland	50.63	
6	Eduardo Iván Rodríguez	Spain	50.67	
7	Brian Liddy	Ireland	50.76	
8	Matthew Elias	United Kingdom	52.39	

=== Heats ===
29 July
Qualified: first 2 in each heat and 2 best to the Final

==== Heat 1 ====
Rank	Name	Nationality	Time	Notes
1	Matthew Elias	United Kingdom	50.84	Q
2	Periklis Iakovakis	Greece	50.93	Q
3	Tomasz Rudnik	Poland	51.02	q
4	Francesco Filisetti	Italy	51.09	
5	Jaime Juan	Spain	51.60	
6	David Keogan	Ireland	51.86	
7	Cédric El-Idrissi	Switzerland	53.12	
8	Iztok Hodnik	Slovenia	53.83	

==== Heat 2 ====
Rank	Name	Nationality	Time	Notes
1	Boris Gorban	Russia	50.57	Q
2	Lambros Zervakos	Greece	50.93	Q
3	Brian Liddy	Ireland	50.99	q
4	Guilhem Barthes	France	51.31	
5	Boris Vazovan	Slovakia	52.10	
6	Kimmo Haapasalo	Finland	52.23	
7	Charles Robertson-Adams	United Kingdom	52.95	
8	Filip Faems	Belgium	62.16	

==== Heat 3 ====
Rank	Name	Nationality	Time	Notes
1	Eduardo Iván Rodríguez	Spain	50.92	Q
2	Thomas Goller	Germany	51.01	Q
3	Leonid Vershinin	Belarus	51.15	
4	Daniel Gómez	Andorra	51.77	
5	Josef Rous	Czech Republic	52.51	
6	James Hillier	United Kingdom	52.79	
7	Panagiotis Raptis	Cyprus	53.17	
	Naman Keïta	France	DQ	

== Participation ==
According to an unofficial count, 24 athletes from 18 countries participated in the event.

- Andorra (1)
- Belarus (1)
- Belgium (1)
- Cyprus (1)
- Czech Republic (1)
- Finland (1)
- France (2)
- Germany (1)
- Greece (2)
- Ireland (2)
- Italy (1)
- Poland (1)
- Russia (1)
- Slovakia (1)
- Slovenia (1)
- Spain (2)
- Switzerland (1)
- United Kingdom (3)
