= 1997 European Athletics U23 Championships – Men's 400 metres hurdles =

The men's 400 metres hurdles event at the 1997 European Athletics U23 Championships was held in Turku, Finland, on 11 and 12 July 1997.

== Medalists ==
Gold	Lukáš Souček; Czech Republic
Silver	Marcel Schelbert; Switzerland
Bronze	Xavier Ravenet; France

== Results ==
=== Final ===
12 July

Rank	Name	Nationality	Time	Notes
1st place, gold medalist(s)	Lukáš Souček	Czech Republic	49.08	
2nd place, silver medalist(s)	Marcel Schelbert	Switzerland	49.43	
3rd place, bronze medalist(s)	Xavier Ravenet	France	49.63	
4	Jiří Mužík	Czech Republic	50.18	
5	Thomas Goller	Germany	50.37	
6	Bartosz Gruman	Poland	50.55	
7	Marians Zigmunds	Latvia	51.13	
8	Aleksandr Belyayev	Russia	51.68	

=== Heats ===
11 July
Qualified: first 2 in each heat and 2 best to the Final

==== Heat 1 ====
Rank	Name	Nationality	Time	Notes
1	Marcel Schelbert	Switzerland	49.64	Q
2	Xavier Ravenet	France	50.61	Q
3	Bartosz Gruman	Poland	50.80	q
4	Matthew Douglas	Great Britain	52.14	
5	Panagiótis Mandelidis	Greece	52.46	
6	Francesco Filisetti	Italy	52.64	

==== Heat 2 ====
Rank	Name	Nationality	Time	Notes
1	Jiří Mužík	Czech Republic	51.21	Q
2	Thomas Goller	Germany	51.59	Q
3	Aleksandr Belyayev	Russia	51.86	q
4	Juan Herrero	Spain	51.99	
5	Filip Faems	Belgium	52.01	
6	Leonid Vershinin	Belarus	52.47	
7	Brian Liddy	Ireland	52.77	

==== Heat 3 ====
Rank	Name	Nationality	Time	Notes
1	Lukáš Souček	Czech Republic	50.61	Q
2	Marians Zigmunds	Latvia	51.74	Q
3	Marcel Lopuchovský	Slovakia	51.97	
4	Sebastian Aryee	Germany	52.16	
5	Karol Radke	Poland	52.42	
6	Bilal Cantürk	Turkey	53.16	
	Gennadiy Gorbenko	Ukraine	DNF	

== Participation ==
According to an unofficial count, 20 athletes from 17 countries participated in the event.

- Belarus (1)
- Belgium (1)
- Czech Republic (2)
- France (1)
- Germany (2)
- Great Britain (1)
- Greece (1)
- Ireland (1)
- Italy (1)
- Latvia (1)
- Poland (2)
- Russia (1)
- Slovakia (1)
- Spain (1)
- Switzerland (1)
- Turkey (1)
- Ukraine (1)
