= Athletics at the 1999 Summer Universiade – Men's 400 metres hurdles =

The men's 400 metres hurdles event at the 1999 Summer Universiade was held at the Estadio Son Moix in Palma de Mallorca, Spain on 10, 11 and 12 July.

== Medalists ==
Gold	Silver	Bronze
Paweł Januszewski; Poland	Bayano Kamani; United States	Marcel Schelbert; Switzerland

== Results ==
=== Heats ===
Rank	Heat	Athlete	Nationality	Time	Notes
1	3	Paweł Januszewski	Poland	49.93	Q
2	3	Cleverson da Silva	Brazil	49.99	Q
3	1	Steffen Kolb	Germany	50.03	Q
4	3	Ken Yoshizawa	Japan	50.12	q
5	4	Massimo Redaelli	Italy	50.19	Q, SB
6	6	Alexandre Marchand	Canada	50.21	Q
7	1	Costas Pochanis	Cyprus	50.23	Q, SB
8	1	Dai Tamesue	Japan	50.25	q
9	4	Bayano Kamani	United States	50.28	Q
10	6	Jan Schneider	Germany	50.32	Q
11	2	Chris Rawlinson	Great Britain	50.33	Q
12	4	Hennie Botha	South Africa	50.53	q
13	2	Corey Murdock	United States	50.62	Q
14	5	Patrick Ottoz	Italy	50.65	Q
15	1	Periklis Iakovakis	Greece	50.74	q
16	5	Marcel Schelbert	Switzerland	50.80	Q
17	2	Monte Raymond	Canada	50.87	
18	6	Roman Voronkov	Ukraine	51.07	PB
19	6	Iliya Dzhivondov	Bulgaria	51.15	
20	5	Brian Liddy	Ireland	51.16	SB
21	3	Andrey Vinnitskiy	Ukraine	51.39	
22	4	Oscar Pitillas	Spain	51.40	
23	2	Kenneth Enyiazu	Nigeria	51.43	
24	1	Erkinjon Isakov	Russia	51.49	
25	4	Chen Ching-fa	Chinese Taipei	51.94	
26	5	Matthew Douglas	Great Britain	52.07	
27	2	Iñigo Monreal	Spain	52.13	
28	1	Ibrahima Diouf	Senegal	52.24	
29	5	Chen Tien-wen	Chinese Taipei	52.45	
30	3	Paulo Villar	Colombia	52.79	
30	6	Peter Andersson	Sweden	52.79	
32	5	Souleymane Doumbouya	Senegal	52.94	
33	2	David Bergdahl	Sweden	53.17	
34	4	Víctor Mendoza	Peru	53.39	
35	2	Iztok Hodnik	Slovenia	54.42	
	1	Henrik Vincentsen	Denmark	DQ	
	3	Anders Sækmose	Denmark	DNF	
	3	Filip Salov	Russia	DNF	
	6	Indrek Tustit	Estonia	DNF	
	6	Mitja Bračič	Slovenia	DNF	
	4	James Mwangi	Kenya	DNS	
	5	Rohan Robinson	Australia	DNS	
	6	Carlos Silva	Portugal	DNS	

=== Semifinals ===
Rank	Heat	Athlete	Nationality	Time	Notes
1	1	Marcel Schelbert	Switzerland	48.89	Q, PB
2	1	Paweł Januszewski	Poland	48.97	Q, SB
3	1	Bayano Kamani	United States	49.09	Q
4	1	Chris Rawlinson	Great Britain	49.36	q, PB
5	2	Cleverson da Silva	Brazil	49.43	Q, PB
6	2	Corey Murdock	United States	49.46	Q
7	2	Alexandre Marchand	Canada	49.51	Q, PB
8	1	Periklis Iakovakis	Greece	49.80	q, PB
9	2	Dai Tamesue	Japan	49.84	
10	1	Massimo Redaelli	Italy	49.87	SB
11	2	Costas Pochanis	Cyprus	49.88	PB
12	1	Jan Schneider	Germany	49.89	SB
13	2	Steffen Kolb	Germany	50.02	SB
14	1	Ken Yoshizawa	Japan	50.17	
15	2	Hennie Botha	South Africa	50.68	
16	2	Patrick Ottoz	Italy	1:10.49	

=== Final ===
Rank	Athlete	Nationality	Time	Notes
1st place, gold medalist(s)	Paweł Januszewski	Poland	48.64	SB
2nd place, silver medalist(s)	Bayano Kamani	United States	48.74	
3rd place, bronze medalist(s)	Marcel Schelbert	Switzerland	48.77	PB
4	Corey Murdock	United States	48.85	
5	Chris Rawlinson	Great Britain	48.88	
6	Cleverson da Silva	Brazil	49.28	
7	Alexandre Marchand	Canada	49.72	
	Periklis Iakovakis	Greece	DNS	
