= 2009 Asian Athletics Championships – Men's 400 metres hurdles =

The men's 400 metres hurdles event at the 2009 Asian Athletics Championships was held at the Guangdong Olympic Stadium on November 12–13.

== Medalists ==
Gold	Silver	Bronze
Kenji Narisako; Japan	Joseph Abraham; India	Mubarak Sultana Al-Nobi; Qatar

== Results ==
=== Heats ===
Rank	Heat	Name	Nationality	Time	Notes
1	1	Kenji Narisako	Japan	49.91	Q
2	1	Mubarak Sultana Al-Nobi	Qatar	50.42	Q
3	1	Joseph Abraham	India	50.42	Q
4	1	Viktor Leptikov	Kazakhstan	50.81	q, PB
5	2	Bandar Yahya Sharahili	Saudi Arabia	51.14	Q
6	1	Edrees Abdulaziz Hawsawi	Saudi Arabia	51.55	q
7	2	Kazuaki Yoshida	Japan	51.75	Q
8	2	Yevgeniy Meleshenko	Kazakhstan	51.92	Q
9	2	Chen Dayu	China	52.51	
10	1	Artem Dyatlov	Uzbekistan	52.53	
11	1	Narongdech Janjai	Thailand	52.58	
12	2	Ajith Yasasiri	Sri Lanka	53.91	
	2	Ali Obaid Shirook	United Arab Emirates	DNF	

=== Final ===
Rank	Lane	Name	Nationality	Time	Notes
1st place, gold medalist(s)	6	Kenji Narisako	Japan	49.22	
2nd place, silver medalist(s)	8	Joseph Abraham	India	49.96	
3rd place, bronze medalist(s)	5	Mubarak Sultana Al-Nobi	Qatar	50.19	
4	4	Bandar Yahya Sharahili	Saudi Arabia	50.24	
5	7	Yevgeniy Meleshenko	Kazakhstan	51.47	
6	2	Viktor Leptikov	Kazakhstan	51.59	
7	3	Kazuaki Yoshida	Japan	51.91	
	1	Edrees Abdulaziz Hawsawi	Saudi Arabia	DNS	
