= Athletics at the 2003 Summer Universiade – Men's 4 × 400 metres relay =

The men's 4 × 400 metres relay event at the 2003 Summer Universiade was held in Daegu, South Korea on 29 and 30 August.

== Results ==
=== Heats ===
Rank	Heat	Nation	Athletes	Time	Notes
1	1	Japan	Yoshihiro Horigome, Hideo Togashi, Shinji Takahira, Yoshiaki Kitaoka	3:06.98	Q
1	2	Russia	Dimitry Petrov, Andrey Semenov, Andrey Polukeyev, Igor Vasilyev	3:07.11	Q
2	2	Thailand	Banjong Lachua, Weera Kongsri, Suphachai Phacsai, Narong Nilploy	3:08.97	Q
2	1	Ukraine	Volodymyr Demchenko, Yevgeniy Zyukov, Hennadiy Horbenko, Andriy Tverdostup	3:09.01	Q
3	2	South Korea	Son Jung-ho, Lee Sang-jun, Lee Sang-in, Kim Yong-sam	3:15.52	Q
3	1	Great Britain	Ashley Swain, James Chatt, Bradley Yiend, Adam Potter	3:16.20	Q
4	2	New Zealand	Sam Higgie, Tim Hawkes, Max Smith, Craig Bearda	3:17.29	q
5	2	Hong Kong	Ryan Lai Ka Pun, Eric Chan Chi Hong, So Hoi Nam, Que Yin Tik	3:25.53	q
4	1	Macau	Cheong Man Fong, Lam Ting Pang, Iao Kuan Un, Chang Wa Ieng	3:30.39	
5	1	Sri Lanka	Kulan Arunajith, Vajira Kularatne, Ravindra Jayasinghe, S. M. P. S. D. Pathirana	3:31.51	

=== Final ===
Rank	Nation	Athletes	Time	Notes
1st place, gold medalist(s)	Ukraine	Volodymyr Demchenko, Yevgeniy Zyukov, Hennadiy Horbenko, Andriy Tverdostup	3:03.15	
2nd place, silver medalist(s)	Russia	Dimitry Petrov, Andrey Semenov, Sergey Babayev, Igor Vasilyev	3:04.78	
3rd place, bronze medalist(s)	Great Britain	Matthew Douglas, James Chatt, Bradley Yiend, Adam Potter	3:05.54	
4	Japan	Yoshihiro Horigome, Hideo Togashi, Shinji Takahira, Yoshiaki Kitaoka	3:05.97	
5	New Zealand	Sam Higgie, Gareth Hyett, Tim Hawkes, Craig Bearda	3:13.89	
6	South Korea	Son Jung-ho, Lee Sang-jun, Lee Sang-in, Kim Yong-sam	3:14.87	
7	Hong Kong	Ryan Lai Ka Pun, Eric Chan Chi Hong, So Hoi Nam, Que Yin Tik	3:35.91	
	Thailand		DNS	
