= 2007 Asian Athletics Championships – Men's 400 metres hurdles =

The men's 400 metres hurdles event at the 2007 Asian Athletics Championships was held in Amman, Jordan on July 26–27.

== Medalists ==
Gold	Silver	Bronze
Yevgeniy Meleshenko; Kazakhstan	Yosuke Tsushima; Japan	Joseph Abraham; India

== Results ==
=== Heats ===
Rank	Heat	Name	Nationality	Time	Notes
1	2	Masahira Yoshikata	Japan	50.60	Q
2	2	Joseph Abraham	India	50.91	Q
3	2	Idris Abdelaziz Al-Housaoui	Saudi Arabia	51.22	Q
4	1	Yosuke Tsushima	Japan	51.33	Q
5	2	Aleksey Pogorelov	Kyrgyzstan	51.34	q
6	1	Yevgeniy Meleshenko	Kazakhstan	51.59	Q
7	1	Gholam Reza Karimi	Iran	51.80	Q
8	1	Kuldev Singh	India	51.92	q
9	2	Shahadan Jamaludin	Malaysia	53.28	
10	2	Viktor Leptikov	Kazakhstan	53.32	
11	1	Zulkarnain Purba	Indonesia	54.14	
	2	Afzal Hossain	Bangladesh	DNF	

=== Final ===
Rank	Lane	Name	Nationality	Time	Notes
1st place, gold medalist(s)	4	Yevgeniy Meleshenko	Kazakhstan	50.01	
2nd place, silver medalist(s)	5	Yosuke Tsushima	Japan	50.14	
3rd place, bronze medalist(s)	6	Joseph Abraham	India	50.28	
4	3	Masahira Yoshikata	Japan	50.94	
5	2	Gholam Reza Karimi	Iran	51.14	
6	2	Idris Abdelaziz Al-Housaoui	Saudi Arabia	51.22	
7	8	Kuldev Singh	India	51.71	
8	1	Aleksey Pogorelov	Kyrgyzstan	52.25	
