= Hideaki Kawamura =

Japanese hurdler (born 1974)

Personal information
- Full name: Hideaki Kawamura
- Nationality: Japanese
- Born: 15 September 1974 (age 52) Miyagi Prefecture, Japan
- Height: 5.8 ft (1.75 m)
- Weight: 148 lb (67 kg)

Sport
- Country: Japan
- Sport: 400 metres hurdler
- Events: 1998 Asian Games, 1996 Summer Olympics, 2000 Summer Olympics
Medal record
Men's athletics
Representing Japan
Asian Games
Gold medal – first place	1998 Bangkok	400 m hurdles
Asian Championships
Silver medal – second place	1995 Jakarta	400 m hurdles
Silver medal – second place	1998 Fukuoka	400 m hurdles
Silver medal – second place	2002 Colombo	400 m hurdles
Bronze medal – third place	2002 Colombo	4×400 m

Hideaki Kawamura (Japanese: 河村 英昭; born 15 September 1974 in Miyagi Prefecture) is a Japanese former 400 metres hurdler who competed in the 1996 Summer Olympics and in the 2000 Summer Olympics.

His personal best in the event is 48.84 seconds, set in 2000.

== Competition record ==
Year	Competition	Venue	Position	Event	Notes
Representing Japan
1992	Asian Junior Championships	New Delhi, India	3rd	110 m hurdles	14.78
1992	Asian Junior Championships	New Delhi, India	3rd	400 m hurdles	52.08
1995	Asian Championships	Jakarta, Indonesia	2nd	400 m hurdles	50.45
1996	Olympic Games	Atlanta, United States	32nd (h)	400 m hurdles	49.88
1997	Universiade	Catania, Italy	14th (sf)	400 m hurdles	50.45
1998	Asian Championships	Fukuoka, Japan	2nd	400 m hurdles	49.69
1998	Asian Games	Bangkok, Thailand	1st	400 m hurdles	49.59
1999	World Championships	Seville, Spain	22nd (h)	400 m hurdles	49.66
2000	Olympic Games	Sydney, Australia	30th (h)	400 m hurdles	50.68
2001	World Championships	Edmonton, Canada	32nd (h)	400 m hurdles	50.61
2002	Asian Championships	Colombo, Sri Lanka	2nd	400 m hurdles	48.85
