= Damjan Zlatnar =

Slovenian-born Serbian former athlete (born 1977)

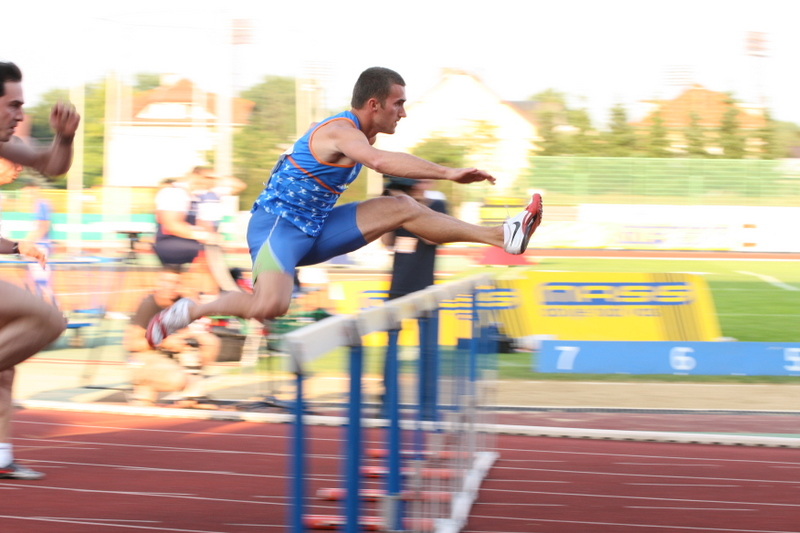
- Damjan Zlatnar in 2007

Personal information
- Born: 16 December 1977 (age 48) Ljubljana, Yugoslavia

Sport
- Sport: Track and field

Damjan Zlatnar (Serbian Cyrillic: Дамјан Златнар, born 16 December 1977) is a Slovenian-born Serbian former athlete who specialized in the 110 metre hurdles and bobsledder.

He competed for Slovenia at the 1999 World Indoor Championships, the 2001 World Championships the 2004 Olympic Games, the 2007 European Indoor Championships, the 2007 World Championships, the 2008 World Indoor Championships and the 2008 Olympic Games without reaching the final round.

His personal best time is 13.56 seconds, achieved in June 2007 in Novo Mesto.

Zlatnar switched nationality and competed for Serbia at the FIBT World Championships 2012 in Bobsleigh Two man. He is now an athletics coach, coaching, among others, Agata Zupin and Jure Grkman.
