= 2007 Asian Athletics Championships – Men's 4 × 400 metres relay =

The men's 4 × 400 metres relay event at the 2007 Asian Athletics Championships was held in Amman, Jordan on July 29.

== Results ==
Rank	Team	Name	Time	Notes
1st place, gold medalist(s)	Saudi Arabia	Yonas Al-Hosah, Mohammed Shaween, Ismail Al-Sabani, Mohammed Obeid Al-Salhi	3:05.96	
2nd place, silver medalist(s)	Sri Lanka	Dulan Priyasu, Rohitha Pusup, Shivant Weerasuriya, Asnaka Jayas	3:07.29	
3rd place, bronze medalist(s)	India	Sarish Paul, Joseph Abraham, Mortaja Shake, K. M. Mathew	3:07.94	
4	Iran	Gholam Reza Karimi, Sajjad Moradi, Afekian Mohammad, Reza Bouazar	3:08.64	
5	Philippines	Julius Nierras, Erine Canelario, Aing Jimar, Junrey Bano	3:11.69	
6	Kazakhstan	Boris Khamzin, Viktor Leptikov, Andrey Ageyev, Yevgeniy Meleshenko	3:13.80	
7	Singapore	Shafiq Kashmiri, Khoo Kian Seong Ken, Teng Wei Yang, Muthukumaran Radhakrishnan	3:14.29	
8	Malaysia	Narendran Shanmuganathan, Mohd Zafril Mohd Zuslaini, Shahadan Jamaludin, Muhamad Zaiful Zainal Abidin	3:15.58	
