= Hennadiy Horbenko =

Ukrainian hurdler (1975–2025)

Personal information
- Born: 22 September 1975 Dnipro, Soviet Union
- Died: 28 March 2025 (aged 49) Dnipro, Ukraine
Medal record
Men's athletics
Representing Ukraine
World Junior Championships
Gold medal – first place	1994 Lisbon	400 m hurdles
Summer Universiade
Gold medal – first place	2003 Daegu	4×400 metres relay
Military World Games
Silver medal – second place	1999 Zagreb	4×100 metres relay

Hennadiy Anatoliyovych Horbenko (Ukrainian: Геннадій Анатолійович Горбенко; 22 September 1975 – 28 March 2025) was a Ukrainian hurdler.

Horbenko won the gold medal at the 1994 World Junior Championships, and in other age-specific events he finished fourth at the 1995 Summer Universiade, failed to finish the race at the 1997 European U23 Championships, and finished fifth at the 2003 Summer Universiade.

On global level, his main achievement individually was the 8th place at the 2000 Olympic Games. In the Olympic semi-final, he set his lifetime best of 48.40 seconds. He also competed at the 1995 and 2001 World Championships without reaching the final.

Horbenko also saw success in relay races. He won a silver medal in the 4 × 100 metres relay at the 1999 Military World Games. In the 4 × 400 metres relay he won a gold medal at the 2003 Summer Universiade. At the 2000 Olympic Games, the Ukrainian 4 × 400 team did not reach the final.

Horbenko died on 28 March 2025, at the age of 49.
