= 2002 Asian Athletics Championships – Men's 4 × 400 metres relay =

The men's 4 × 400 metres relay event at the 2002 Asian Athletics Championships was held in Colombo, Sri Lanka on 12 August.

== Results ==
Rank	Nation	Athletes	Time	Notes
1st place, gold medalist(s)	Sri Lanka	Rohan Pradeep Kumara, Ranga Wimalawansa, Prasanna Amarasekara, Sugath Thilakaratne	3:03.35	
2nd place, silver medalist(s)	India	Satbir Singh, K. Suresh, Anil Kumar Rohil, Jata Shankar	3:06.76	
3rd place, bronze medalist(s)	Japan	Suguru Matsumoto, Yukihiro Mukai, Yoshihiro Chiba, Hideaki Kawamura	3:07.09	
4	Philippines		3:11.85	
5	Hong Kong		3:17.35	NR
	Kuwait		DNS	
