= Viktor Leptikov =

Kazakhstani hurdler

Personal information
- Born: July 2, 1987 (age 39) Kzyl-Orda, Kazakh SSR, Soviet Union
- Height: 1.96 m (6 ft 5 in)
- Weight: 80 kg (180 lb)

Sport
- Country: Kazakhstan
- Sport: Athletics
- Event: 400m Hurdles

Viktor Leptikov is a Kazakhstani hurdler. At the 2012 Summer Olympics, he competed in the Men's 400 metres hurdles.

== Competition record ==
Year	Competition	Venue	Position	Event	Notes
Representing Kazakhstan
2003	World Youth Championships	Sherbrooke, Canada	42nd (h)	800 m	2:00.39
2007	Asian Championships	Amman, Jordan	10th (h)	400 m hurdles	53.32
2007	Asian Championships	Amman, Jordan	6th	4 × 400 m relay	3:13.80
2009	Universiade	Belgrade, Serbia	7th	400 m hurdles	50.63
2009	Asian Championships	Guangzhou, China	6th	400 m hurdles	51.59
2010	Asian Games	Guangzhou, China	5th	400 m hurdles	52.45
2012	Olympic Games	London, United Kingdom	43rd (h)	400 m hurdles	51.67
2013	Asian Championships	Pune, India	–	400 m hurdles	DNF
