= Athletics at the 2003 Summer Universiade – Men's 400 metres hurdles =

The men's 400 metres hurdles event at the 2003 Summer Universiade was held in Daegu, South Korea on 27, 28 and 30 August.

== Medalists ==
Gold	Silver	Bronze
Thomas Kortbeek; Netherlands	Matthew Douglas; Great Britain	Hendrick Botha; South Africa

== Results ==
=== Heats ===
Rank	Heat	Athlete	Nationality	Time	Notes
1	3	Thomas Kortbeek	Netherlands	50.42	Q
2	3	Hendrick Botha	South Africa	50.49	Q
3	3	Roman Matveyev	Russia	50.72	Q
4	1	Aleksandr Derevyagin	Russia	51.32	Q
5	1	Hennadiy Horbenko	Ukraine	51.41	Q
6	1	Martin Leiser	Switzerland	51.53	Q
7	4	Matthew Douglas	Great Britain	51.59	Q
8	2	Marthinus Kritzinger	South Africa	51.61	Q
9	2	Naohiro Kawakita	Japan	51.95	Q
10	2	Bradley Yiend	Great Britain	52.09	Q
11	4	Masahira Yoshikata	Japan	52.22	Q
12	3	Andriy Fatyeyev	Ukraine	52.25	q
13	3	Apisit Kuttiyawan	Thailand	52.29	q
14	2	Gianni Carabelli	Italy	52.33	q
15	4	Andrey Kozlovskiy	Belarus	52.58	Q
16	1	Yiannis Ioannou	Cyprus	52.78	q
17	4	Roberto Carvajal	Mexico	52.98	
18	1	Jeerachai Linglom	Thailand	53.35	
19	2	Son Jung-ho	South Korea	53.84	
20	4	Zulkarnaein Purba	Indonesia	53.85	
21	3	Olau Thommassen	Denmark	54.11	
22	4	Kürşat Çalışkan	Turkey	54.24	
23	2	Jonnie Lowe	Honduras	56.64	
24	1	Ravindra Jayasinghe	Sri Lanka	56.87	
25	1	Lam Ting Pong	Macau	57.17	
26	2	Kulan Arunajith	Sri Lanka	58.25	

=== Semifinals ===
Rank	Heat	Athlete	Nationality	Time	Notes
1	1	Matthew Douglas	Great Britain	48.54	Q
2	1	Hendrick Botha	South Africa	49.35	Q
3	2	Hennadiy Horbenko	Ukraine	49.49	Q
4	2	Aleksandr Derevyagin	Russia	49.54	Q
5	1	Thomas Kortbeek	Netherlands	49.63	Q
6	1	Roman Matveyev	Russia	49.73	Q
7	1	Masahira Yoshikata	Japan	49.80	
8	2	Naohiro Kawakita	Japan	49.91	Q
9	2	Martin Leiser	Switzerland	50.29	Q
10	2	Marthinus Kritzinger	South Africa	50.32	
11	1	Andrey Kozlovskiy	Belarus	50.63	
12	2	Bradley Yiend	Great Britain	50.96	
13	2	Apisit Kuttiyawan	Thailand	50.97	
14	2	Gianni Carabelli	Italy	51.06	
15	1	Yiannis Ioannou	Cyprus	51.35	
16	1	Andriy Fatyeyev	Ukraine	52.16	

=== Final ===
Rank	Lane	Athlete	Nationality	Time	Notes
1st place, gold medalist(s)	2	Thomas Kortbeek	Netherlands	48.95	NU23R
2nd place, silver medalist(s)	3	Matthew Douglas	Great Britain	49.26	
3rd place, bronze medalist(s)	4	Hendrick Botha	South Africa	49.51	
4	7	Roman Matveyev	Russia	49.66	
5	6	Hennadiy Horbenko	Ukraine	49.77	
6	5	Aleksandr Derevyagin	Russia	50.01	
7	8	Naohiro Kawakita	Japan	50.03	
8	1	Martin Leiser	Switzerland	50.28	PB
