= 2005 World Championships in Athletics – Men's 400 metres hurdles =

The men's 400 metres hurdles event at the 2005 World Championships in Athletics was held at the Helsinki Olympic Stadium on August 6, 7 and 9.

== Medalists ==
Gold	Bershawn Jackson; United States (USA)
Silver	James Carter; United States (USA)
Bronze	Dai Tamesue; Japan (JPN)

== Summary ==
The final was run in wet conditions following a rain story. Running in lane 2, defending champion Félix Sánchez was out with the field. Just after clearing the first hurdle, he pulled up, grabbing his right hamstring. By the third hurdle Bershawn Jackson in lane 6 had a slight lead. By the fifth, the lead had evaporated and James Carter in lane 3 had edged ahead. As Jackson continued to fade back, Dai Tamesue, to his outside in lane 7 began to separate. Tamesue assumed the lead through the final turn, entering the final straight with almost 2 metres on the Americans. Jackson put on a burst of speed, catching Tamesue over the ninth hurdle and never looking back. Deflated Tamesue was trying to hold on as Jackson and then Carter pulled away. Jackson's burst put him in first place to stay, beating Carter with a lean by over a meter. Sensing Kerron Clement gaining across the track in lane 1, Tamesue began leaning for the finish 5 metres out, falling across the finish line ahead of Clement for bronze.

== Results ==
All times shown are in seconds.
Q denotes qualification by place.
q denotes qualification by time.
DNS denotes did not start.
DNF denotes did not finish.
AR denotes area record
NR denotes national record.
PB denotes personal best.
SB denotes season's best.

=== Heats ===
August 6

==== Heat 1 ====
1. (United States) Kerron Clement 48.98 Q
2. (Jamaica) Danny McFarlane 49.37 Q
3. (South Africa) Pieter de Villiers 49.81 Q
4. (Cuba) Yacnier Luis 49.96 Q
5. (Germany) Christian Duma 50.04 q
6. (Mali) Ibrahim Maïga 50.62
7. (Mozambique) Kurt Couto 52.04

==== Heat 2 ====
1. (Jamaica) Kemel Thompson 49.33 Q
2. (France) Naman Keïta 49.58 Q
3. (Italy) Gianni Carabelli 49.87 Q
4. (Japan) Kenji Narisako 49.87 Q
5. (Finland) Ari-Pekka Lattu 50.23 q
6. (Sweden) Mikael Jakobsson 50.35

==== Heat 3 ====
1. (United States) Bershawn Jackson 49.34 Q
2. (Dominican Republic) Felix Sánchez 49.47 Q
3. (Kazakhstan) Yevgeniy Meleshenko 49.67 Q
4. (South Africa) Llewellyn Herbert 49.98 Q
5. (Cuba) Sergio Hierrezuelo 50.13 q
6. (Spain) Eduardo Iván Rodríguez 50.22 q
7. (Kyrgyzstan) Aleksey Pogorelov 53.44

==== Heat 4 ====
1. (Greece) Periklis Iakovakis 49.22 Q
2. (South Africa) L.J. van Zyl 49.35 Q
3. (United Kingdom) Rhys Williams 49.73 Q
4. (Jamaica) Dean Griffiths 49.79 Q
5. (Liberia) O'Neil Wright 50.90
- (Czech Republic) Jirí Mužík DSQ

==== Heat 5 ====
1. (Greece) James Carter 49.05 Q
2. (Japan) Dai Tamesue 49.17 Q
3. (Panama) Bayano Kamani 49.18 Q
4. (Saudi Arabia) Hadi Soua'an Al-Somaily 49.70 Q
5. (Hungary) Ákos Dezsö 51.36
6. (Tonga) 'Aleki Toetu'u Sapoi 56.06
- (Portugal) Edivaldo Monteiro DNF

=== Semifinals ===
August 7

==== Heat 1 ====
1. (United States) James Carter 47.78 Q (SB)
2. (Panama) Bayano Kamani 47.84 Q (AR)
3. (Dominican Republic) Felix Sánchez 48.24 q (SB)
4. (Japan) Dai Tamesue 48.46 q (SB)
5. (South Africa) Pieter de Villiers 49.75
6. (Jamaica) Dean Griffiths 48.89
7. (Spain) Eduardo Iván Rodríguez 49.97 (SB)
8. (Germany) Christian Duma 50.25

==== Heat 2 ====
1. (South Africa) L.J. van Zyl 48.16 Q (PB)
2. (United States) Kerron Clement 48.49 Q
3. (Japan) Kenji Narisako 49.00
4. (Kazakhstan) Yevgeniy Meleshenko 49.22
5. (Jamaica) Danny McFarlane 49.41
6. (United Kingdom) Rhys Williams 49.67
7. (Finland) Ari-Pekka Lattu 49.81
- (Cuba) Yacnier Luis DSQ

==== Heat 3 ====
1. (United States) Bershawn Jackson 48.19 Q
2. (France) Naman Keïta 48.60 Q
3. (Jamaica) Kemel Thompson 48.64
4. (Saudi Arabia) Hadi Soua'an Al-Somaily 49.09
5. (Greece) Periklis Iakovakis 49.28
6. (Cuba) Sergio Hierrezuelo 49.66
7. (Italy) Gianni Carabelli 49.77
8. (South Africa) Llewellyn Herbert 50.69

=== Final ===
August 9

1. (United States) Bershawn Jackson 47.30 (PB)
2. (United States) James Carter 47.43 (PB)
3. (Japan) Dai Tamesue 48.10 (SB)
4. (United States) Kerron Clement 48.18
5. (France) Naman Keïta 48.28
6. (South Africa) L.J. van Zyl 48.54
7. (Panama) Bayano Kamani 50.18
- (Dominican Republic) Felix Sánchez DNF
