= Kenji Narisako =

Japanese hurdler (born 1984)

Personal information
- Nationality: Japanese
- Born: 25 July 1984 (age 42) Saiki, Ōita, Japan
- Height: 1.85 m (6 ft 1 in)
- Weight: 71 kg (157 lb)

Sport
- Sport: Track and field
- Event: 400m Hurdles
- University team: University of Tsukuba

Achievements and titles
- Personal bests: 400 m: 46.02 (Okayama 2005); 400 m Hurdles: 47.93 (Yokohama 2006)
Medal record
Men's athletics
Representing Japan
Asian Games
Gold medal – first place	2006 Doha	400 m Hurdles
Asian Championships
Gold medal – first place	2009 Guangzhou	400 m Hurdles
Gold medal – first place	2009 Guangzhou	4×400 m relay
Universiade
Gold medal – first place	2005 İzmir	400 m Hurdles
Silver medal – second place	2005 İzmir	4×400 m relay
World Youth Championships
Bronze medal – third place	2001 Debrecen	400 m Hurdles

Kenji Narisako (成迫 健児, Narisako Kenji) (born 25 July 1984) is a Japanese hurdler.

He won the bronze medal at the 2001 World Youth Championships, and the gold medals at the 2005 Summer Universiade and the 2006 Asian Games. He also competed at the World Championships in 2005 and 2007 and the 2008 Olympic Games without reaching the final.

His personal best time is 47.93 seconds, achieved in May 2006 in Osaka.

After his Olympic appearances, Narisako became a member of the Ōita Prefectural Assembly.

== Personal bests ==
Event	Time	Venue	Date	Notes
400 m	46.02 s	Okayama, Japan	26 October 2005	
400 m hurdles	47.93 s	Yokohama, Japan	6 May 2006	Japan's 2nd-fastest time

== Records ==
- 4 × 100 m relay
  - Former Japanese youth best holder - 40.14 s (relay leg: 4th) (Debrecen, 15 July 2001)^{[a]}
- 4 × 400 m relay
  - Current Japanese university record holder - 3:03.20 s (relay leg: 4th) (İzmir, 20 August 2005)^{[b]}

^{a} with Masaya Aikawa, Shōta Abe, and Masami Yasuda
^{b} with Kazunori Ōta, Yoshihiro Horigome, and Yūki Yamaguchi

== Competition record ==
Year	Competition	Venue	Position	Event	Notes
Representing Japan
2001	World Youth Championships	Debrecen, Hungary	3rd	400 m hurdles (84.0 cm)	52.09
2001	World Youth Championships	Debrecen, Hungary	5th	Medley relay	1:52.60 (relay leg: 4th)
2002	World Junior Championships	Kingston, Jamaica	31st (h)	400 m hurdles	54.10
2005	World Championships	Helsinki, Finland	10th (sf)	400 m hurdles	49.00
2005	World Championships	Helsinki, Finland	– (h)	4 × 400 m relay	DQ (relay leg: 2nd)
2005	Universiade	İzmir, Turkey	1st	400 m hurdles	48.96
2005	Universiade	İzmir, Turkey	2nd	4 × 400 m relay	3:03.20 (relay leg: 4th) NUR
2006	Asian Games	Doha, Qatar	1st	400 m hurdles	48.78
2006	Asian Games	Doha, Qatar	4th	4 × 400 m relay	3:07.07 (relay leg: 4th)
2007	World Championships	Osaka, Japan	7th (sf)	400 m hurdles	48.44
2007	World Championships	Osaka, Japan	10th (h)	4 × 400 m relay	3:02.76 (relay leg: 3rd)
2008	Olympics	Beijing, China	17th (h)	400 m hurdles	49.63
2008	Olympics	Beijing, China	14th (h)	4 × 400 m relay	3:04.18 (relay leg: 4th)
2009	World Championships	Berlin, Germany	16th (h)	400 m hurdles	49.60
2009	Asian Championships	Guangzhou, China	1st	400 m hurdles	49.22
2009	Asian Championships	Guangzhou, China	1st	4 × 400 m relay	3:04.13 (relay leg: 2nd)
2010	Asian Games	Guangzhou, China	– (f)	400 m hurdles	DQ

=== National Championship ===
Year	Competition	Venue	Position	Event	Notes
2004	Japan Championships	Tottori, Tottori	4th	400 m hurdles	49.80
2005	Japan Championships	Tokyo	2nd	400 m hurdles	49.44
2006	Japan Championships	Kobe, Hyōgo Prefecture	1st	400 m hurdles	48.95
2007	Japan Championships	Osaka, Osaka Prefecture	2nd	400 m hurdles	49.01
2008	Japan Championships	Kawasaki, Kanagawa Prefecture	2nd	400 m hurdles	49.47
2009	Japan Championships	Hiroshima, Hiroshima Prefecture	1st	400 m hurdles	49.53
2010	Japan Championships	Marugame, Kagawa, Kagawa Prefecture	1st	400 m hurdles	49.01
2011	Japan Championships	Kumagaya, Saitama Prefecture	19th (h)	400 m hurdles	51.35
2012	Japan Championships	Osaka, Osaka Prefecture	29th (h)	400 m hurdles	56.22
