= Athletics at the 2006 Asian Games – Men's 4 × 400 metres relay =

Men's 4 × 400 metres relay at the 2006 Asian Games
- Venue: Khalifa International Stadium
- Dates: 12 December 2006
- Competitors: 32 from 8 nations

Medalists
gold medal	Saudi Arabia; Ismail Al-Sabiani, Hamed Al-Bishi, Mohammed Al-Salhi, Hamdan Al-Bishi
silver medal	India; Aboo Backer, Joseph Abraham, Bhupinder Singh, K. M. Binu
bronze medal	Sri Lanka; Rohan Pradeep Kumara, Rohitha Pushpakumara, Prasanna Amarasekara, Ashoka Jayasundara

The men's 4 × 400 metres relay competition at the 2006 Asian Games in Doha, Qatar was held on 12 December 2006 at the Khalifa International Stadium.

== Schedule ==
All times are Arabia Standard Time (UTC+03:00)

Date	Time	Event
Tuesday, 12 December 2006	19:05	Final

== Records ==
Prior to this competition, the existing world, Asian and Games records were as follows.

World Record	~~United States~~; United States	~~2:54.20~~; 2:54.29	~~Uniondale, United States~~; Stuttgart, Germany	~~22 July 1998~~; 22 August 1993
Asian Record	Japan	3:00.76	Atlanta, United States	3 August 1996
Games Record	Japan	3:01.70	Bangkok, Thailand	19 December 1998

- United States's world record was rescinded in 2008.

== Results ==
Legend

- DSQ — Disqualified

Rank	Team	Time	Notes
1st place, gold medalist(s)	Saudi Arabia (KSA); Ismail Al-Sabiani; Hamed Al-Bishi; Mohammed Al-Salhi; Hamdan Al-Bishi	3:05.31	
2nd place, silver medalist(s)	India (IND); Aboo Backer; Joseph Abraham; Bhupinder Singh; K. M. Binu	3:06.65	
3rd place, bronze medalist(s)	Sri Lanka (SRI); Rohan Pradeep Kumara; Rohitha Pushpakumara; Prasanna Amarasekara; Ashoka Jayasundara	3:06.97	
4	Japan (JPN); Yoshihiro Horigome; Yuzo Kanemaru; Yukihiro Mukai; Kenji Narisako	3:07.07	
5	Oman (OMA); Ahmed Al-Wahaibi; Idrees Al-Khusaibi; Mohammed Al-Rawahi; Hammam Al-Farsi	3:11.42	
6	Chinese Taipei (TPE); Chung Chen-kang; Chen Chin-hsuan; Yi Wei-chen; Chang Chi-sheng	3:12.03	
—	United Arab Emirates (UAE); Jasim Al-Junaibi; Ali Al-Balooshi; Abdulla Al-Eidi; Khamis Al-Badwawi	DSQ	
—	Qatar (QAT); Yaser Omar El-Haj; Salem Amer Al-Badri; Adam Abdu Adam; Abdulrahman Suleiman	DSQ	
