= Death of Pratima Gaonkar =

Indian athlete

On 9 October 2001, Pratima Gaonkar, a young Indian intersex athlete and swimmer, was found dead in a well in Goa. The cause was identified as death by suicide; this was in turn caused by Gaonkar's reaction to the disclosure and public commentary surrounding a sex verification test. Gaonkar was reportedly the subject of blackmail attempts, including an accusation by her mother that her coach was accusing her.

Originally from the village of Sadgal, Goa, three months prior to her death she won silver medal in the 4×400 relay in the Junior Asian Athletics Championships in Brunei. She had previously broken all the Goan state-level records for her discipline.

In the aftermath of her death, media attention and reportage was invasive, with a press conference discussing her body in detail. The public discourse which surrounded her death as an intersex athlete has led to comparisons with Dutee Chand and Caster Semenya.
