= 2008 IAAF World Indoor Championships – Men's 60 metres hurdles =

== Medalists ==
Gold
Liu Xiang	China
Silver
Allen Johnson	United States
Bronze
Staņislavs Olijars	Latvia
Evgeniy Borisov	Russia

== Heats ==
Heat	Lane	Name	Country	Mark	Q	React
1	5	Jackson Quiñónez	Spain	7.58	Q	0.168
1	6	Thomas Blaschek	Germany	7.61	Q	0.126
1	4	Adrien Deghelt	Belgium	7.73 PB	Q	0.130
1	3	Damjan Zlatnar	Slovenia	7.76	Q	0.127
1	7	Anselmo da Silva	Brazil	7.80 PB	q	0.123
1	2	Dominik Bochenek	Poland	7.83	q	0.123
2	3	Staņislavs Olijars	Latvia	7.72	Q	0.181
2	4	Liu Xiang	China	7.73 SB	Q	0.105
2	6	Maksim Lynsha	Belarus	7.80	Q	0.259
2	8	Samuel Coco-Viloin	France	7.85	Q	0.154
2	2	Decosma Wright	Jamaica	7.85		0.269
2	7	Shamar Sands	Bahamas	7.97 SB		0.227
2	5	Dayron Robles	Cuba	8.53		0.174
3	4	Petr Svoboda	Czech Republic	7.71	Q	0.163
3	8	Robert Kronberg	Sweden	7.73	Q	0.160
3	7	Yoel Hernández	Cuba	7.74	Q	0.251
3	5	Evgeniy Borisov	Russia	7.79	Q	0.247
3	3	Éder Antonio Souza	Brazil	7.89		0.194
3	2	Yuji Ohashi	Japan	8.01 PB		0.162
3	6	Rayzam Shah Wan Sofian	Malaysia	8.26		0.246
4	4	Allan Scott	United Kingdom	7.64	Q	0.149
4	6	Allen Johnson	United States	7.67	Q	0.171
4	3	Paulo Villar	Colombia	7.68	Q	0.152
4	5	Shi Dongpeng	China	7.72 SB	Q	0.150
4	7	Masato Naito	Japan	7.75 NR	q	0.140
4	2	Stanislav Sajdok	Czech Republic	7.81	q	0.243
5	3	David Oliver	United States	7.59	Q	0.225
5	7	Maurice Wignall	Jamaica	7.61 SB	Q	0.173
5	6	Willi Mathiszik	Germany	7.70	Q	0.146
5	5	Alexandru Mihailescu	Romania	7.88	Q	0.183
5	4	Igor Peremota	Russia	7.93		0.143
5	8	Rene Oruman	Estonia	8.00		0.165
5	2	Toriki Urarii	Tahiti	8.52 PB		0.297

== Semifinals ==
Heat	Lane	Name	Country	Mark	Q	React
1	5	Allan Scott	United Kingdom	7.57	Q	0.159
1	3	Allen Johnson	United States	7.64	Q	0.241
1	8	Shi Dongpeng	China	7.65 SB		0.147
1	4	Robert Kronberg	Sweden	7.75		0.172
1	6	Petr Svoboda	Czech Republic	7.81		0.149
1	2	Masato Naito	Japan	7.85		0.237
1	1	Anselmo da Silva	Brazil	7.94		0.225
1	7	Maksim Lynsha	Belarus	8.03		0.238
2	6	Thomas Blaschek	Germany	7.59	Q	0.120
2	8	Evgeniy Borisov	Russia	7.61	Q	0.142
2	5	Jackson Quiñónez	Spain	7.63	q	0.229
2	7	Adrien Deghelt	Belgium	7.69 PB		0.140
2	3	Maurice Wignall	Jamaica	7.70		0.259
2	4	Paulo Villar	Colombia	7.81		0.259
2	2	Samuel Coco-Viloin	France	7.93		0.242
2	1	Dominik Bochenek	Poland	7.97		0.268
3	5	Liu Xiang	China	7.57 SB	Q	0.177
3	6	Staņislavs Olijars	Latvia	7.60 SB	Q	0.152
3	7	Yoel Hernández	Cuba	7.63	q	0.176
3	4	David Oliver	United States	7.65		0.275
3	3	Willi Mathiszik	Germany	7.76		0.232
3	8	Damjan Zlatnar	Slovenia	7.77		0.129
3	1	Stanislav Sajdok	Czech Republic	7.85		0.214
3	2	Alexandru Mihailescu	Romania	7.96		0.249

== Final ==
Heat	Lane	Name	Country	Mark	React
Gold medal	6	Liu Xiang	China	7.46 SB	0.217
Silver medal	8	Allen Johnson	United States	7.55	0.176
Bronze medal	3	Staņislavs Olijars	Latvia	7.60 SB	0.136
Bronze medal	7	Evgeniy Borisov	Russia	7.60	0.232
5	5	Thomas Blaschek	Germany	7.64	0.198
6	4	Allan Scott	United Kingdom	7.65	0.148
7	1	Jackson Quiñónez	Spain	7.66	0.217
8	2	Yoel Hernández	Cuba	7.91	0.249
