= Bayano Kamani =

Panamanian hurdler

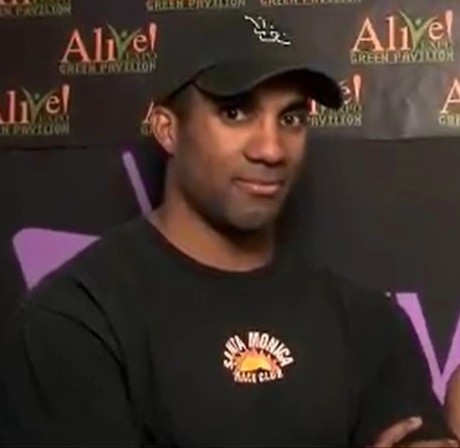
- Kamani in 2008

Personal information
- Nationality: American
- Born: April 17, 1980 (age 46) Houston, Texas

Sport
- Country: United States; Panama
- Sport: Track
- Event: 400m hurdles
- College team: Baylor
- Club: Santa Monica Track Club
Medal record
Representing United States
Summer Universiade
Silver medal – second place	1999 Palma de Mallorca	400m hurdles
Representing Panama
Pan American Games
Silver medal – second place	2007 Rio de Janeiro	400m hurdles
Central American and Caribbean Games
Gold medal – first place	2006 Cartagena	400m hurdles

Bayano Ali Kamani (born 17 April 1980 in Houston, Texas, United States) is a Panamanian hurdler who specialises in the 400 metres hurdles. He is the South American record holder in that event. He competed in the 2004 Olympic Games, placing 5th in the finals. In 2005 he ran the 2nd fastest time in the world of 47.84. He competed at the 2008 Summer Olympics in Beijing, reaching the semi-finals.

Previously competed for Westbury High School in Houston, Texas, and Baylor University where he was inducted to the Athletics Hall of Fame in 2015. He was the 1999 and 2001 NCAA Champion in the 400 hurdles. He was also a part of two of Baylor's victorious 4x400 meters relay teams.

== International competitions ==
Year	Competition	Venue	Position	Event	Notes
Representing United States
1999	Universiade	Palma de Mallorca, Spain	2nd	400 m H	48.74
2001	Universiade	Beijing, China	15th (sf)	400 m H	50.64
Representing Panama
2003	South American Championships	Barquisimeto, Venezuela	1st	400 m H	50.10
2003	World Championships	Paris, France	32nd (h)	400 m H	51.18
2004	Olympic Games	Athens, Greece	5th	400 m H	48.74
2004	World Athletics Final	Monte Carlo, Monaco	5th	400 m H	48.24
2005	World Championships	Helsinki, Finland	7th	400 m H	50.18
2005	World Athletics Final	Monte Carlo, Monaco	6th	400 m H	49.30
2006	Central American and Caribbean Games	Cartagena, Colombia	1st	400 m H	49.44
2007	Pan American Games	Rio de Janeiro, Brazil	2nd	400 m H	48.70
2007	World Championships	Osaka, Japan	12th (sf)	400 m H	49.13
2008	Central American and Caribbean Championships	Cali, Colombia	11th (h)	400 m H	56.45
2008	Olympic Games	Beijing, China	16th (sf)	400 m H	50.48
