= Mubarak Al-Nubi =

Qatari hurdler (born 1977)

Personal information
- Born: 30 December 1977 (age 48)

Sport
- Sport: Track and field
Medal record
Representing Qatar
Summer Universiade
Bronze medal – third place	1997 Catania	400 m hurdles
Asian Games
Silver medal – second place	2002 Busan	400 m hurdles
Asian Championships
Gold medal – first place	1995 Jakarta	400 m hurdles
Gold medal – first place	1998 Fukuoka	400 m hurdles
Gold medal – first place	2002 Colombo	400 m hurdles
Gold medal – first place	2003 Manila	400 m hurdles
Bronze medal – third place	2009 Guangzhou	400 m hurdles

Mubarak Sultan Faraj Al-Nubi (Arabic: مبارك سلطان النوبي فرج; born 30 December 1977) is a retired Qatari athlete who specialized in the 400 metres hurdles. He is the brother of Olympic long jumper Abdul Rahman Al-Nubi. He represented his country at the 2000 Sydney Olympics and competed at the World Championships in Athletics in 1997 and 2003. He was twice a silver medallist at the IAAF World Cup.

At regional level, he won three gold medals in the 400 m hurdles at the Asian Athletics Championships and participated at three Asian Games, being the runner-up in 2002. In addition, he has medals from the Gulf Cooperation Council Athletics Championships and the Arab Athletics Championships. His personal best of 48.17 seconds is the Qatari record for the event.

== International competitions ==
Year	Competition	Venue	Position	Event	Notes
Representing Qatar
1994	Asian Junior Championships	Jakarta, Indonesia	1st	400 m hurdles	51.21
1995	Arab Championships	Cairo, Egypt	2nd	400 m hurdles	50.17
1995	Arab Championships	Cairo, Egypt	2nd	4 × 400 m relay	3:05.64
1995	Asian Championships	Jakarta, Indonesia	1st	400 m hurdles	50.17
1996	World Junior Championships	Sydney, Australia	1st	400m hurdles	49.07
1996	World Junior Championships	Sydney, Australia	—	4 × 400 m relay	DNF
1996	Asian Junior Championships	New Delhi, India	1st	400 m	47.15
1996	Asian Junior Championships	New Delhi, India	1st	400 m hurdles	50.76
1997	Pan Arab Games	Beirut, Lebanon	1st	400 m hurdles	48.95
1997	World Championships	Athens, Greece	12th (sf)	400 m hurdles	48.84
1997	Universiade	Catania, Italy	3rd	400 m hurdles	49.48
1997	Arab Championships	Ta'if, Saudi Arabia	1st	400 m hurdles	49.63
1998	Asian Championships	Fukuoka, Japan	1st	400 m hurdles	48.71
1998	World Cup	Johannesburg, South Africa	2nd	400 m hurdles	48.17
1998	Asian Games	Asian Games	6th (h)	400 m hurdles	51.23
2000	Olympic Games	Sydney, Australia	–	4 × 400 m relay	DQ
2001	Arab Championships	Damascus, Syria	1st	400 m hurdles	50.07
2002	Asian Championships	Colombo, Sri Lanka	1st	400 m hurdles	48.67
2002	World Cup	Madrid, Spain	2nd	400 m hurdles	48.96
2002	Asian Games	Busan, South Korea	2nd	400 m hurdles	48.98
2003	World Championships	Paris, France	7th	400 m hurdles	52.64
2003	Arab Championships	Amman, Jordan	1st	400 m hurdles	49.66
2003	Asian Championships	Manila, Philippines	1st	400 m hurdles	49.19
2005	West Asian Games	Doha, Qatar	1st	400 m hurdles	50.37
2005	West Asian Games	Doha, Qatar	1st	4 × 400 m relay	3:09.81
2006	Asian Games	Doha, Qatar	6th (h)	400 m hurdles	51.28
2009	Arab Championships	Damascus, Syria	3rd	400 m hurdles	51.74
2009	Asian Championships	Guangzhou, China	3rd	400 m hurdles	50.19
2010	West Asian Championships	Aleppo, Syria	3rd	400 m hurdles	51.24
2010	Asian Games	Guangzhou, China	8th (h)	400 m hurdles	51.82
