= Rakesh Kumar Yadav (athlete) =

Indian hammer thrower

Rakesh Kumar yadav
Personal information
- Full name: Rakesh kumar Yadav
- Nickname: Raky
- Nationality: Indian
- Born: 1 February 1981 (age 45) Ballia, Uttar Pradesh, India

Sport
- Country: India
- Sport: Track and field
- Event: Hammer throw

Achievements and titles
- National finals: 7
- Personal bests: outdoor: 70.16 m (17 July 2003, Indian record)
- Updated on 19 September 2009

Rakesh Kumar Yadav (born 1 February 1981) is an Indian track and field athlete from Uttar Pradesh who specializes in Hammer throw. Kumar set the Indian National record of 70.16m in the discipline on 17 July 2003 during the Second National Athletic Circuit Meet in Bangalore. He erased the 70.13 metre mark of Ishtiaq Ahamed set there in the year 2000.
