= Aleksey Pogorelov =

Kyrgyzstani-born Russian hurdler (born 1983)

Aleksey Pogorelov (born 26 March 1983 in Bishkek) is a Kyrgyzstani-born Russian hurdler.

He finished sixth at the 2006 Asian Games. He also competed at the 2005 World Championships and the 2008 Olympic Games without reaching the final.

His personal best time is 49.42 seconds, achieved in June 2008 in Bishkek.

== Competition record ==
Year	Competition	Venue	Position	Event	Notes
Representing Kyrgyzstan
1999	World Youth Championships	Bydgoszcz, Poland	27th (h)	400 m hurdles	56.92
2001	Asian Junior Championships	Bandar Seri Begawan, Brunei	6th	400 m hurdles	53.80
2002	World Junior Championships	Kingston, Jamaica	28th (h)	400 m hurdles	53.48
2002	Asian Junior Championships	Bangkok, Thailand	5th	400 m hurdles	53.17
2005	Islamic Solidarity Games	Mecca, Saudi Arabia	11th (h)	400 m hurdles	51.86
2005	World Championships	Helsinki, Finland	25th (h)	400 m hurdles	53.44
2005	Asian Championships	Incheon, South Korea	9th (h)	400 m hurdles	53.93
2006	Asian Games	Doha, Qatar	6th	400 m hurdles	52.20
2007	Asian Championships	Amman, Jordan	8th	400 m hurdles	52.25
2007	Asian Indoor Games	Macau	9th (sf)	400 m	49.51
2008	Asian Indoor Championships	Doha, Qatar	7th (h)	400 m	49.37
2008	Olympic Games	Beijing, China	23rd (h)	400 m hurdles	51.47
Representing Russia
2011	Universiade	Shenzhen, China	10th (sf)	400 m hurdles	50.50
