= Suranga Adikari =

Sri Lankan athlete

A.M.P. Suranga Adikari is a Sri Lankan athlete who was the national champion in the 400 m hurdles in 2004.

== Biography ==
Suranga Adikari (born 22 September 1979) from Kurunegala, Sri Lanka. Studied at Narammala Mayurapadha National college

He is a Buddhist.

=== International events and achievements ===
- 2002- 14th Asian Athletic Championships, 400m Hurdles – participated
- 2003 – 1st Sri Lanka International Open Athletic Championship 400m Hurdles – Bronze medal
- 2004- 9th SAF games, 400m Hurdles – silver medal

=== National achievements ===
400m Hurdles

- 2002/2003/2004 – Sri Lanka colours man.
- 2002 – National Athletic Championship – Silver Medal
- 2003 – National Athletic Championship – Bronze Medal
- 2004 – National Athletic Championship – Gold Medal
- 2004 – National Athletic Championship, Best Athlete Duncan White Trophy
- 2002–2006 National Athletic pool – participated
