= Matthew Douglas =

British hurdler (born 1976)

Matt Douglas
Personal information
- Nationality: British (English)
- Born: 26 November 1976 (age 49) London, England
- Height: 193 cm (6 ft 4 in)
- Weight: 90 kg (198 lb)

Sport
- Sport: Athletics
- Event: Hurdles
- Club: Belgrave Harriers
Medal record
Representing Great Britain
Summer Universiade
Silver medal – second place	2003 Daegu	400m hurdles
Bronze medal – third place	2003 Daegu	4x400m relay

Matthew Douglas (born 26 November 1976) is a former track and field athlete who specialised in the 400 metres hurdles. He represented Great Britain at two consecutive Summer Olympics starting in 2000. At the Commonwealth Games he first represented Northern Ireland, then later twice competed for England.

== Biography ==
Douglas finished on the podium on four occasions at the AAA Championships in 1997 2000, 2003 and 2006.

His personal best in the event is 48.54 seconds, set in 2003. As things stand it currently makes Douglas the 4th fastest Briton of all time over this distance at sea level.

At the 2000 Olympic Games in Sydney, he represented Great Britain in the 400 metres hurdles event and at the 2004 Olympic Games in Athens, he represented the Great Britain team again.

Douglas suffered from several injury problems towards the end of his career which forced him into early retirement. He has a degree in Sports Sciences from Brunel University London.

== Competition record ==
Year	Competition	Venue	Position	Event	Notes
Representing Great Britain and Northern Ireland
1995	European Junior Championships	Nyíregyháza, Hungary	3rd	400 m hurdles	51.73
1997	European U23 Championships	Turku, Finland	12th (h)	400 m hurdles	52.14
1998	Commonwealth Games	Kuala Lumpur, Malaysia	16th (h)	110 m hurdles	15.13
1998	Commonwealth Games	Kuala Lumpur, Malaysia	11th (h)	400 m hurdles	50.20
1998	Commonwealth Games	Kuala Lumpur, Malaysia	12th (h)	4 × 400 m relay	3:07.27
1999	Universiade	Palma de Mallorca, Spain	26th (h)	400 m hurdles	52.07
2000	Olympic Games	Sydney, Australia	19th (sf)	400 m hurdles	49.53
2001	Universiade	Beijing, China	16th (h)	400 m hurdles	50.59
Representing Great Britain and England
2002	Commonwealth Games	Manchester, United Kingdom	8th	400 m hurdles	49.38 SF
2003	Universiade	Daegu, South Korea	2nd	400 m hurdles	49.2648.54 SF
2004	Olympic Games	Athens, Greece	27th (h)	400 m hurdles	49.77
2006	Commonwealth Games	Melbourne, Australia	12th (sf)	400 m hurdles	50.56
2006	Commonwealth Games	Melbourne, Australia	2nd (h)	4 × 400 m relay	3:03.91
