= Aleksandr Derevyagin =

Russian hurdler

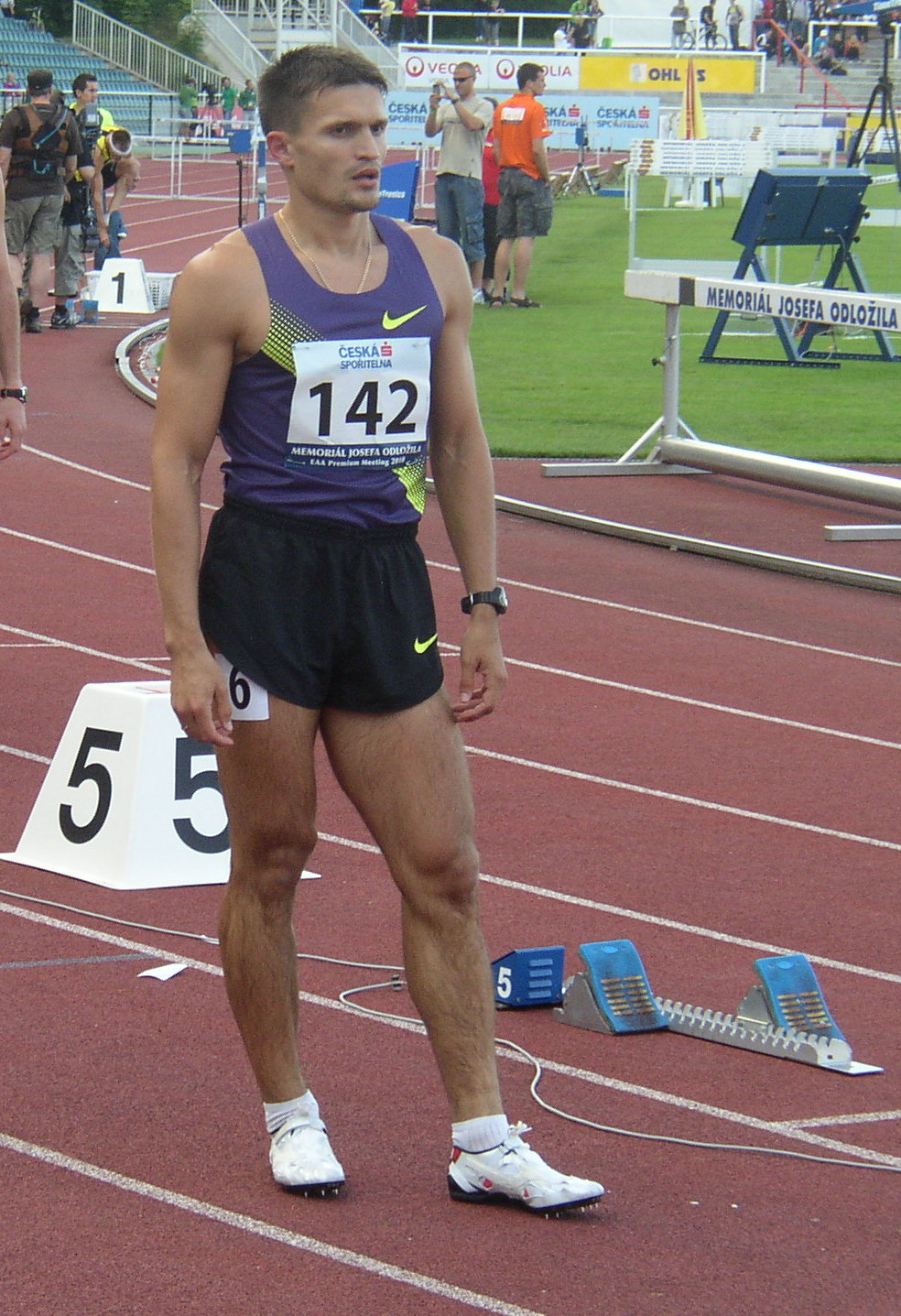
- Derevyagin at the 2010 Josef Odložil Memorial in Prague

Personal information
- Born: March 24, 1979 (age 47) Kemerovo, Soviet Union

Sport
- Sport: Track and field
Medal record
Representing Russia
World Indoor Championships
Bronze medal – third place	2006 Moscow	4x400m relay

Alexsandr Derevyagin (Russian: Александр Деревягин; born March 24, 1979) is a Russian hurdler.

He finished 8th in the 400m hurdles final at the 2006 European Athletics Championships in Gothenburg.

He also competed in the 4 × 400 m relay team for Russia at the 2006 IAAF World Indoor Championships, winning a bronze medal.

== Competition record ==
Year	Competition	Venue	Position	Event	Notes
Representing Russia
2003	Universiade	Daegu, South Korea	6th	400 m hurdles	50.01
2005	Universiade	İzmir, Turkey	4th	400 m hurdles	49.78
2006	World Indoor Championships	Moscow, Russia	3rd	4 × 400 m relay	3:06.91
2006	European Championships	Gothenburg, Sweden	8th	400 m hurdles	50.31
2007	World Championships	Osaka, Japan	11th (sf)	400 m hurdles	49.11
2008	Olympic Games	Beijing, China	11th (sf)	400 m hurdles	49.23
2009	World Championships	Berlin, Germany	21st (h)	400 m hurdles	49.83
2009	World Championships	Berlin, Germany	8th (h)	4 × 400 m relay	3:02.78
2010	European Championships	Barcelona, Spain	7th	400 m hurdles	49.70
2011	World Championships	Daegu, South Korea	8th	400 m hurdles	49.32
2012	European Championships	Helsinki, Finland	11th (sf)	400 m hurdles	50.02
