= James Carter (hurdler) =

American athlete (born 1978)

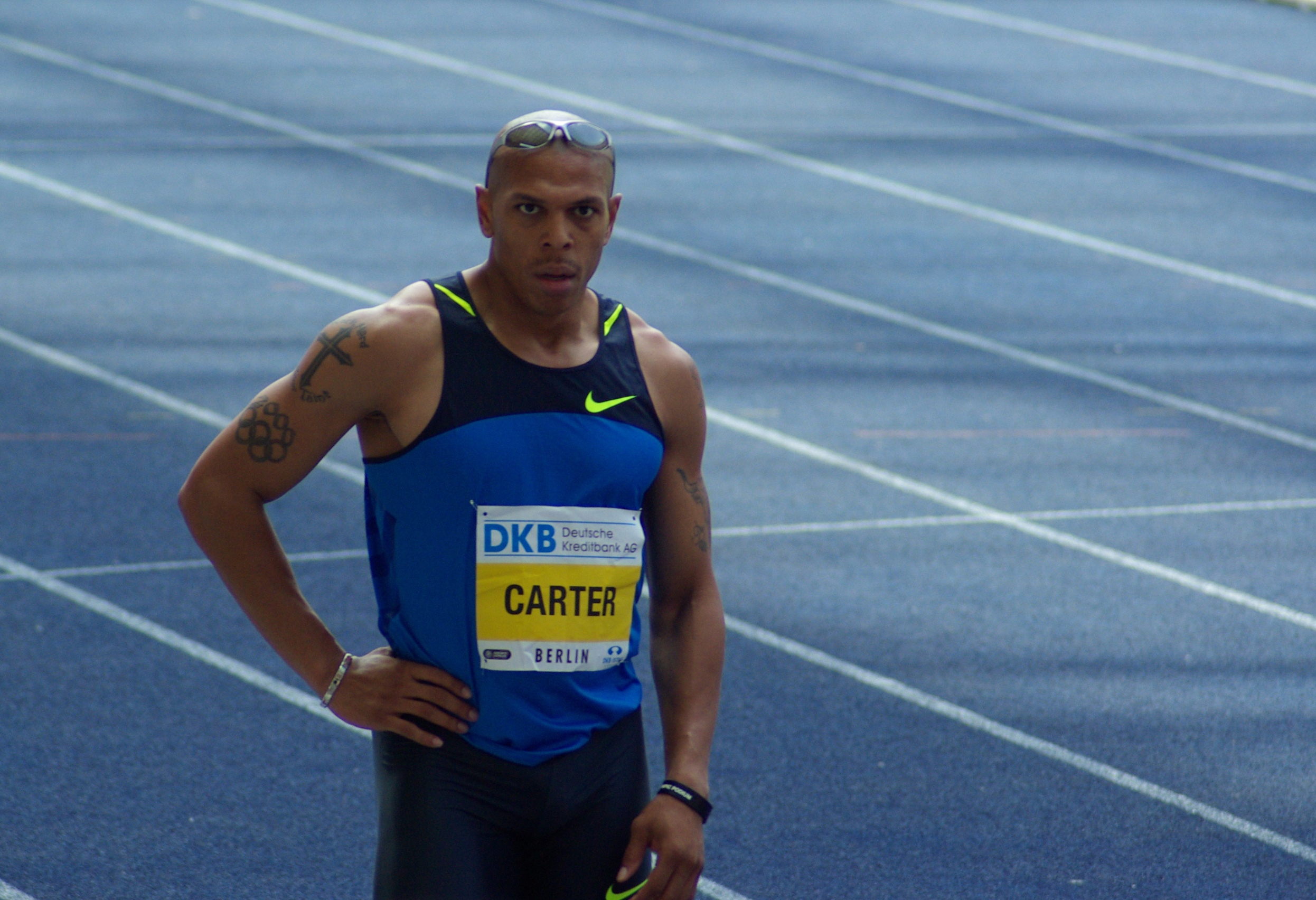
- Carter before race

Personal information
- Born: May 7, 1978 (age 48) Baltimore, Maryland, United States
- Height: 1.83 m (6 ft 0 in)
- Weight: 90 kg (198 lb)

Sport
- Sport: Athletics
- Event: 400 meter hurdles
- College team: Hampton University
- Club: Nike
Medal record
World Championships
Silver medal – second place	2005 Helsinki	400 m hurdles
IAAF World Cup
Gold medal – first place	2002 Madrid	400 m hurdles
NACAC Championships
Gold medal – first place	2002 San Antonio	4 x 400 m relay
Gold medal – first place	2002 San Antonio	400 m hurdles
USA Championships
Gold medal – first place	2007 Indianapolis	400 m hurdles
Bronze medal – third place	2006 Indianapolis	400 m hurdles
Bronze medal – third place	2005 Carson City	400 m hurdles
Gold medal – first place	2004 Sacramento	400 m hurdles
Bronze medal – third place	2003 Palo Alto	400 m hurdles
Gold medal – first place	2002 Palo Alto	400 m hurdles
Bronze medal – third place	2001 Eugene	400 m hurdles
Bronze medal – third place	2000 Sacramento	400 m hurdles
NCAA Championships
Bronze medal – third place	1999 Boise	400 m hurdles

James Carter (born May 7, 1978) is an American athlete who competed in the 400 m hurdles. His personal best of 47.43 was set when winning the silver medal at the 2005 World Championships. As of 2017, he is the 15th fastest-ever in the world and 9th fastest-ever in the USA. A 3-time United States champion (2002, 2004, 2007), he won the 2002 IAAF World Cup tile and finished fourth in the Olympic finals in 2000 and 2004.

== Early life ==
Born in Baltimore, Maryland, Carter grew up competing in track & field on the age group level. At the age of 12 he was diagnosed with a rare neuromuscular disease called Myasthenia Gravis which left him unable to run, walk and sometimes chew his food. He soon had surgery to have a tumor removed from his chest and was able to return to the sport of track and field. In high school he attended Mergenthaler Vocational-Technical High School (commonly referred to as Mervo) where he won multiple state championships while competing in sprints, hurdles, jumps and relays. He received All-Metro performer of the year honors and was named Gatorade athlete of the year in the state of Maryland his junior and senior years of high school. He went on to attend Hampton University where he became a 2 time national all-American in the 400 hurdles placing 7th at the NCAA national championships in 1998 and 3rd in 1999. He also currently holds the school indoor record in the Triple Jump and Mid-Eastern Athletic Conference records for most points scored in the conference meet. (38 points indoor and 39.5 outdoor)

== Personal life ==
Son of James Sr. and Marilyn Knight. Carter has two children; Daughter name Taleya and son name Tamere. Currently resides in New Jersey. He coaches in North Carolina, where he coaches and mentors young kids in the sport of track and field. He has helped numerous athletes become national All-Americans on the age group, high school and collegiate level.

== Achievements ==
- 2007 World Championships - fourth place
- 2007 USA Champion
- 2005 World Championships - silver medal
- 2004 IAAF World Athletics Final - second place
- 2004 Olympic Games - fourth place
- 2004 USA Champion
- 2002 IAAF World Cup- first place
- 2002 USA Champion
- 2002 IAAF Grand Prix Final - third place
- 2000 Olympic Games - fourth place

=== Personal bests ===
Event	Best	Location	Date
60 metres	6.74 (indoors)	Chapel Hill, NC	9 February 2007
200 metres	21.03 (indoors)	State College, PA	31 January 2004
200 metres	20.80	Baltimore, MD	17 April 1996
400 metres	46.36 (indoors)	Fayetteville, AR	10 February 2001
400 metres	46.21	Durham, NC	7 April 2001
400 metres hurdles	47.43	Helsinki, Finland	9 August 2005
800 metres	1:53.50	Gainesville, FL	28 March 2003
