= Meng Yan =

Chinese hurdler (born 1980)

Meng Yan (born 30 September 1980 in Jilin) is a Chinese track and field athlete who specialises in the 400 metre hurdles.

He won the silver medal at the 2006 Asian Games. He competed at the 2008 Olympic Games without reaching the final.

His personal best time is 49.03 seconds, achieved in May 2006 in Bangalore. This is the national record in the 400 m hurdles. He won the national championships in the event for a sixth time in 2009.
