= Athletics at the 2010 Commonwealth Games – Men's 400 metres hurdles =

Men's 400 metres hurdles at the Commonwealth Games

The Men's 400 metres hurdles at the 2010 Commonwealth Games as part of the athletics programme was held at the Jawaharlal Nehru Stadium on Saturday 9 October and Sunday 10 October 2010.

The top two runners in each of the initial three heats automatically alongside the two fasters runners qualified for the final.

== Records ==
| World Record | 46.78 | Kevin Young | United States | Barcelona, Spain | 6 August 1992 |
| Games Record | 48.05 | Louis van Zyl | RSA | Melbourne, Australia | 2006 |

== Round 1 ==
First 2 in each heat (Q) and 2 best performers (q) advance to the Final.

=== Heat 1 ===
| Rank | Lane | Name | Reaction Time | Result | Notes |
|---|---|---|---|---|---|
| 1 | 4 | Rhys Williams (WAL) | 0.209 | 49.81 | Q |
| 2 | 5 | Brendan Cole (AUS) | 0.209 | 49.96 | Q |
| 3 | 6 | David Hughes (ENG) | 0.180 | 50.55 | q |
| 4 | 3 | Mowen Boino (PNG) | 0.224 | 51.40 | SB |
| 5 | 7 | David Benjimin (VAN) | 0.220 | 54.64 | |
| 6 | 8 | Josef Robertson (JAM) | 0.162 | | DNF |

=== Heat 2 ===
| Rank | Lane | Name | Reaction Time | Result | Notes |
|---|---|---|---|---|---|
| 1 | 4 | David Greene (WAL) | 0.177 | 49.98 | Q |
| 2 | 6 | Vincent Koskei (KEN) | 0.222 | 50.11 | Q |
| 3 | 7 | Jean Vieillesse (MRI) | 0.230 | 51.21 | |
| 4 | 5 | Kuldev Singh (IND) | 0.208 | 51.59 | |
| 5 | 8 | Kurt Couto (MOZ) | 0.225 | 51.60 | |
| 6 | 3 | Amara Kamara (SLE) | 0.220 | 56.87 | PB |

=== Heat 3 ===
| Rank | Lane | Name | Reaction Time | Result | Notes |
|---|---|---|---|---|---|
| 1 | 5 | Richard Yates (ENG) | 0.233 | 49.83 | Q, SB |
| 2 | 7 | Louis van Zyl (RSA) | 0.207 | 49.95 | Q |
| 3 | 4 | Adrian Findlay (JAM) | 0.162 | 50.25 | q |
| 4 | 6 | Joseph Ganapathilacka (IND) | 0.182 | 50.55 | |
| 5 | 8 | Dale Garland (GUE) | 0.232 | 51.48 | |
| 6 | 3 | Wala Gime (PNG) | 0.208 | 56.61 | PB |

== Final ==
| Rank | Lane | Name | Reaction Time | Result | Notes |
|---|---|---|---|---|---|
| 1st place, gold medalist(s) | 6 | David Greene (WAL) | 0.163 | 48.52 | |
| 2nd place, silver medalist(s) | 7 | Louis van Zyl (RSA) | 0.201 | 48.63 | |
| 3rd place, bronze medalist(s) | 5 | Rhys Williams (WAL) | 0.214 | 49.19 | |
| 4 | 9 | Vincent Koskei (KEN) | 0.225 | 49.36 | PB |
| 5 | 4 | Richard Yates (ENG) | 0.225 | 49.84 | |
| 6 | 8 | Brendan Cole (AUS) | 0.221 | 50.14 | |
| 7 | 3 | Adrian Findlay (JAM) | 0.169 | 50.48 | |
| 8 | 2 | David Hughes (ENG) | 0.170 | 50.48 | |
