= Athletics at the 2007 All-Africa Games – Men's 400 metres hurdles =

The men's 400 metres hurdles at the 2007 All-Africa Games were held on July 20–21.

== Medalists ==
Gold	Silver	Bronze
LJ van Zyl; South Africa	Pieter de Villiers; South Africa	Alwyn Myburgh; South Africa

== Results ==
=== Heats ===
Qualification: First 3 of each heat (Q) and the next 2 fastest (q) qualified for the final.

Rank	Heat	Name	Nationality	Time	Notes
1	2	Pieter de Villiers	South Africa	49.43	Q
2	2	Julius Bungei	Kenya	49.48	Q
3	1	LJ van Zyl	South Africa	49.76	Q
4	1	Alwyn Myburgh	South Africa	49.76	Q
5	1	Kurt Couto	Mozambique	50.34	Q
6	2	Ibrahima Maïga	Mali	50.45	Q
7	2	El Hadj Seth Mbow	Senegal	50.62	q
8	2	O'Neil Wright	Liberia	50.80	q
9	2	Mohamed Hafid	Sudan	50.85	
10	1	Abderrahmane Hammadi	Algeria	50.86	
11	1	Chérif Issa Abdoulaye	Benin	51.25	
12	1	Mamadou Kasse Hanne	Senegal	51.26	
13	2	Antonio Vieillesse	Mauritius	51.40	
14	1	Mengaoni Zoheir	Libya	51.41	
15	2	Osita Okagu	Nigeria	51.55	
	1	Morufu Lawal	Nigeria	DNF	

=== Final ===
Rank	Name	Nationality	Time	Notes
1st place, gold medalist(s)	LJ van Zyl	South Africa	48.74	
2nd place, silver medalist(s)	Pieter de Villiers	South Africa	48.91	
3rd place, bronze medalist(s)	Alwyn Myburgh	South Africa	48.91	
4	Julius Bungei	Kenya	49.34	
5	Kurt Couto	Mozambique	50.19	
6	El Hadj Seth Mbow	Senegal	50.94	
7	O'Neil Wright	Liberia	52.56	
	Ibrahima Maïga	Mali	DNF	
