= Kerron Clement =

American track and field athlete

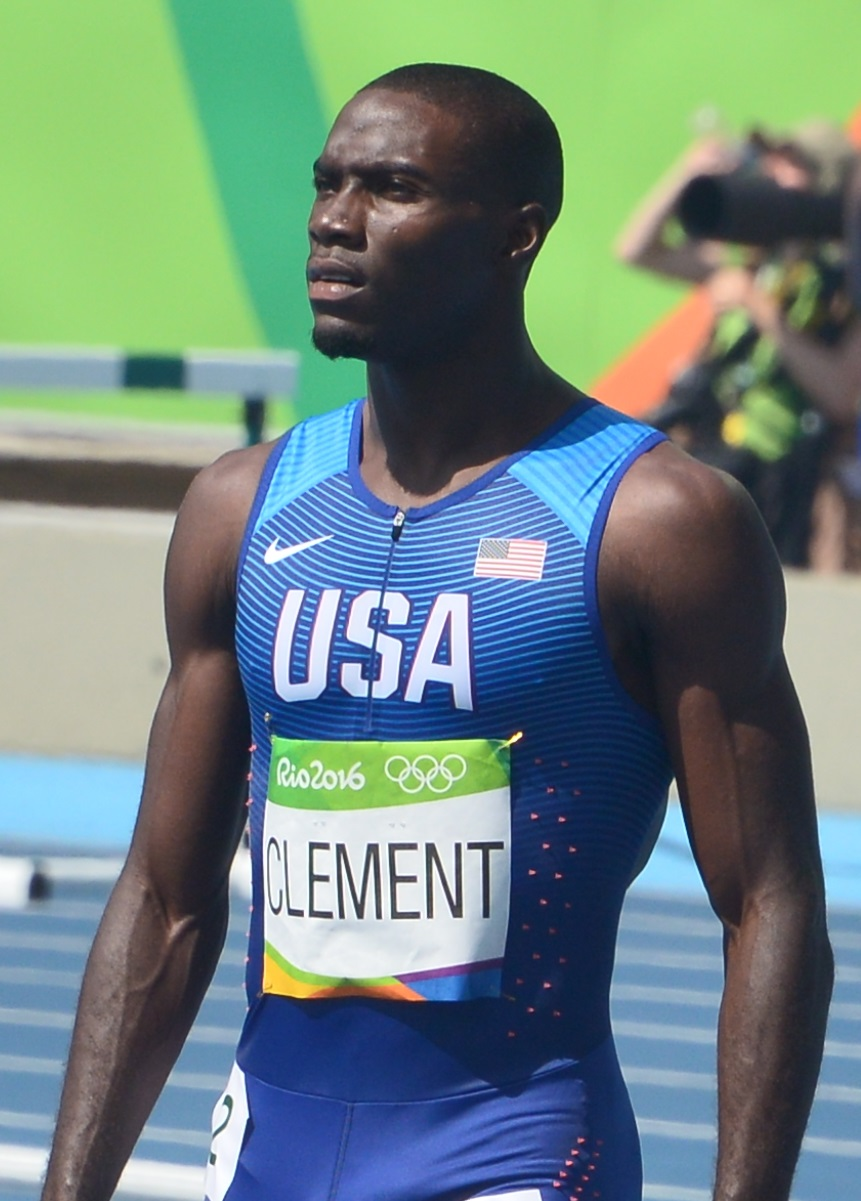
- Clement at the 2016 Summer Olympics

Personal information
- Full name: Kerron Stephon Clement
- Nationality: Trinidadian-American
- Born: October 31, 1985 (age 41) Port of Spain, Trinidad
- Height: 6 ft 2 in (188 cm)
- Weight: 185 lb (84 kg)

Sport
- Sport: Track and field
- Events: 400 meters, 400 meters hurdles
- College team: University of Florida
Medal record
Men's athletics
Representing the United States
Olympic Games
Gold medal – first place	2008 Beijing	4 × 400 m relay
Gold medal – first place	2016 Rio de Janeiro	400 m hurdles
Silver medal – second place	2008 Beijing	400 m hurdles
World Championships
Gold medal – first place	2007 Osaka	400 m hurdles
Gold medal – first place	2007 Osaka	4 × 400 m relay
Gold medal – first place	2009 Berlin	400 m hurdles
Gold medal – first place	2009 Berlin	4 × 400 m relay
Bronze medal – third place	2017 London	400 m hurdles
World Indoor Championships
Gold medal – first place	2010 Doha	4 × 400 m relay

Kerron Stephon Clement (born October 31, 1985) is a Trinidadian-born American track and field athlete who competes in the 400-meter hurdles and 400-meter sprint. He held the indoor world record in the 400-meter sprint, having broken Michael Johnson's mark in 2005.

Clement won the hurdles at the 2016 Summer Olympics in Rio de Janeiro and the 2007 and 2009 World Championships. He also took silver behind Angelo Taylor at the 2008 Beijing Olympics. He is a frequent member of the American 4 × 400-meter relay and is a two-time world champion and Olympic gold medalist in the event.

As a junior athlete, he set a championship record at the 2004 World Junior Championships and as a University of Florida Gator won back-to-back NCAA titles in 2004/2005. He quickly progressed on the senior circuit, taking the hurdles title at the USA Outdoor Track and Field Championships in both 2005 and 2006. He was fourth in his first global appearance at the 2005 World Championships and won his first global gold at the 2006 IAAF World Cup.

== Career ==
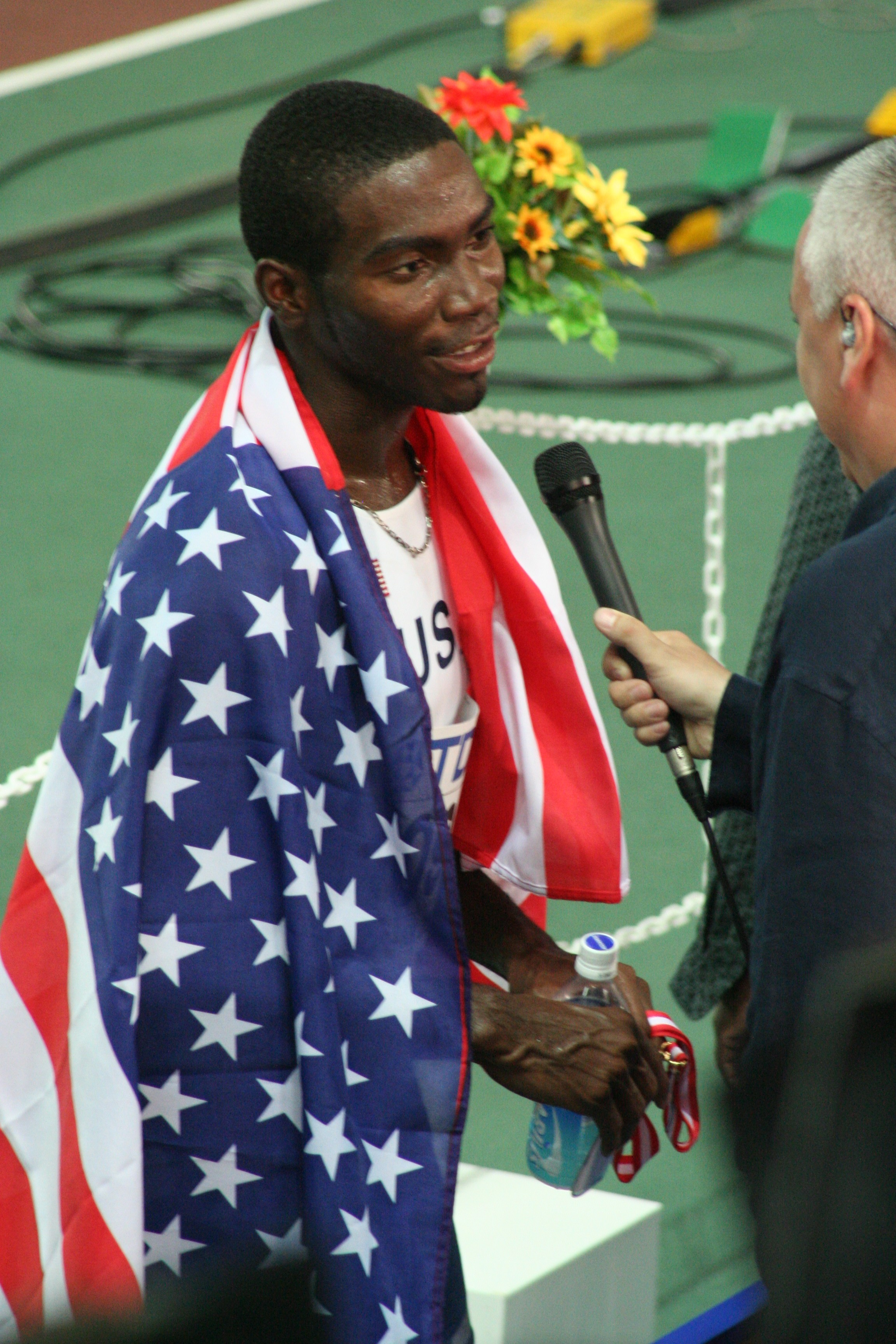
Clement at the 2007 World Championships

Clement was born in Port of Spain, Trinidad and Tobago. His family moved to the United States in 1998, where he became a successful high school athlete at La Porte High School in La Porte, Texas. He won both 110 and 400-meter hurdles at the USATF Youth Athletics Championships. He also won the (high school) National Scholastic Championship in the 110-meter high hurdles in 2002, and finished fifth in that same event his senior year in 2003. He won the 400-meter hurdles at the 2003 National Scholastic meet.

Clement accepted an athletic scholarship to attend the University of Florida in Gainesville, Florida, where he ran for coach Mike Holloway's Florida Gators track and field team in National Collegiate Athletic Association (NCAA) competition in 2004 and 2005. At the end of his freshman year in 2004, he won the NCAA outdoor championships in the 400-meter hurdles (a feat he would repeat in 2005). Clement became a U.S. citizen in June 2004 and was eligible to compete for a spot on the U.S. Olympic team, but instead opted to skip the Olympic Trials in favor of competing at the 2004 World Junior Championships in Athletics. At the World Junior Championships in July, he won the gold medal in the 400-meter hurdles in a championship record time of 48.51 seconds. Clement also ran a leg for the American 4 × 400-meter relay team and set a world junior record of 3:01.09.

On March 12, 2005, representing the University of Florida, he broke the indoor world record for the 400-meter sprint at the NCAA indoor championships in Randal Tyson Track Center in Fayetteville, Arkansas with a time of 44.57 seconds. His split at 200-meter was 21.08 seconds. The record was held for ten years previously by Michael Johnson at 44.63 seconds. Afterwards, Clement anchored Florida's 4 × 400-meter indoor relay to a time of 3:03.51.

Clement set a personal best and 2005 world leading performance in the 400-meter hurdles with a 47.24 seconds, winning the 2005 USA Outdoor Track and Field Championships title at Carson, California. This was the fastest time posted for the 400-meter hurdles in seven years. He opted to turn professional in the summer of 2005 and, while he no longer represented the University of Florida he continued to live and train in Gainesville. Clement faded during the 2005 World Championships in Athletics in Helsinki, Finland and missed out on the medals, finishing fourth. He represented the United States at the 2006 IAAF World Cup and won the hurdles title ahead of South African L. J. van Zyl.

Clement earned a gold medal in the 400-meter hurdles at the 2007 World Championship in Osaka. His time of 47.61 seconds was a season's best, and he was ranked the number 1 400-meter hurdler in the world. In the fall of 2007, he decided to leave Gainesville, and moved to California to train under legendary track coach Bob Kersee to prepare for the 2008 Olympics in Beijing.

Clement qualified in the 400-meter hurdles for the 2008 Summer Olympics on June 29, 2008, at the Olympic Trials in Eugene, Oregon. Clement advanced to the final where he was a slight favourite over compatriot Angelo Taylor, but Taylor ran a personal best time to win the gold medal. Clement came second for silver, and later won a gold medal in the 4 × 400-meter relay despite not racing in the final. He closed the year on the top of the podium with a gold medal at the 2008 IAAF World Athletics Final.

The following year he competed at the 2009 World Championships in Athletics. Reigning Olympic champion, Taylor, was eliminated in the heats. Clement won the gold medal in a season's best time of 47.91, beating Javier Culson and Bershawn Jackson to the title. He took another gold at the 2009 IAAF World Athletics Final, which was the last edition of the competition.

In 2011 he started off the outdoor season well, running a 48.74 on May 7, but he failed to improve on that time the rest of the year. As the two-time defending champion, Clement received an automatic entry to the 13th IAAF World Championships in Daegu, South Korea, but his time of 52.11 on 30 August was not good enough to advance to the finals.

Clement finished 3rd in the 400 metres hurdles in 48.44 at 2015 USA Outdoor Track and Field Championships to qualify for the 2015 World Championships in Athletics.

== Personal bests ==
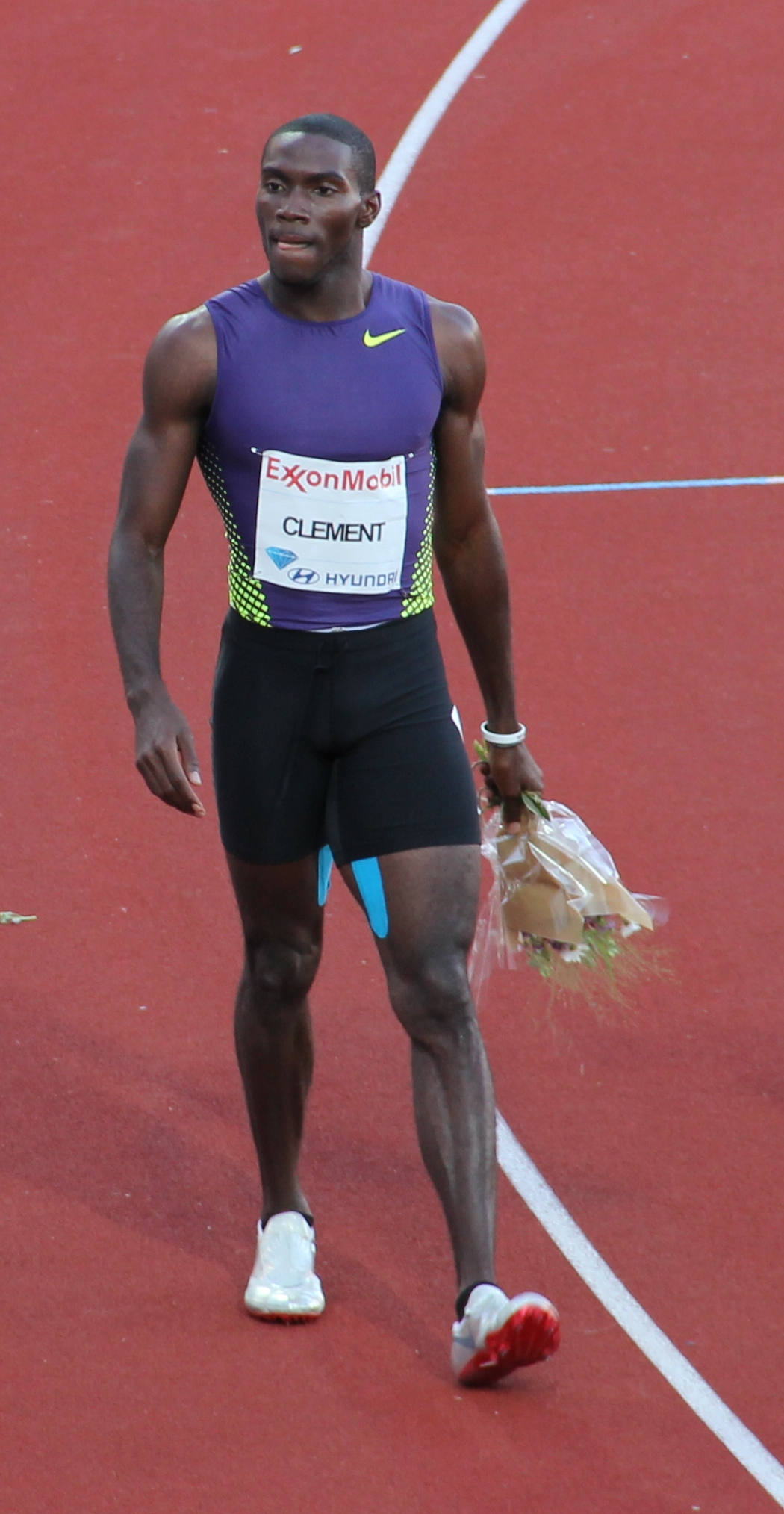
Clement at the 2010 Bislett Games

Event	Time (s)	Venue	Date
100 meters	10.23	Coral Gables, Florida	April 14, 2007
200 meters	20.49	Coral Gables, Florida	April 14, 2007
300 meters (indoor)	31.94	Fayetteville, Arkansas	June 26, 2005
400 meters	44.48	Stockholm, Sweden	August 7, 2007
55 meters hurdles (indoor)	7.28	Gainesville, Florida	January 15, 2005
60 meters hurdles (indoor)	7.80	Lexington, Kentucky	February 28, 2004
110 meters hurdles	13.77	Omaha, Nebraska	August 8, 2002
400 meters hurdles	47.24	Carson, California	June 26, 2005

- All information from IAAF profile. Last updated October 15, 2008

== Personal life ==
On October 11, 2019, during the annual National Coming Out Day (USA), Clement came out as gay during a Nike event, saying "It's who I am and it's what made me become the athlete I am today." He had struggled with his sexuality since his teens and decided it was time "to be free."

== See also ==
- Florida Gators
- List of Olympic medalists in athletics (men)
- List of University of Florida alumni
- List of University of Florida Olympians

Records
Preceded by Michael Johnson	Men's 400m Indoor World Record Holder; March 12, 2005– March 10, 2018	Succeeded by Michael Norman
Achievements
Preceded by Félix Sánchez	Men's 400 m Hurdles Best Year Performance; 2005 — 2007	Succeeded by Angelo Taylor
