= 2008 African Championships in Athletics – Men's 400 metres hurdles =

The men's 400 metres hurdles event at the 2008 African Championships in Athletics was held at the Addis Ababa Stadium on May 1–May 2.

== Medalists ==
Gold	Silver	Bronze
L.J. van Zyl; South Africa	Abderahmane Hamadi; Algeria	Ibrahim Maïga; Mali

== Results ==
=== Heats ===
Qualification: First 2 of each heat (Q) and the next 2 fastest (q) qualified for the final.

Rank	Heat	Name	Nationality	Time	Notes
1	3	L.J. van Zyl	South Africa	50.06	Q
2	2	Abderahmane Hamadi	Algeria	50.53	Q
3	2	Ockert Cilliers	South Africa	50.66	Q
4	2	Julius Bungei	Kenya	50.87	q
5	3	Wright O'Neil	Liberia	51.42	Q
6	2	El Hadj Seth Mbow	Senegal	51.70	q
7	1	Elamine Badr	Morocco	51.87	Q
8	1	Ibrahim Maïga	Mali	51.93	Q
9	3	Antonio Vieillesse	Mauritius	52.35	
10	1	Laroussi Titi	Tunisia	52.56	
11	3	Mamadou Kasse Hanne	Senegal	53.29	
12	3	Mohamed Hafid	Sudan	53.30	
13	1	Kurt Couto	Mozambique	53.84	
14	1	Abdulagadir Idriss	Sudan	53.84	
15	3	Osita Okagu	Nigeria	54.08	
16	2	Getachew Alemu	Ethiopia	55.37	
17	1	Houssein Nour Ali	Djibouti	55.41	
18	3	Worku Dibaba	Ethiopia	57.01	
19	2	Joseph Ndongo Abomo	Cameroon	57.18	
20	1	Feleke Degela	Ethiopia	58.10	
	2	Kayembe Ntumba	Democratic Republic of the Congo	DNS	

=== Final ===
Rank	Lane	Name	Nationality	Time	Notes
1st place, gold medalist(s)	6	L.J. van Zyl	South Africa	48.91	
2nd place, silver medalist(s)	5	Abderahmane Hamadi	Algeria	49.84	NR
3rd place, bronze medalist(s)	8	Ibrahim Maïga	Mali	49.84	
4	4	Ockert Cilliers	South Africa	49.93	
5	3	Elamine Badr	Morocco	50.57	
6	1	Julius Bungei	Kenya	51.03	
7	2	El Hadj Seth Mbow	Senegal	51.83	
8	7	Wright O'Neil	Liberia	52.68	
