= 2009 World Championships in Athletics – Men's 400 metres hurdles =

2009 Men's 400 metres championships

Men's 400 metres hurdles at the 2009 World Championships
- Venue: Olympic Stadium
- Dates: 15 August (heats); 16 August (semifinals); 18 August (final)
- Competitors: 32
- Winning time: 47.91

Medalists
gold medal	Kerron Clement; United States
silver medal	Javier Culson; Puerto Rico
bronze medal	Bershawn Jackson; United States

The men's 400 metres hurdles at the 2009 World Championships in Athletics was held at the Olympic Stadium on 15, 16 and 18 August.

The United States hurdling team was by far the strongest entered by any country, comprising defending champion Kerron Clement, two-time Olympic champion Angelo Taylor, 2005 World Champion Bershawn Jackson, and the emerging Johnny Dutch. The world-leading 400 m hurdler L.J. van Zyl, veterans Danny McFarlane and Félix Sánchez, and the improving Isa Phillips and Javier Culson were also identified as possible medal contenders.

In the heats, Briton Dai Greene completed an unexpected and comfortable win, while seventeen-year-old Jehue Gordon of Trinidad and Tobago surprised with a senior national record to qualify for the semis. In the semi-finals, van Zyl failed to qualify, following his pattern of poor performances at the biggest races of the season. Dutch and Phillips also failed to make the cut. Clement and Sánchez lead the way in the first semi, while Jackson and Greene (who set a personal best) took the top two spots in the other final.

In the final, Clement, Jackson and Culson all started the race well. However, it was the favourite, Clement, who took the gold medal: he was ahead at the final straight and did not relinquish his position, recording a world-leading time to win. Culson set a Puerto Rican record to take the silver, while Jackson fended off a challenge from national-record-breaking Gordon to keep third and win the bronze.

Although Clement's winning time was the second slowest in the history of the Championships, it remained a close race for the silver and bronze medals, with just 0.6 seconds between the silver medallist and seventh-placed Greene. The race had a breadth of ages, with Trinidadian Gordon becoming the youngest ever finalist of any men's sprint event at the Championships, and 37-year-old McFarlane being the oldest ever to do the same feat. Clement became the third man to win two consecutive world titles in the event, after Ed Moses and Félix Sánchez.

== Medalists ==
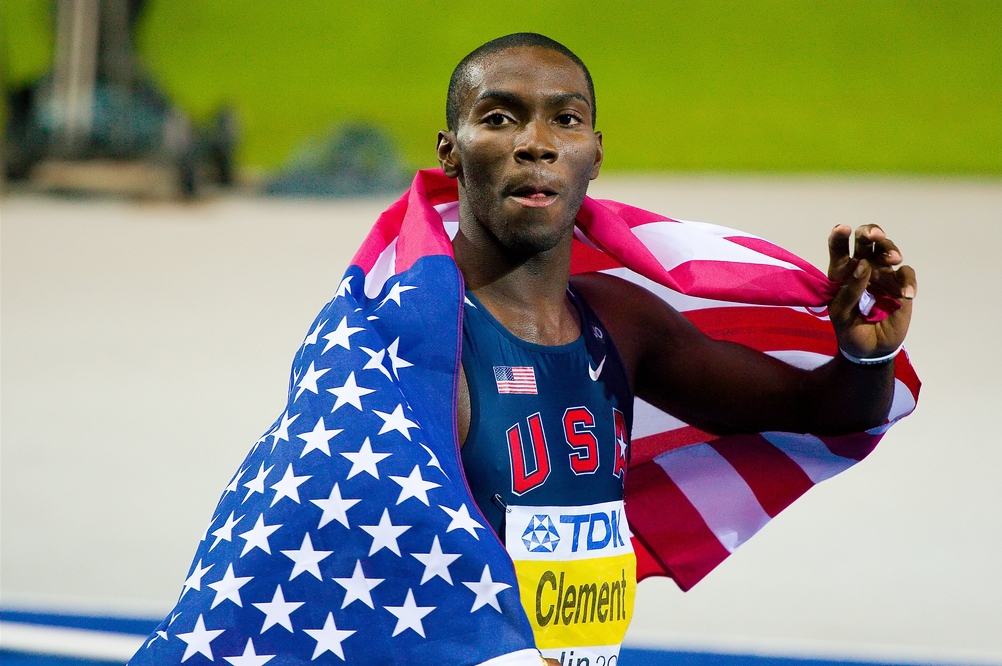
Kerron Clement retained his world title.

Gold	Silver	Bronze
Kerron Clement; United States	Javier Culson; Puerto Rico	Bershawn Jackson; United States

== Records ==
Prior to the competition, the following records were as follows.

World record	Kevin Young (USA)	46.78	Barcelona, Spain	6 August 1992
Championship record	Kevin Young (USA)	47.18	Stuttgart, Germany	19 August 1993
World leading	L. J. van Zyl (RSA)	47.94	Monaco	28 July 2009
African record	Samuel Matete (ZAM)	47.10	Zürich, Switzerland	7 August 1991
Asian record	Hadi Soua'an Al-Somaily (KSA)	47.53	Sydney, Australia	27 September 2000
North American record	Kevin Young (USA)	46.78	Barcelona, Spain	6 August 1992
South American record	Bayano Kamani (PAN)	47.84	Helsinki, Finland	7 August 2005
European record	Stéphane Diagana (FRA)	47.37	Lausanne, Switzerland	5 July 1995
Oceanian record	Rohan Robinson (AUS)	48.28	Atlanta, United States	31 July 1996

== Qualification standards ==
A time	B time
49.25	49.80

== Schedule ==
Date	Time	Round
August 15, 2009	20:20	Heats
August 16, 2009	20:15	Semifinals
August 18, 2009	20:50	Final

== Results ==
=== Heats ===
Qualification: First 3 in each heat(Q) and the next 4 fastest(q) advance to the semifinals.

Rank	Heat	Name	Nationality	Time	Notes
1	3	Kerron Clement	United States	48.39	Q
2	3	Danny McFarlane	Jamaica	48.65	Q
3	3	Jehue Gordon	Trinidad and Tobago	48.66	Q, NR
4	4	Dai Greene	Great Britain & N.I.	48.76	Q
5	3	Félix Sánchez	Dominican Republic	48.76	q, SB
6	1	Isa Phillips	Jamaica	48.99	Q
7	1	Periklis Iakovakis	Greece	49.12	Q, SB
8	2	Javier Culson	Puerto Rico	49.27	Q
9	3	Omar Cisneros	Cuba	49.27	q
10	2	Bershawn Jackson	United States	49.34	Q
11	1	Johnny Dutch	United States	49.38	Q
12	2	Kazuaki Yoshida	Japan	49.45	Q, PB
13	4	L. J. van Zyl	South Africa	49.48	Q
14	1	Andrés Silva	Uruguay	49.51	q, NR
15	2	Tristan Thomas	Australia	49.53	q
16	1	Kenji Narisako	Japan	49.60	
17	4	Brendan Cole	Australia	49.63	Q
18	4	Angelo Taylor	United States	49.64	
19	3	Michaël Bultheel	Belgium	49.67	PB
20	4	Fadil Bellaabouss	France	49.73	
21	4	Aleksandr Derevyagin	Russia	49.83	
22	2	Rhys Williams	Great Britain & N.I.	49.88	
23	1	Stanislav Melnykov	Ukraine	50.41	
24	1	Mahau Suguimati	Brazil	51.05	
25	1	Jussi Heikkilä	Finland	51.42	
26	2	Ibrahima Maïga	Mali	51.70	
27	3	Jonathan Williams	Belize	52.41	
	2	Josef Robertson	Jamaica	DQ	
	2	Héni Kechi	France	DQ	
	3	Joseph G. Abraham	India	DQ	
	4	Kurt Couto	Mozambique	DQ	
	4	Ali Obaid Shirook	United Arab Emirates	DNF	

Key: NR = National record, PB = Personal best, Q = qualification by place in heat, q = qualification by overall place, SB = Seasonal best

=== Semifinals ===
Qualification: First 3 in each semifinal(Q) and the next 2 fastest(q) advance to the final.

Rank	Heat	Name	Nationality	Time	Notes
1	1	Kerron Clement	United States	48.00	Q, SB
2	2	Bershawn Jackson	United States	48.23	Q
3	2	Dai Greene	Great Britain & N.I.	48.27	Q, PB
4	1	Félix Sánchez	Dominican Republic	48.34	Q, SB
5	1	Javier Culson	Puerto Rico	48.43	Q
6	1	Danny McFarlane	Jamaica	48.49	q
7	2	Periklis Iakovakis	Greece	48.73	Q, SB
8	1	Jehue Gordon	Trinidad and Tobago	48.77	q
9	1	L. J. van Zyl	South Africa	48.80	
10	2	Isa Phillips	Jamaica	48.93	
11	2	Omar Cisneros	Cuba	49.21	
12	2	Johnny Dutch	United States	49.28	
13	1	Andrés Silva	Uruguay	49.34	NR
14	2	Tristan Thomas	Australia	49.76	
15	1	Brendan Cole	Australia	49.92	
16	2	Kazuaki Yoshida	Japan	50.34	

Key: NR = National record, PB = Personal best, Q = qualification by place in heat, q = qualification by overall place, SB = Seasonal best

=== Final ===
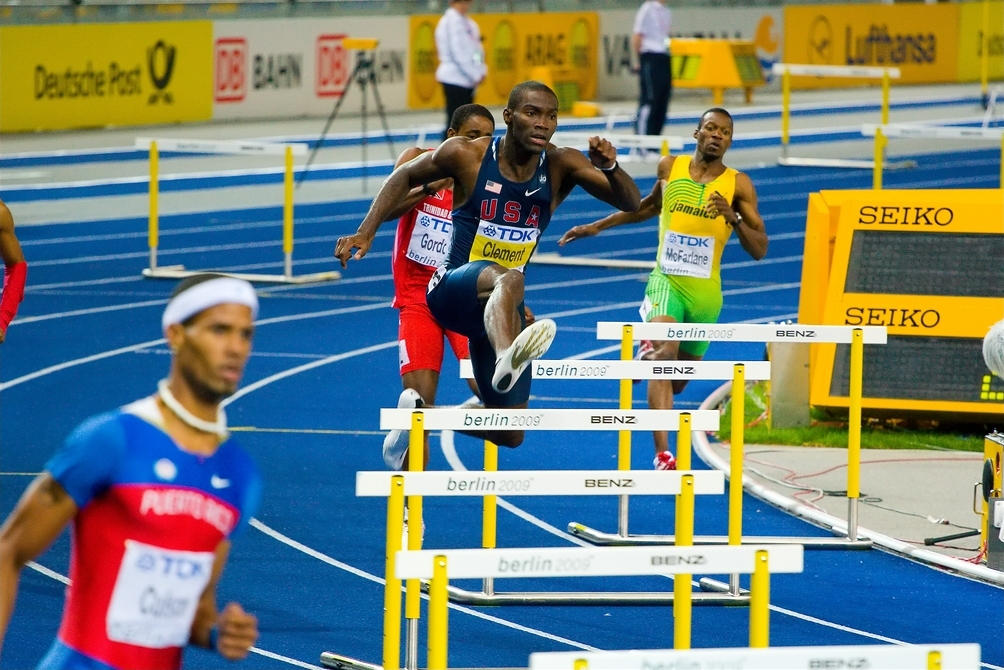
Clement beat Javier Culson to the gold.

Rank	Name	Nationality	Time	Notes
1st place, gold medalist(s)	Kerron Clement	United States	47.91	WL
2nd place, silver medalist(s)	Javier Culson	Puerto Rico	48.09	NR
3rd place, bronze medalist(s)	Bershawn Jackson	United States	48.23	
4	Jehue Gordon	Trinidad and Tobago	48.26	NR
5	Periklis Iakovakis	Greece	48.42	SB
6	Danny McFarlane	Jamaica	48.65	
7	Dai Greene	Great Britain & N.I.	48.68	
8	Félix Sánchez	Dominican Republic	50.11	

Key: NR = National record, SB = Seasonal best, WL = World leading (in a given season)
