= 2006 African Championships in Athletics – Men's 400 metres hurdles =

The men's 400 metres hurdles event at the 2006 African Championships in Athletics was held at the Stade Germain Comarmond on August 9–10.

== Medalists ==
Gold	Silver	Bronze
L.J. van Zyl; South Africa	Alwyn Myburgh; South Africa	Kurt Couto; Mozambique

== Results ==
=== Heats ===
Rank	Heat	Name	Nationality	Time	Notes
1	1	Alwyn Myburgh	South Africa	50.39	Q
2	2	L.J. van Zyl	South Africa	50.40	Q
3	2	Pieter de Villiers	South Africa	50.49	Q
4	1	Ibrahima Maïga	Mali	50.71	Q
5	1	Kurt Couto	Mozambique	51.00	Q
6	1	Julius Bungei	Kenya	51.37	q
7	2	O'Neil Wright	Liberia	51.89	Q
8	1	El Hadj Seth Mbow	Senegal	51.96	q
9	2	Dan Kirwa Katonon	Kenya	52.25	
10	1	Abdoulaye Issa Cherif	Benin	52.36	
11	2	Antonio Veillesse	Mauritius	53.22	
12	1	Lensley Juhel	Mauritius	53.46	
13	2	Osita Okagu	Nigeria	53.99	
14	2	Mamadou Kasse Hanne	Senegal	54.47	

=== Final ===
Rank	Lane	Name	Nationality	Time	Notes
1st place, gold medalist(s)	4	L.J. van Zyl	South Africa	49.43	
2nd place, silver medalist(s)	5	Alwyn Myburgh	South Africa	49.88	
3rd place, bronze medalist(s)	2	Kurt Couto	Mozambique	50.72	
4	6	Pieter de Villiers	South Africa	50.96	
5	3	Ibrahima Maïga	Mali	51.51	
6	7	Julius Bungei	Kenya	51.54	
7	8	O'Neil Wright	Liberia	52.10	
8	1	El Hadj Seth Mbow	Senegal	53.00	
