= 2010 African Championships in Athletics – Men's 400 metres hurdles =

The men's 400 metres hurdles at the 2010 African Championships in Athletics were held on July 29–30.

== Medalists ==
Gold	Silver	Bronze
L.J. van Zyl; South Africa	Cornel Fredericks; South Africa	Mamadou Kasse Hanne; Senegal

== Results ==
=== Heats ===
Qualification: First 3 of each heat (Q) and the next 2 fastest (q) qualified for the final.

Rank	Heat	Name	Nationality	Time	Notes
1	1	Mamadou Kasse Hanne	Senegal	49.45	Q
2	2	L.J. van Zyl	South Africa	49.73	Q
3	1	Cornel Fredericks	South Africa	49.82	Q
4	2	Vincent Kiplangat Koskei	Kenya	49.99	Q
5	1	Mohamed Seghaier	Tunisia	50.28	Q, PB
6	2	Kurt Couto	Mozambique	50.62	Q
7	2	Hafz Hussein	Sudan	51.21	q
8	1	Antonio Vieillesse	Mauritius	51.35	q
9	2	Hamza Deyaf	Libya	51.50	
10	1	Kiprono Koskei	Kenya	51.85	
11	1	Boniface Mucheru Tumuti	Kenya	51.94	
12	1	Bernabe Bationo	Burkina Faso	51.99	
13	2	Daniel Lagamang	Botswana	52.36	NR
14	2	Valery Komenan	Ivory Coast	52.82	
15	1	Julien Gaudefroy Diamond	Ivory Coast	53.71	
16	2	Zelalem Chimdessa	Ethiopia	57.51	

=== Final ===
Rank	Lane	Name	Nationality	Time	Notes
1st place, gold medalist(s)	5	L.J. van Zyl	South Africa	48.51	SB
2nd place, silver medalist(s)	6	Cornel Fredericks	South Africa	48.79	SB
3rd place, bronze medalist(s)	4	Mamadou Kasse Hanne	Senegal	49.10	SB
4	3	Vincent Kiplangat Koskei	Kenya	49.70	SB
5	7	Kurt Couto	Mozambique	49.79	
6	8	Mohamed Seghaier	Tunisia	50.05	PB
7	2	Antonio Vieillesse	Mauritius	51.08	
8	1	Hafz Hussein	Sudan	52.02	
