= 2002 World Junior Championships in Athletics – Men's 400 metres hurdles =

The men's 400 metres hurdles event at the 2002 World Junior Championships in Athletics was held in Kingston, Jamaica, at National Stadium on 16, 17 and 19 July.

== Medalists ==
Gold	Louis van Zyl; South Africa
Silver	Kenneth Ferguson; United States
Bronze	Bershawn Jackson; United States

== Results ==
=== Final ===
19 July

Rank	Name	Nationality	Time	Notes
1st place, gold medalist(s)	Louis van Zyl	South Africa	48.89	
2nd place, silver medalist(s)	Kenneth Ferguson	United States	49.38	
3rd place, bronze medalist(s)	Bershawn Jackson	United States	50.00	
4	Steven Green	United Kingdom	51.14	
5	Greg Little	Jamaica	51.23	
6	Jussi Heikkilä	Finland	51.35	
7	Julius Bungei	Kenya	51.40	
8	Zhang Shibao	China	51.42	

=== Semifinals ===
17 July

==== Semifinal 1 ====
Rank	Name	Nationality	Time	Notes
1	Bershawn Jackson	United States	50.77	Q
2	Steven Green	United Kingdom	51.12	Q
3	Jussi Heikkilä	Finland	51.35	q
4	Jun Hamada	Japan	52.28	
5	Andrey Kozlovskiy	Belarus	52.47	
6	Ouadih Naciri	Morocco	52.73	
7	Ibrahim Al-Hamaidi	Saudi Arabia	53.23	
8	Lars-Birger Hense	Germany	53.28	

==== Semifinal 2 ====
Rank	Name	Nationality	Time	Notes
1	Louis van Zyl	South Africa	51.05	Q
2	Greg Little	Jamaica	51.63	Q
3	Rhys Williams	United Kingdom	51.68	
4	Mohamed Atig	France	52.30	
5	Marcin Joachimiak	Poland	52.57	
6	Daniel Kibet	Kenya	52.84	
7	Idris Al-Housaoui	Saudi Arabia	52.91	
8	Elliott Wood	Australia	53.24	

==== Semifinal 3 ====
Rank	Name	Nationality	Time	Notes
1	Kenneth Ferguson	United States	50.90	Q
2	Julius Bungei	Kenya	51.10	Q
3	Zhang Shibao	China	51.23	q
4	Tobby Sutherland	Australia	51.78	
5	David Busch	Germany	53.13	
6	Mihaíl Markopóulos	Greece	54.41	
7	Levis Ouédraogo	Burkina Faso	55.73	
	Ákos Dezsö	Hungary	DNF	

=== Heats ===
16 July

==== Heat 1 ====
Rank	Name	Nationality	Time	Notes
1	Bershawn Jackson	United States	51.29	Q
2	Tobby Sutherland	Australia	51.59	Q
3	Ákos Dezsö	Hungary	51.82	Q
4	Mohamed Atig	France	52.38	Q
5	Kenji Narisako	Japan	54.10	
6	Patlavath Shankar	India	55.66	
7	Ko Wen-Bin	Chinese Taipei	56.93	

==== Heat 2 ====
Rank	Name	Nationality	Time	Notes
1	Marcin Joachimiak	Poland	52.31	Q
2	Andrey Kozlovskiy	Belarus	52.43	Q
3	Ouadih Naciri	Morocco	52.45	Q
4	Zhang Shibao	China	52.49	Q
5	Guillaume Favier	France	53.00	
6	Shane Charles	Grenada	53.49	
7	Kamal Ben Saad	Algeria	55.18	

==== Heat 3 ====
Rank	Name	Nationality	Time	Notes
1	Kenneth Ferguson	United States	50.38	Q
2	Greg Little	Jamaica	51.74	Q
3	David Busch	Germany	52.18	Q
4	Daniel Kibet	Kenya	52.58	Q
5	Idris Al-Housaoui	Saudi Arabia	52.65	q
6	Jun Hamada	Japan	52.81	q
7	Björgvin Víkingsson	Iceland	53.39	
8	Constantinos Constantinou	Cyprus	54.50	

==== Heat 4 ====
Rank	Name	Nationality	Time	Notes
1	Louis van Zyl	South Africa	50.60	Q
2	Julius Bungei	Kenya	50.90	Q
3	Rhys Williams	United Kingdom	51.71	Q
4	Mihaíl Markopóulos	Greece	53.46	Q
5	Kurt Couto	Mozambique	53.51	
6	Patrick Lee	Jamaica	54.48	

==== Heat 5 ====
Rank	Name	Nationality	Time	Notes
1	Steven Green	United Kingdom	51.68	Q
2	Jussi Heikkilä	Finland	51.96	Q
3	Elliott Wood	Australia	52.16	Q
4	Lars-Birger Hense	Germany	52.24	Q
5	Ibrahim Al-Hamaidi	Saudi Arabia	52.61	q
6	Levis Ouédraogo	Burkina Faso	52.97	q
7	Roberto García	Mexico	52.97	
8	Aleksey Pogorelov	Kyrgyzstan	53.48	

== Participation ==
According to an unofficial count, 36 athletes from 27 countries participated in the event.

- Algeria (1)
- Australia (2)
- Belarus (1)
- Burkina Faso (1)
- China (1)
- Chinese Taipei (1)
- Cyprus (1)
- Finland (1)
- France (2)
- Germany (2)
- Greece (1)
- Grenada (1)
- Hungary (1)
- Iceland (1)
- India (1)
- Jamaica (2)
- Japan (2)
- Kenya (2)
- Kyrgyzstan (1)
- Mexico (1)
- Morocco (1)
- Mozambique (1)
- Poland (1)
- Saudi Arabia (2)
- South Africa (1)
- United Kingdom (2)
- United States (2)
