= Athletics at the 2006 Commonwealth Games – Men's 400 metres hurdles =

Men's 400 metres hurdles at the Commonwealth Games

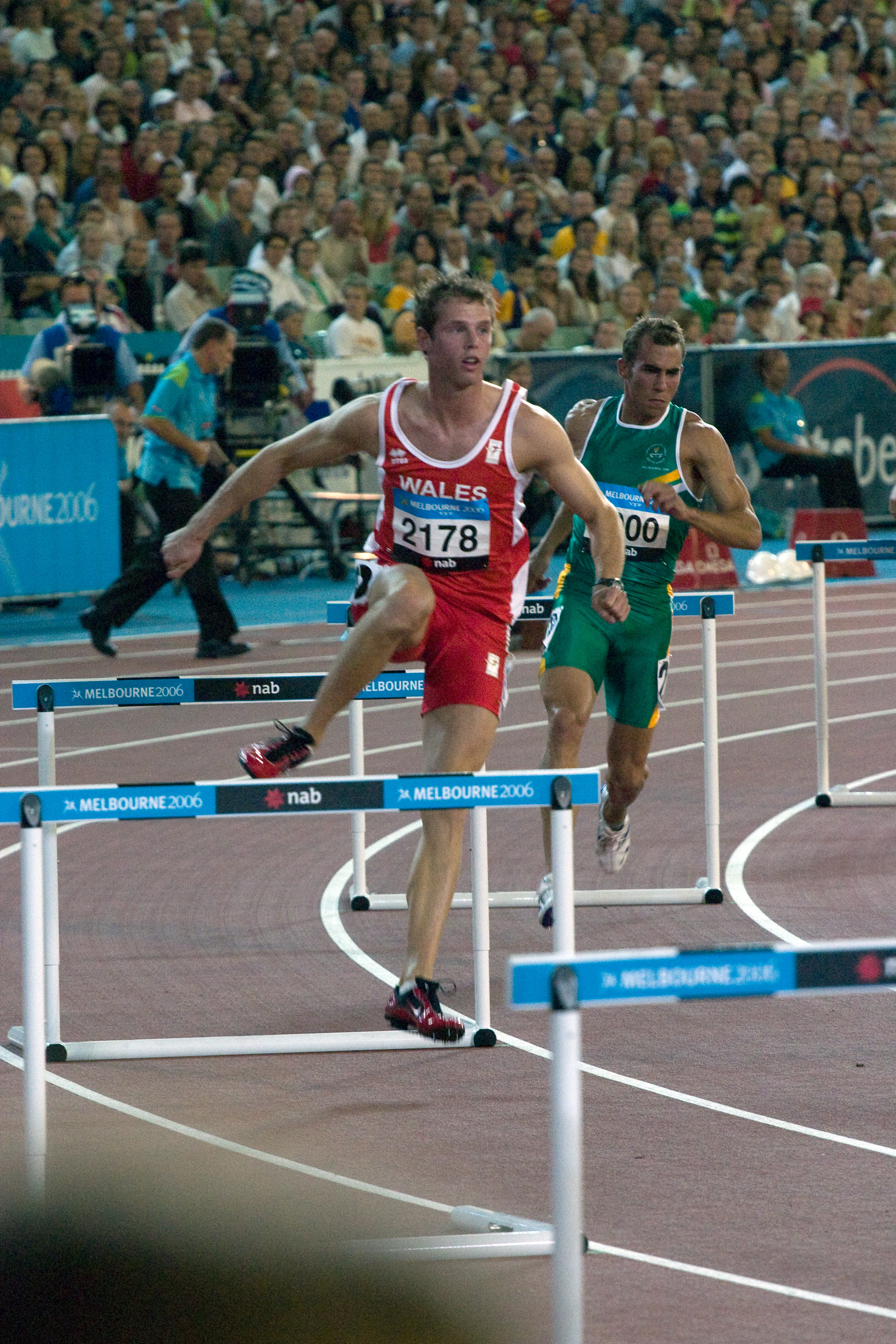
Rhys Williams (left) and Pieter de Villiers (right) during the 400 metres hurdles final

The men's 400 metres hurdles event at the 2006 Commonwealth Games was held on March 21–23.

== Medalists ==
Gold	Silver	Bronze
LJ van Zyl; South Africa	Alwyn Myburgh; South Africa	Kemel Thompson; Jamaica

== Results ==
=== Heats ===
Qualification: First 3 of each heat (Q) and the next 4 fastest (q) qualified for the semifinals.

Rank	Heat	Name	Nationality	Time	Notes
1	1	Alwyn Myburgh	South Africa	49.34	Q
2	2	Rhys Williams	Wales	49.52	Q, PB
3	2	Chris Rawlinson	England	49.67	Q
4	1	Dean Griffiths	Jamaica	49.69	Q
5	2	LJ van Zyl	South Africa	49.70	Q
6	3	Matt Elias	Wales	49.77	Q
7	3	Brendan Cole	Australia	49.85	Q
8	1	Tristan Thomas	Australia	49.88	Q, PB
9	4	Kemel Thompson	Jamaica	49.89	Q
10	4	Pieter de Villiers	South Africa	50.07	Q
11	3	Mowen Boino	Papua New Guinea	50.37	Q, NR
12	3	Ian Weakley	Jamaica	50.50	q
13	4	Matthew Douglas	England	50.71	Q
14	1	Antonio Veillesse	Mauritius	51.88	q
14	4	Kurt Couto	Mozambique	51.88	q
16	2	Douglas Lynes	Bahamas	52.06	q
17	4	Vincent Kiilu	Kenya	52.40	
18	4	Lensley Juhel	Mauritius	52.48	
19	3	Dan Kirwa Katonon	Kenya	52.69	
20	1	Ednal Rolle	Bahamas	52.87	
21	1	Aleki Sapoi	Tonga	54.15	
22	2	Elliot Wood	Australia	54.55	

=== Semifinals ===
Qualification: First 4 of each semifinal (Q) qualified directly for the final.

Rank	Heat	Name	Nationality	Time	Notes
1	2	Kemel Thompson	Jamaica	48.71	Q
2	1	Alwyn Myburgh	South Africa	49.04	Q
3	2	LJ van Zyl	South Africa	49.08	Q
4	1	Rhys Williams	Wales	49.17	Q, PB
5	1	Chris Rawlinson	England	49.21	Q, SB
6	2	Pieter de Villiers	South Africa	49.32	Q
7	2	Brendan Cole	Australia	49.36	Q, PB
8	2	Ian Weakley	Jamaica	49.83	
9	2	Matt Elias	Wales	49.89	
10	1	Dean Griffiths	Jamaica	49.98	Q
11	1	Tristan Thomas	Australia	50.56	
12	2	Matthew Douglas	England	50.56	
13	1	Mowen Boino	Papua New Guinea	50.78	
14	1	Antonio Veillesse	Mauritius	51.43	PB
15	1	Kurt Couto	Mozambique	52.16	
16	2	Douglas Lynes	Bahamas	53.06	

=== Final ===
Rank	Lane	Name	Nationality	Time	Notes
1st place, gold medalist(s)	6	LJ van Zyl	South Africa	48.05	GR
2nd place, silver medalist(s)	4	Alwyn Myburgh	South Africa	48.23	SB
3rd place, bronze medalist(s)	5	Kemel Thompson	Jamaica	48.65	
4	3	Rhys Williams	Wales	49.09	PB
5	8	Brendan Cole	Australia	49.41	
6	7	Dean Griffiths	Jamaica	49.85	
7	2	Pieter de Villiers	South Africa	50.51	
8	1	Chris Rawlinson	England	52.89	

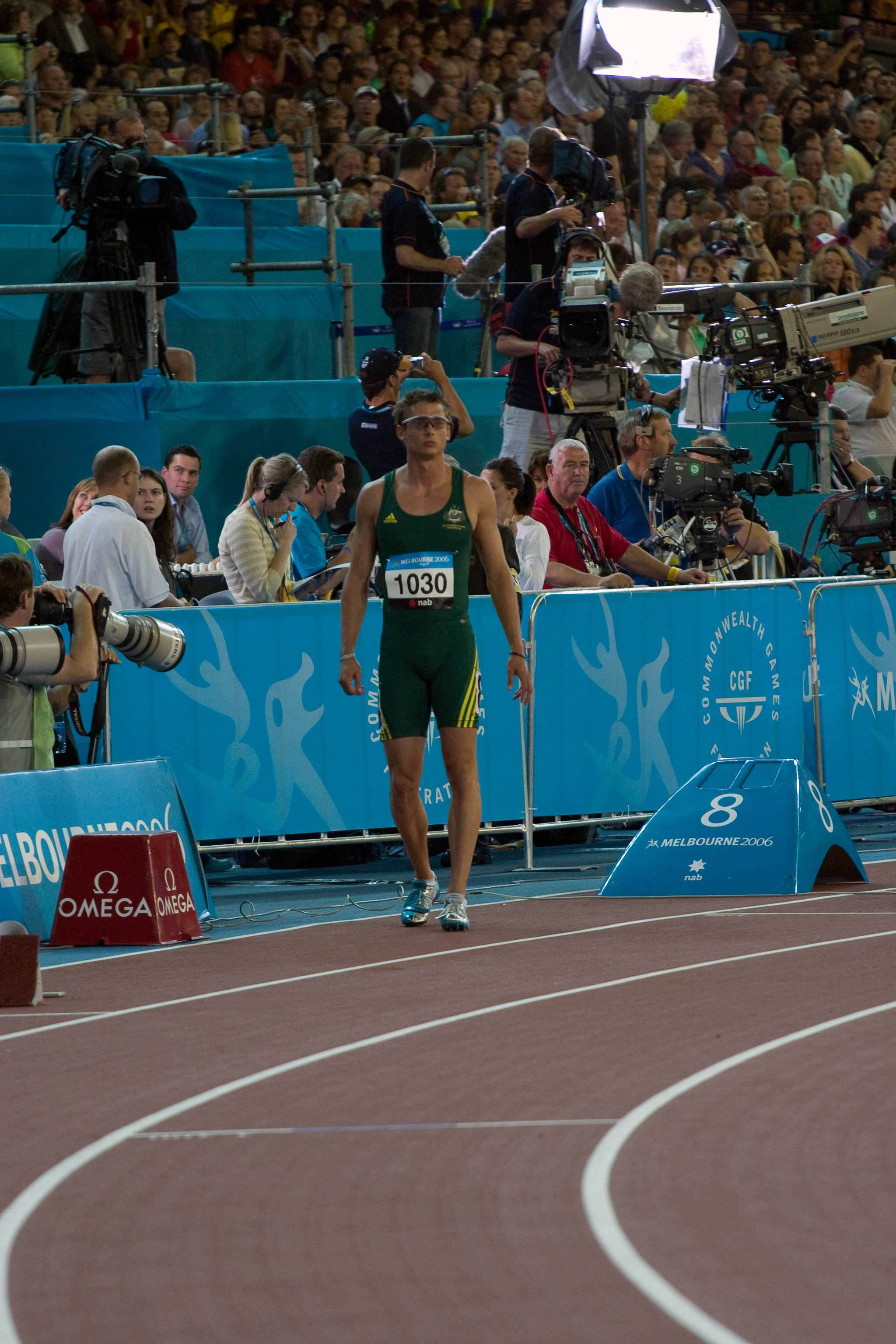
Australian Brendan Cole before the start of the final
