= Athletics at the 2003 All-Africa Games – Men's 400 metres hurdles =

The men's 400 metres hurdles at the 2003 All-Africa Games were held on October 13–14.

== Medalists ==
Gold	Silver	Bronze
Osita Okagu; Nigeria	Victor Okorie; Nigeria	Ibou Faye; Senegal

== Results ==
=== Heats ===
Qualification: First 3 of each heat (Q) and the next 2 fastest (q) qualified for the semifinal.

Wind:
Heat 1: -0.2 m/s, Heat 2: -0.2 m/s

Rank	Heat	Name	Nationality	Time	Notes
1	1	Victor Okorie	Nigeria	51.78	Q
2	1	Oumar Diarra	Mali	52.22	Q
3	2	Osita Okagu	Nigeria	52.32	Q
4	1	Lensley Juhel	Mauritius	52.44	Q
5	2	Ibou Faye	Senegal	52.61	Q
6	1	Ibrahim Tondi	Niger	53.01	q
7	2	Abdoulaye Issa Chérif	Benin	53.09	Q
8	2	Sunday Adeleye	Nigeria	53.13	q
9	1	Arlindo Leocadio Pinheiro	São Tomé and Príncipe	54.04	
10	1	Obang Obaia	Ethiopia	54.94	
	2	Levy Ouédraogo	Burkina Faso	DNF	
	1	Lucien Panjikola	Central African Republic	DNS	
	2	Ibrahima Maïga	Mali	DNS	

=== Final ===
Rank	Name	Nationality	Time	Notes
1st place, gold medalist(s)	Osita Okagu	Nigeria	50.25	
2nd place, silver medalist(s)	Victor Okorie	Nigeria	50.36	
3rd place, bronze medalist(s)	Ibou Faye	Senegal	50.89	
4	Oumar Diarra	Mali	51.97	
5	Lensley Juhel	Mauritius	52.04	
6	Sunday Adeleye	Nigeria	52.26	
7	Abdoulaye Issa Chérif	Benin	52.69	
8	Ibrahim Tondi	Niger	53.39	
