= Athletics at the 2007 All-Africa Games – Men's 4 × 400 metres relay =

The men's 4 × 400 metres relay at the 2007 All-Africa Games was held on July 21–22.

== Medalists ==
Gold	Silver	Bronze
Botswana; Gakologelwang Masheto; Obakeng Ngwigwa; Isaac Makwala; California Molefe	Nigeria; Bola Lawal; Saul Weigopwa; Victor Isaiah; James Godday	Zimbabwe; Nelton Ndebele; Talkmore Nyongani; Gabriel Chikomo; Lewis Banda

== Results ==
=== Heats ===
Qualification: First 3 teams of each heat (Q) plus the next 2 fastest (q) qualified for the final.

Rank	Heat	Nation	Athletes	Time	Notes
1	2	Zimbabwe	Nelton Ndebele, Talkmore Nyongani, Gabriel Chikomo, Lewis Banda	3:06.17	Q
2	2	Senegal	Mamadou Gueye, Abdoulaye Wagne, Mamadou Kassé Hanne, El Hadj Seth Mbow	3:06.65	Q
3	2	Algeria	Fayçal Cherifi, Nabil Madi, Malik Louahla, Miloud Rahmani	3:06.67	Q
4	2	Sudan	Nagmeldin Ali Abubakr, William Filip, Mohamed Hafid, Abubaker Kaki	3:07.63	q
5	1	Kenya	George Kwoba, Vincent Mumo, Ezra Sambu, Thomas Musembi	3:08.01	Q
6	2	Nigeria	Bola Lawal, Saul Weigopwa, Victor Isaiah, James Godday	3:08.11	q
7	1	South Africa	LJ van Zyl, Pieter De Villiers, Paul Gorries, Alwyn Myburgh	3:08.18	Q
8	1	Botswana	Obakeng Ngwigwa, Isaac Makwala, Tshepo Kelgotswe, Zacharia Kamberuka	3:08.26	Q
9	2	Mauritius	Jean François Degrace, Ommanandsing Kowlessur, Antonio Vieillesse, Fernando Augustin	3:08.26	
10	2	Benin	Narcisse Tevoedjre, Cherif Abdoulaye, Blaise de Campos, Mathieu Gnanligo	3:12.03	
11	1	Gambia	Momodou Lamin Kujabi, Ismaïla Manga, Bakary Jabbie, Ebrima Ceesay	3:13.21	
12	1	Chad	Ahmat Ousmane, Abdallah Al Beine, Moussa Mahamat Issa, Brahim Ouaddai	3:24.19	
	1	Libya		DNS	

=== Final ===
Rank	Nation	Athletes	Time	Notes
1st place, gold medalist(s)	Botswana	Gakologelwang Masheto, Obakeng Ngwigwa, Isaac Makwala, California Molefe	3:03.16	
2nd place, silver medalist(s)	Nigeria	Bola Lawal, Saul Weigopwa, Victor Isaiah, James Godday	3:03.99	
3rd place, bronze medalist(s)	Zimbabwe	Nelton Ndebele, Talkmore Nyongani, Gabriel Chikomo, Lewis Banda	3:04.84	
4	Algeria	Fayçal Cherifi, Nabil Madi, Malik Louahla, Miloud Rahmani	3:05.32	
5	Kenya	George Kwoba, Ezra Sambu, Julius Bungei, Thomas Musenbi	3:06.38	
6	Senegal	Mamadou Gueye, El Hadj Seth Mbow, Mamadou Kassé Hanne, Abdoulaye Wagne	3:08.35	
7	Sudan	Nagmeldin Ali Abubakr, William Filip, Mohamed Hafid, Abubaker Kaki	3:09.37	
	South Africa	LJ van Zyl, Pieter De Villiers, Paul Gorries, Alwyn Myburgh	DNF	
