= 2005 European Athletics U23 Championships – Men's 400 metres hurdles =

The men's 400 metres hurdles event at the 2005 European Athletics U23 Championships was held in Erfurt, Germany, at Steigerwaldstadion on 15 and 16 July.

== Medalists ==
Gold	Rhys Williams; United Kingdom
Silver	Minas Alozidis; Greece
Bronze	Ákos Dezső; Hungary

== Results ==
=== Final ===
16 July

Rank	Name	Nationality	Time	Notes
1st place, gold medalist(s)	Rhys Williams	United Kingdom	49.60	
2nd place, silver medalist(s)	Minas Alozidis	Greece	50.04	
3rd place, bronze medalist(s)	Ákos Dezső	Hungary	50.31	
4	Jussi Heikkilä	Finland	50.39	
5	Yves N'Dabian	France	50.96	
6	Nicola Cascella	Italy	51.45	
7	Andrei Kazlouski	Belarus	51.47	
	Eelco Veldhuijzen	Netherlands	DNF	

=== Heats ===
15 July
Qualified: first 2 in each heat and 2 best to the Final

==== Heat 1 ====
Rank	Name	Nationality	Time	Notes
1	Minas Alozidis	Greece	50.68	Q
2	Yves N'Dabian	France	50.92	Q
3	Eelco Veldhuijzen	Netherlands	51.05	q
4	Alejandro Navarro	Spain	51.58	
5	Roberto Donati	Italy	51.95	
6	Gatis Spunde	Latvia	52.22	
7	Kenny Guex	Switzerland	52.43	

==== Heat 2 ====
Rank	Name	Nationality	Time	Notes
1	Ákos Dezső	Hungary	51.01	Q
2	Andrei Kazlouski	Belarus	51.60	Q
3	Javier Gutiérrez	Spain	51.83	
4	David Busch	Germany	51.94	
5	Tomáš Matyska	Czech Republic	52.03	
6	Jakub Szwedzik	Poland	54.31	

==== Heat 3 ====
Rank	Name	Nationality	Time	Notes
1	Rhys Williams	United Kingdom	50.34	Q
2	Jussi Heikkilä	Finland	50.79	Q
3	Nicola Cascella	Italy	51.36	q
4	Justin Eyquem	France	51.76	
5	István Kasper	Hungary	51.87	
6	Edwin de Wit	Belgium	53.09	

== Participation ==
According to an unofficial count, 19 athletes from 15 countries participated in the event.

- Belarus (1)
- Belgium (1)
- Czech Republic (1)
- Finland (1)
- France (2)
- Germany (1)
- Greece (1)
- Hungary (2)
- Italy (2)
- Latvia (1)
- Netherlands (1)
- Poland (1)
- Spain (2)
- Switzerland (1)
- United Kingdom (1)
