= Athletics at the 2005 Summer Universiade – Men's 400 metres hurdles =

The men's 400 metres hurdles event at the 2005 Summer Universiade was held on 17–20 August in İzmir, Turkey.

== Medalists ==
Gold	Silver	Bronze
Kenji Narisako; Japan	Takayuki Koike; Japan	Gregory Little; Jamaica

== Results ==
=== Heats ===
Rank	Heat	Athlete	Nationality	Time	Notes
1	4	Yevgeniy Meleshenko	Kazakhstan	50.30	Q
2	4	Kenji Narisako	Japan	50.32	Q
3	4	Aleksandr Derevyagin	Russia	50.35	Q
4	4	Christian Grossenbacher	Switzerland	50.38	q
5	1	Mikhail Lipskiy	Russia	50.40	Q
6	3	Takayuki Koike	Japan	50.70	Q
7	2	Michal Uhlík	Czech Republic	50.74	Q
8	2	Cédric El-Idrissi	Switzerland	50.76	Q
9	3	Ondřej Daněk	Czech Republic	50.84	Q
10	3	Sotirios Iakovakis	Greece	50.93	Q, SB
11	2	Eduardo Iván Rodríguez	Spain	51.29	Q
12	2	Gregory Little	Jamaica	51.38	q
13	2	Andrey Kozlovskiy	Belarus	51.54	q
14	2	Rhys Williams	Great Britain	51.61	q
15	4	Jussi Heikkilä	Finland	51.62	
16	1	El Hadj Seth Mbow	Senegal	51.75	Q
17	1	Leonid Vershinin	Belarus	51.77	Q
18	3	Hussein Alaa Motar	Iraq	51.98	
19	3	Tuncay Örs	Turkey	52.16	
20	1	Osita Okeagu	Nigeria	52.26	
21	1	Janne Mäkelä	Finland	52.44	
22	3	Séléké Samake	Senegal	52.80	
23	2	Jonnie Lowe	Honduras	52.91	
24	1	Camilo Quevedo	Guatemala	52.97	NJR
25	3	Apisit Kuttiyawan	Thailand	52.99	
26	3	Ioannis Ioannou	Cyprus	53.71	
27	2	Alex Fan Wai Ho	Hong Kong	54.94	
	1	Ákos Dezsö	Hungary	DNS	
	4	Gianni Carabelli	Italy	DNS	
	4	Chen Tien-Wen	Chinese Taipei	DNS	

=== Semifinals ===
Rank	Heat	Athlete	Nationality	Time	Notes
1	1	Kenji Narisako	Japan	49.65	Q
2	1	Leonid Vershinin	Belarus	49.95	Q, SB
3	2	Mikhail Lipskiy	Russia	50.06	Q
4	1	Aleksandr Derevyagin	Russia	50.09	Q
5	1	Michal Uhlík	Czech Republic	50.23	Q
6	2	Takayuki Koike	Japan	50.38	Q
7	2	Gregory Little	Jamaica	50.47	Q
8	2	Cédric El-Idrissi	Switzerland	50.49	Q
9	1	Christian Grossenbacher	Switzerland	50.50	
9	2	Eduardo Iván Rodríguez	Spain	50.50	
11	2	Andrey Kozlovskiy	Belarus	51.08	
12	2	Sotirios Iakovakis	Greece	51.14	
13	2	Ondřej Daněk	Czech Republic	51.48	
14	1	El Hadj Seth Mbow	Senegal	51.69	
	1	Yevgeniy Meleshenko	Kazakhstan	DNF	
	1	Rhys Williams	Great Britain	DNS	

=== Final ===
Rank	Athlete	Nationality	Time	Notes
1st place, gold medalist(s)	Kenji Narisako	Japan	48.96	
2nd place, silver medalist(s)	Takayuki Koike	Japan	49.75	
3rd place, bronze medalist(s)	Gregory Little	Jamaica	49.77	
4	Aleksandr Derevyagin	Russia	49.78	SB
5	Michal Uhlík	Czech Republic	49.79	
6	Mikhail Lipskiy	Russia	49.84	SB
7	Leonid Vershinin	Belarus	50.50	
8	Cédric El-Idrissi	Switzerland	50.61	
