= Jussi Heikkilä =

Finnish hurdler (born 1983)

Jussi Sakari Heikkilä (born 21 March 1983) is a Finnish 400 metre hurdler. His personal best is 49.39 seconds, achieved in May 2008 in Tallahassee, Florida.

He competed at the European Championships in 2002 and at the World Championships in 2009 without reaching the final.

Heikkilä was born in Forssa. He has studied in the United States for a long time and he was fourth at the NCAA Championships in 2008, representing the South Carolina Gamecocks track and field team.

== Competition record ==
Year	Competition	Venue	Position	Event	Notes
Representing Finland
2002	World Junior Championships	Kingston, Jamaica	6th	400 m hurdles	51.35
2002	European Championships	Munich, Germany	28th (h)	400 m hurdles	51.47
2003	European U23 Championships	Bydgoszcz, Poland	21st (h)	400 m hurdles	52.45
2005	European U23 Championships	Erfurt, Germany	4th	400 m hurdles	50.39
2005	Universiade	İzmir, Turkey	15th (h)	400 m hurdles	51.62
2007	Universiade	Bangkok, Thailand	12th (sf)	400 m hurdles	51.04
2009	European Indoor Championships	Turin, Italy	16th (h)	400 m	47.53
2009	Universiade	Belgrade, Serbia	6th	400 m hurdles	50.19
2009	World Championships	Berlin, Germany	25th (h)	400 m hurdles	51.42
2010	European Championships	Barcelona, Spain	23rd (h)	400 m hurdles	52.46
2012	European Championships	Helsinki, Finland	35th (h)	400 m hurdles	52.95
