= Mamadou Kassé Hann =

Senegalese hurdler (born 1986)

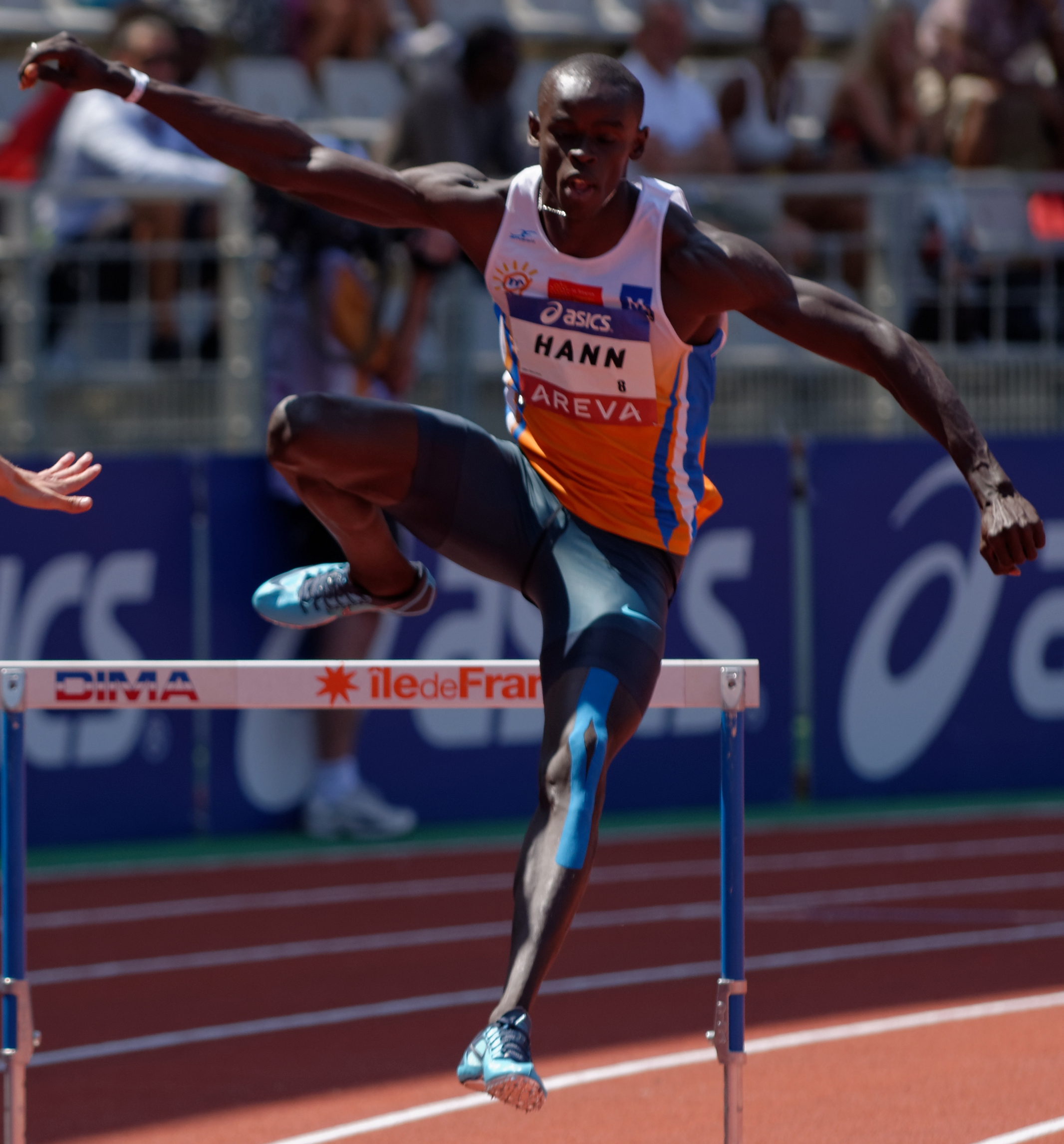
- Hann at the 2013 French Athletics Championships

Personal information
- Born: 10 October 1986 (age 39) Pikine, Dakar, Senegal
- Height: 189 cm (6 ft 2 in)
- Weight: 79 kg (174 lb)

Sport
- Country: Senegal; France
- Sport: Athletics
- Event: 400 m hurdles
- Club: Montpellier Athlétic Méditerranée Métropole
Medal record
Men's athletics
Representing Senegal
African Championships
Silver medal – second place	2012 Porto-Novo	400 m hurdles
Bronze medal – third place	2008 Addis Ababa	4×400 m
Bronze medal – third place	2010 Nairobi	400 m hurdles
Representing France
European Team Championships
Silver medal – second place	2019 Bydgoszcz	4x400 m

Mamadou Kassé Hann (born 10 October 1986) is a Senegalese hurdler. At the 2012 Summer Olympics, he competed in the Men's 400 metres hurdles. He was a finalist at the 2013 World Championships in Athletics, placing seventh. Hanne was a two-time individual medalist at the African Championships in Athletics.

He transferred his eligibility to France on 22 August 2014 and became eligible to represent his adoptive nation internationally from June 2015 onwards.

== Competition record ==
Year	Competition	Venue	Position	Event	Notes
Representing Senegal
2005	African Junior Championships	Radès, Tunisia	8th	400 m hurdles	54.41
2005	African Junior Championships	Radès, Tunisia	3rd	4 × 400 m relay	3:14.43
2006	African Championships	Bambous, Mauritius	14th (h)	400 m hurdles	54.47
2007	All-Africa Games	Algiers, Algeria	12th (h)	400 m hurdles	51.26
2007	All-Africa Games	Algiers, Algeria	6th	4 × 400 m relay	3:08.35
2008	African Championships	Addis Ababa, Ethiopia	11th (h)	400 m hurdles	53.29
2008	African Championships	Addis Ababa, Ethiopia	3rd	4 × 400 m relay	3:05.93
2009	Jeux de la Francophonie	Beirut, Lebanon	3rd	400 m hurdles	50.69
2009	Jeux de la Francophonie	Beirut, Lebanon	1st	4 × 400 m relay	3:06.93
2010	African Championships	Nairobi, Kenya	3rd	400 m hurdles	49.10
2010	African Championships	Nairobi, Kenya	5th (h)	4 × 400 m relay	3:09.87
2012	African Championships	Porto-Novo, Benin	2nd	400 m hurdles	49.39
2012	Olympic Games	London, United Kingdom	10th (sf)	400 m hurdles	48.80
2013	World Championships	Moscow, Russia	7th	400 m hurdles	48.68
2013	Jeux de la Francophonie	Nice, France	1st	400 m hurdles	49.48
Representing France
2016	European Championships	Amsterdam, Netherlands	8th (sf)	400 m hurdles	49.28
2016	European Championships	Amsterdam, Netherlands	12th (h)	4 × 400 m relay	3:04.95
2016	Olympic Games	Rio de Janeiro, Brazil	9th (h)	4 × 400 m relay	3:00.82
2017	World Relays	Nassau, Bahamas	8th	4 × 400 m relay	3:06.33
2017	World Championships	London, United Kingdom	17th (sf)	400 m hurdles	50.35
2018	European Championships	Berlin, Germany	4th	4 × 400 m relay	3:02.08
2021	World Relays	Chorzów, Poland	7th (h)	4 × 400 m relay	3:04.78
