= Takayuki Koike =

Japanese hurdler

Medal record

Men's athletics

Universiade
Silver medal – second place	2005 Izmir	400 m hurdles

Takayuki Koike (Japanese: 小池 崇之; born 12 October 1984) is a retired Japanese athlete who specialized in the 400 metres hurdles.

He won the silver medal at the 2002 Asian Junior Championships, the gold medal at the 2005 East Asian Games, the silver medal at the 2005 Summer Universiade and finished eighth at the 2010 IAAF Continental Cup.

His personal best time was 49.23 seconds, achieved in July 2005 in Tokyo.
