= Alwyn Myburgh =

South African hurdler

Personal information
- Born: 13 October 1980 (age 46) Vanderbijlpark, South Africa

Sport
- Sport: Track and field
Medal record
Representing South Africa
Commonwealth Games
Silver medal – second place	2006 Melbourne	400 m hurdles
African Championships
Silver medal – second place	2006 Bambous	400 m hurdles
Silver medal – second place	2006 Bambous	4×400 m relay
Summer Universiade
Gold medal – first place	2001 Beijing	400 m hurdles

Alwyn Abraham Myburgh (born 13 October 1980) is a South African hurdler.

His personal best time is 48.09 seconds, achieved at the 2001 Summer Universiade in Beijing.

== Achievements ==
Year	Competition	Venue	Position	Event	Notes
Representing South Africa
1999	African Junior Championships	Tunis, Tunisia	1st	400 m hurdles	51.03
1999	African Junior Championships	Tunis, Tunisia	1st	4 × 400 m relay	3:13.01
2000	Olympic Games	Sydney, Australia	13th (sf)	400 m hurdles	49.25
2000	Olympic Games	Sydney, Australia	7th (sf)	4 × 400 m relay	3:01.25
2001	World Championships	Edmonton, Canada	23rd (sf)	400 m hurdles	50.34
2001	World Championships	Edmonton, Canada	10th (h)	4 × 400 m relay	3:01.70
2001	Universiade	Beijing, China	1st	400 m hurdles	48.09 (PB)
2003	World Championships	Paris, France	13th (sf)	400 m hurdles	48.98
2003	World Championships	Paris, France	10th (h)	4 × 400 m relay	3:03.05
2004	Olympic Games	Athens, Greece	7th	400 m hurdles	49.07
2006	Commonwealth Games	Melbourne, Australia	2nd	400 m hurdles	48.23
2006	African Championships	Bambous, Mauritius	2nd	400 m hurdles	49.88
2006	African Championships	Bambous, Mauritius	2nd	4 × 400 m relay	3:07.65
2006	World Athletics Final	Stuttgart, Germany	8th	400 m hurdles	49.47
2007	All-Africa Games	Algiers, Algeria	3rd	400 m hurdles	48.91
2007	All-Africa Games	Algiers, Algeria	8th	4 × 400 m relay	DNF
2007	World Championships	Osaka, Japan	–	400 m hurdles	DNF
2008	Olympic Games	Beijing, China	10th (sf)	400 m hurdles	49.16
2008	Olympic Games	Beijing, China	9th (h)	4 × 400 m relay	3:01.26

=== Personal bests ===
- 100 metres - 10.66 s (2002)
- 400 metres - 46.65 s (2002)
- 400 metres hurdles - 48.09 s (2001)
