= Kenneth Ferguson =

American sprinter and hurdler (born 1984)

Personal information
- Nationality: United States
- Born: March 22, 1984 (age 42) Detroit, Michigan, U.S.
- Height: 6 ft 1 in (1.85 m)
- Weight: 160 lb (73 kg)

Sport
- Sport: Running
- Event(s): 400 metres, 110 metre hurdles, 400 metre hurdles

Achievements and titles
- Personal best(s): 400 m: 45.91 (Baie-Mahault 2007); 110 m H: 13.53 (Knoxville 2003); 400 m H: 48.15 (Carson 2007)
Medal record
Men's athletics
Representing the United States
World Junior Championships
Silver medal – second place	2002 Kingston	400 m hurdles
Pan American Junior Championships
Gold medal – first place	2003 Bridgetown	110 m hurdles
Gold medal – first place	2003 Bridgetown	400 m hurdles
Gold medal – first place	2003 Bridgetown	4×400 m relay

Kenneth Ferguson (born March 22, 1984) is an American sprinter and hurdler who specializes in the 400 metres, 110 and 400 metre hurdles.

He won three gold medals at the 2003 Pan American Junior Athletics Championships, in the 110 metre and 400 meters hurdles, and 4×400 metres relay. He is the husband of multiple Olympic and World Championship medalist Allyson Felix, with whom he has a daughter and a son.
