= Athletics at the 2008 Summer Olympics – Men's 400 metres hurdles =

Men's 400 metres hurdles at the Games of the XXIX Olympiad
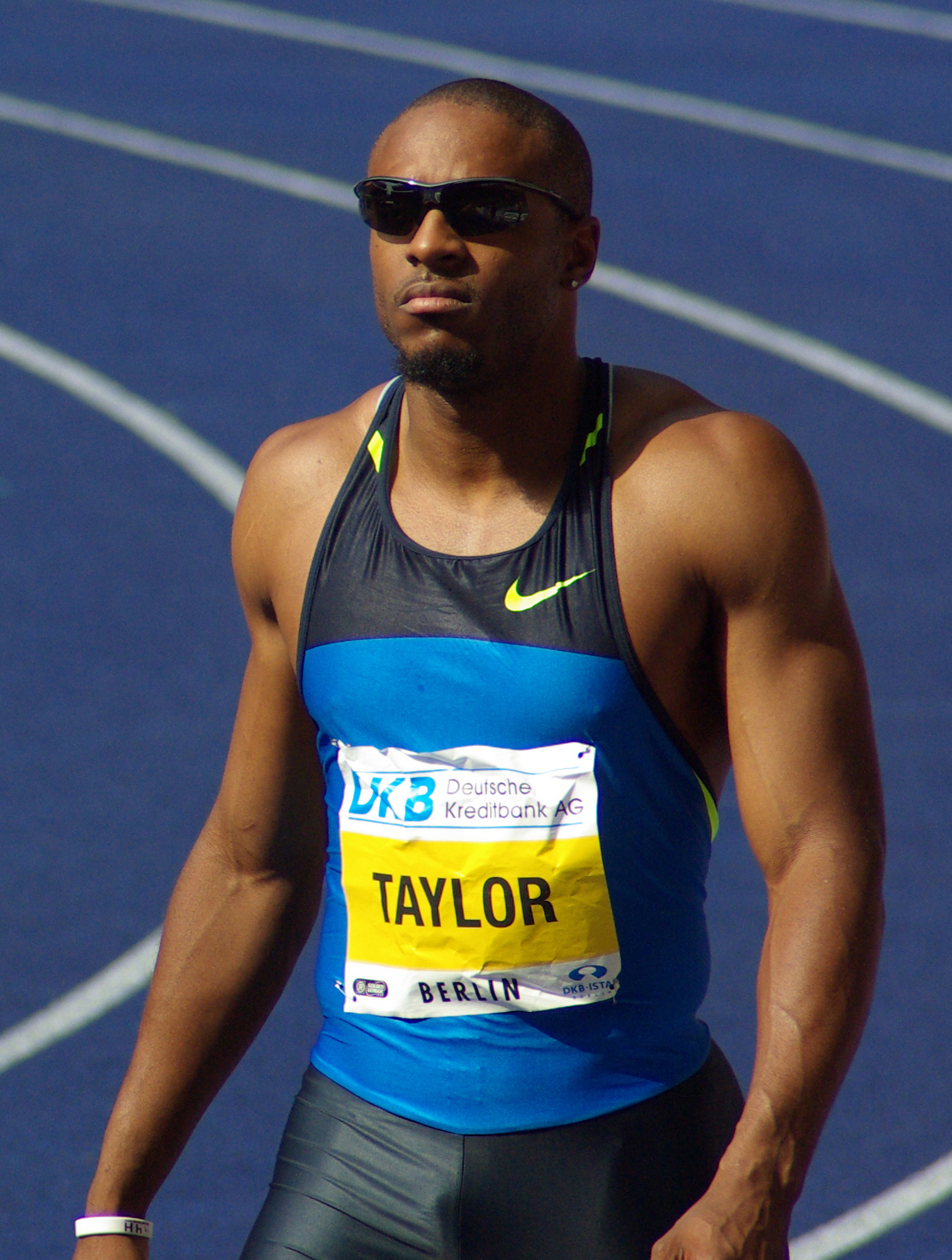
- Angelo Taylor
- Venue: Beijing National Stadium
- Dates: August 15 (quarterfinals); August 16 (semifinals); August 18 (final)
- Competitors: 26 from 19 nations
- Winning time: 47.25

Medalists
1st place, gold medalist(s)		Angelo Taylor; United States
2nd place, silver medalist(s)		Kerron Clement; United States
3rd place, bronze medalist(s)		Bershawn Jackson; United States

The men's 400 metres hurdles at the 2008 Summer Olympics took place on 16–18 August at the Beijing National Stadium. There were 26 competitors from 19 nations. The event was won by Angelo Taylor of the United States, the nation's 18th victory in the men's 400 metres hurdles. Taylor was the seventh man to win multiple medals in the event, and third to win two golds. The United States completed its fifth podium sweep in the men's long hurdles, as Kerron Clement and Bershawn Jackson took silver and bronze.

== Background ==
This was the 24th time the event was held. It had been introduced along with the men's 200 metres hurdles in 1900, with the 200 being dropped after 1904 and the 400 being held through 1908 before being left off the 1912 programme. However, when the Olympics returned in 1920 after World War I, the men's 400 metres hurdles was back and would continue to be contested at every Games thereafter.

Five of the eight finalists from the 2004 Games returned: gold medalist Félix Sánchez of the Dominican Republic, silver medalist Danny McFarlane of Jamaica, fifth-place finisher Bayano Kamani of Panama, sixth-place finisher Marek Plawgo of Poland, and seventh-place finisher Alwyn Myburgh of South Africa. Also returning was 2000 gold medalist American Angelo Taylor, who had been defeated in the semifinals in Athens 2004. Taylor was joined by the last two World Champions on the American team; Bershawn Jackson had won in 2005 and Kerron Clement in 2007.

The People's Republic of China and Kyrgyzstan each made their debut in the event. The United States made its 23rd appearance, most of any nation, having missed only the boycotted 1980 Games.

== Summary ==
The defending champion was "The Dictator" Félix Sánchez, but his reign ended short when he received the news of his grandmother, Lilian's death, just before his heat. He ran an uninspired race and was eliminated, though he returned four years later to again win the gold medal. The current world champion, defeating Sanchez, Kerron Clement looked like the likely favorite. Also in the field was 2000 Olympic champion Angelo Taylor. Taylor and Bershawn Jackson ran the fastest times in the semi-finals and got the outer center lanes Taylor in 6, Jackson in 7. The other semi was won by Clement in 4 and masters aged Danny McFarlane in 5. Nobody was in lane one in lane races at these Olympics.

Taylor and Clement were out fast, with Taylor making up the stagger on the typically slow starting Jackson by the third hurdle. McFarlane was the only one to stay with the American duo who were almost clearing hurdles in unison to the middle of the second turn. Starting at the seventh hurdle, Taylor started to have a slight edge, with both Taylor and Clement coming off the turn together, free of McFarlane and the rest of the field. McFarlane took the ninth hurdle awkwardly at the same time as "Batman" Jackson began his patented sprint to the finish. Clement also hit the ninth hurdle and struggled, taking two extra steps to carefully clear the tenth hurdle. Meanwhile, Taylor kept his stride, powerfully clearing the final hurdle and sprinting to victory. With Clement slowing and Jackson sprinting, the gap between the two narrowed quickly but Clement was able to hold on for silver. McFarlane took the final hurdle smoothly and also mounted a charge, but was not able to catch Jackson's furious dive at Clement leaving the results as an American sweep. Three days later, America would duplicate the sweep in the 400 metres.

In repeating as Olympic champion non-consecutively, Taylor joined a club including Paavo Nurmi, Volodymyr Holubnychy, Heike Drechsler, Nina Romashkova and Edwin Moses (caused by the boycott). Ulrike Meyfarth did it 12 years apart. Sánchez, along with Meseret Defar and Ezekiel Kemboi would complete the same feat four years later.

== Qualification ==
Each National Olympic Committee (NOC) was able to enter up to three entrants providing they had met the A qualifying standard (49.20) in the qualifying period (1 January 2007 to 23 July 2008). The maximum number of athletes per nation had been set at 3 since the 1930 Olympic Congress. NOCs were also permitted to enter one athlete providing he had met the B standard (49.50) in the same qualifying period.

== Competition format ==
The competition used the three-round format used every Games since 1908 (except the four-round competition in 1952): quarterfinals, semifinals, and a final. The number of semifinals was reduced from 3 to 2 as the size of the field was smaller than 2000 and 2004. Ten sets of hurdles were set on the course. The hurdles were 3 feet (91.5 centimetres) tall and were placed 35 metres apart beginning 45 metres from the starting line, resulting in a 40 metres home stretch after the last hurdle. The 400 metres track was standard.

There were 4 quarterfinal heats with between 6 and 7 athletes each. The top 3 men in each quarterfinal advanced to the semifinals along with the next fastest 4 overall. The 16 semifinalists were divided into 2 semifinals of 8 athletes each, with the top 4 in each semifinal advancing to the 8-man final.

== Records ==
Prior to this competition, the existing world record, Olympic record, and world leading time were as follows:

World record	Kevin Young (USA)	46.78	Barcelona, Spain	6 August 1992
Olympic record	Kevin Young (USA)	46.78	Barcelona, Spain	6 August 1992
World Leading	Kerron Clement (USA)	47.79	Kingston, Jamaica	3 May 2008

No new world or Olympic records were set during this competition.

== Schedule ==
All times are China Standard Time (UTC+8)

Date	Time	Round
Friday, 15 August 2008	21:55	Quarterfinals
Saturday, 16 August 2008	21:15	Semifinals
Monday, 18 August 2008	22:00	Final

== Results ==
=== Quarterfinals ===
==== Quarterfinal 1 ====
Rank	Athlete	Nation	Time	Notes
1	Bershawn Jackson	United States	49.20	Q
2	Pieter de Villiers	South Africa	49.24	Q
3	Mahau Suguimati	Brazil	49.45	Q
4	Jonathan Williams	Belize	49.61	q
5	Kenji Narisako	Japan	49.63	
6	Edivaldo Monteiro	Portugal	49.89	SB
7	Harouna Garba	Niger	55.14	

==== Quarterfinal 2 ====
Rank	Athlete	Nation	Time	Notes
1	Angelo Taylor	United States	48.67	Q
2	Danny McFarlane	Jamaica	48.86	Q
3	Alwyn Myburgh	South Africa	48.92	Q, SB
4	Bayano Kamani	Panama	49.05	q, SB
5	Aleksandr Derevyagin	Russia	49.19	q
6	Ibrahima Maiga	Mali	50.57	

==== Quarterfinal 3 ====
Rank	Athlete	Nation	Time	Notes
1	Markino Buckley	Jamaica	48.65	Q, PB
2	L. J. van Zyl	South Africa	48.86	Q
3	Marek Plawgo	Poland	49.17	Q
4	Javier Culson	Puerto Rico	49.60	q
5	Meng Yan	China	49.73	SB
6	Aleksey Pogorelov	Kyrgyzstan	51.47	

==== Quarterfinal 4 ====
Rank	Athlete	Nation	Time	Notes
1	Kerron Clement	United States	49.42	Q
2	Periklis Iakovakis	Greece	49.50	Q
3	Isa Phillips	Jamaica	49.55	Q
4	Dai Tamesue	Japan	49.82	
5	Félix Sánchez	Dominican Republic	51.10	
6	Mowen Boino	Papua New Guinea	51.47	SB
—	Yevgeniy Meleshenko	Kazakhstan	DNF	

=== Semifinals ===
==== Semifinal 1 ====
Rank	Athlete	Nation	Time	Notes
1	Angelo Taylor	United States	47.94	Q
2	Bershawn Jackson	United States	48.02	Q
3	L. J. van Zyl	South Africa	48.57	Q
4	Marek Plawgo	Poland	48.75	Q
5	Isa Phillips	Jamaica	48.85	
6	Aleksandr Derevyagin	Russia	49.23	
7	Pieter de Villiers	South Africa	49.44	
8	Javier Culson	Puerto Rico	49.85	

==== Semifinal 2 ====
Rank	Athlete	Nation	Time	Notes
1	Kerron Clement	United States	48.27	Q
2	Danny McFarlane	Jamaica	48.33	Q
3	Markino Buckley	Jamaica	48.50	Q
4	Periklis Iakovakis	Greece	48.69	Q
5	Alwyn Myburgh	South Africa	49.16	
6	Jonathan Williams	Belize	49.64	
7	Mahau Suguimati	Brazil	50.16	
8	Bayano Kamani	Panama	50.48	

=== Final ===
Rank	Athlete	Nation	Time	Notes
1st place, gold medalist(s)	Angelo Taylor	United States	47.25	PB
2nd place, silver medalist(s)	Kerron Clement	United States	47.98	
3rd place, bronze medalist(s)	Bershawn Jackson	United States	48.06	
4	Danny McFarlane	Jamaica	48.30	SB
5	L. J. van Zyl	South Africa	48.42	
6	Marek Plawgo	Poland	48.52	SB
7	Markino Buckley	Jamaica	48.60	
8	Periklis Iakovakis	Greece	49.96	

== Results summary ==
Rank	Athlete	Nation	Quarterfinals	Semifinals	Final	Notes
1st place, gold medalist(s)	Angelo Taylor	United States	48.67	47.94	47.25	PB
2nd place, silver medalist(s)	Kerron Clement	United States	49.42	48.27	47.98	
3rd place, bronze medalist(s)	Bershawn Jackson	United States	49.20	48.02	48.06	
4	Danny McFarlane	Jamaica	48.86	48.33	48.30	SB
5	L. J. van Zyl	South Africa	48.86	48.57	48.42	
6	Marek Plawgo	Poland	49.17	48.75	48.52	SB
7	Markino Buckley	Jamaica	48.65	48.50	48.60	PB
8	Periklis Iakovakis	Greece	49.50	48.69	49.96	
9	Isa Phillips	Jamaica	49.55	48.85	Did not advance	
10	Alwyn Myburgh	South Africa	48.92	49.16	Did not advance	
11	Aleksandr Derevyagin	Russia	49.19	49.23	Did not advance	
12	Pieter de Villiers	South Africa	49.24	49.44	Did not advance	
13	Jonathan Williams	Belize	49.61	49.64	Did not advance	
14	Javier Culson	Puerto Rico	49.60	49.85	Did not advance	
15	Mahau Suguimati	Brazil	49.45	50.16	Did not advance	
16	Bayano Kamani	Panama	49.05	50.48	Did not advance	
17	Kenji Narisako	Japan	49.63	Did not advance		
18	Meng Yan	China	49.73	Did not advance		SB
19	Dai Tamesue	Japan	49.82	Did not advance		
20	Edivaldo Monteiro	Portugal	49.89	Did not advance		SB
21	Ibrahima Maiga	Mali	50.57	Did not advance		
22	Félix Sánchez	Dominican Republic	51.10	Did not advance		
23	Mowen Boino	Papua New Guinea	51.47	Did not advance		SB
23	Aleksey Pogorelov	Kyrgyzstan	51.47	Did not advance		
25	Harouna Garba	Niger	55.14	Did not advance		
26	Yevgeniy Meleshenko	Kazakhstan	DNF	Did not advance		
