= Kurt Couto =

Mozambican hurdler (born 1985)

Personal information
- Born: 14 May 1985 (age 41) Maputo, Mozambique
- Height: 1.80 m (5 ft 11 in)
- Weight: 74 kg (163 lb)

Sport
- Country: Mozambique
- Sport: Athletics
- Event: 400m Hurdles
Medal record
Men's athletics
Representing Mozambique
African Championships
| Bronze medal – third place | 2006 Bambous | 400 m hurdles |

Kurt Leonel da Rocha Couto (born 14 May 1985 in Maputo) is an athlete from Mozambique who specializes in 400 metres hurdles.

== Life ==
At the age of 17, he moved to South Africa to train.

His personal best in the 400 metres is 46.50 (Windhoek, 2007) and 49.02 in the 400 metres hurdles (Prague 2012).

He was flag bearer for his country at the Olympics three times (2004 Summer, 2008 Summer and 2012 Summer). He was also Mozambique's flag-bearer at the 2014 Commonwealth Games. At the 2016 Olympic Games, Couto retired after the first round, with a time of 49.74 seconds.

== Competition record ==
| Year | Competition | Venue | Position | Event | Notes |
|---|---|---|---|---|---|
| 2002 | World Junior Championships | Kingston, Jamaica | 30th (h) | 400 m hurdles | 53.51 |
| 2004 | Olympic Games | Athens, Greece | 31st (h) | 400 m hurdles | 51.18 (NR) |
| 2005 | Islamic Solidarity Games | Mecca, Saudi Arabia | 7th | 400 m hurdles | 52.73 |
| 2005 | World Championships | Helsinki, Finland | 29th (h) | 400 m hurdles | 52.04 |
| 2006 | Commonwealth Games | Melbourne, Australia | 15th (sf) | 400 m hurdles | 52.16 |
| 2006 | African Championships | Bambous, Mauritius | 3rd | 400 m hurdles | 50.72 |
| 2006 | Lusophony Games | Macau | 1st | 400 m hurdles | 50.29 (NR) |
| 2007 | Universiade | Bangkok, Thailand | 2nd | 400 m hurdles | 49.12 |
| 2007 | World Championships | Osaka, Japan | 27th (h) | 400 m hurdles | 50.06 |
| 2007 | All-Africa Games | Algiers, Algeria | 5th | 400 m hurdles | 50.19 |
| 2008 | African Championships | Addis Ababa, Ethiopia | 13th (h) | 400 m hurdles | 53.84 |
| 2009 | Lusophony Games | Lisbon, Portugal | 3rd | 400 m hurdles | 51.10 |
| 2009 | World Championships | Berlin, Germany | – | 400 m hurdles | DQ |
| 2010 | Ibero-American Championships | San Fernando, Spain | 5th | 400 m hurdles | 51.47 |
| 2010 | African Championships | Nairobi, Kenya | 5th | 400 m hurdles | 49.79 |
| 2010 | Commonwealth Games | Delhi, India | 14th (h) | 400 m hurdles | 51.60 |
| 2011 | Universiade | Shenzhen, China | 3rd | 400 m hurdles | 49.61 |
| 2011 | World Championships | Daegu, South Korea | 23rd (h) | 400 m hurdles | 49.86 |
| 2011 | All-Africa Games | Maputo, Mozambique | 2nd | 400 m hurdles | 51.04 |
| 2012 | African Championships | Porto-Novo, Benin | 7th | 400 m hurdles | 69.53 |
| 2012 | Olympic Games | London, United Kingdom | 22nd (sf) | 400 m hurdles | 51.55 |
| 2014 | Lusophony Games | Goa, India | 1st | 400 m hurdles | 51.97 |
| 2014 | Commonwealth Games | Glasgow, United Kingdom | – | 400 m hurdles | DQ |
| 2015 | World Championships | Beijing, China | 23rd (sf) | 400 m hurdles | 50.58 |
| 2015 | African Games | Brazzaville, Republic of the Congo | 5th | 400 m hurdles | 49.55 |
| 2016 | African Championships | Durban, South Africa | – | 400 m hurdles | DQ |
| 2016 | Olympic Games | Rio de Janeiro, Brazil | 28th (h) | 400 m hurdles | 49.74 |
| 2017 | Islamic Solidarity Games | Baku, Azerbaijan | 3rd | 400 m hurdles | 50.97 |
| 2018 | Commonwealth Games | Gold Coast, Australia | 8th (h) | 400 m hurdles | 49.56 |
| 2018 | African Championships | Asaba, Nigeria | – | 400 m hurdles | DNF |

Olympic Games
| Preceded by Jorge Duvane | Flagbearer for Mozambique; Athens 2004; Beijing 2008; London 2012 | Succeeded by Joaquim Lobo |
