= L. J. van Zyl =

South African hurdler

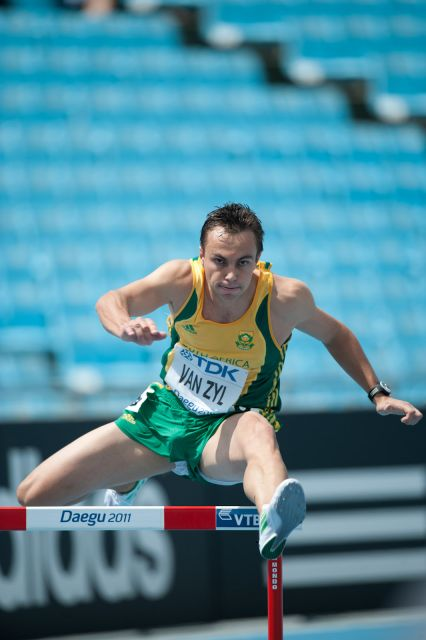
- Van Zyl during the 2011 World Athletics Championships

Personal information
- Born: 20 July 1985 (age 41) Bloemfontein, South Africa
- Height: 1.82 m (5 ft 11 1/2 in)
- Weight: 79 kg (174 lb)
- Spouse: Irvette van Zyl

Sport
- Country: South Africa
- Sport: Athletics
- Events: 400 metre hurdles 4 × 400m Relay
Medal record
Men's athletics
Representing South Africa
World Championships
Silver medal – second place	2011 Daegu	4x400 m
Bronze medal – third place	2011 Daegu	400 m hurdles
Commonwealth Games
Gold medal – first place	2006 Melbourne	400 m hurdles
Silver medal – second place	2006 Melbourne	4x400 m
Silver medal – second place	2010 Delhi	400 m hurdles
All-Africa Games
Gold medal – first place	2007 Algiers	400 m hurdles
African Championships
Gold medal – first place	2006 Bambous	400 m hurdles
Gold medal – first place	2008 Addis Ababa	400 m hurdles
Gold medal – first place	2008 Addis Ababa	4x400 m
Gold medal – first place	2010 Nairobi	400 m hurdles
Bronze medal – third place	2016 Durban	4×400 m

Louis Jacobus van Zyl (born 20 July 1985), better known as L. J. van Zyl, is a retired South African athlete who competed in the 400 metre hurdles. He is the South African record holder in the event with a personal best of 47.66 seconds, which he achieved twice, three months apart. His time ranks him in the all-time top 25. He is a three-time African Champion in the event and competed for his country at the 2008, 2012 and 2016 Summer Olympics.

He was the 2002 World Junior Champion over 400 m hurdles and reached the World Championships final at the age of twenty in 2005. His breakthrough into the senior ranks came in 2006 when he won gold medals at the Commonwealth Games and African Championships, as well as silver medals at the IAAF World Cup and IAAF World Athletics Final. He became the All-Africa Games champion in 2007. He came fifth in the 2008 Olympic final.

He married South African long-distance runner Irvette van Blerk in 2012.

== Career ==
Born in Bloemfontein, his first international medal came at the 2001 World Youth Championships in Athletics, where he took the bronze with South Africa in the Swedish medley relay. He won the gold medal in his speciality at the 2002 World Junior Championships in Athletics, but did not medal in his attempt to defend the title at the 2004 competition. His international breakthrough came at the World Athletics Final in 2005, when he finished third.

The next year he won a gold medal at the Commonwealth Games with a new personal best time of 48.05 seconds, which was a new Games record. He also won a silver medal in 4×400 m relay with the South African team. Later that year he claimed his first continental title with a win at the 2006 African Championships in Athletics. He came near his best with a run of 48.08 seconds at the 2006 IAAF World Athletics Final, finishing as runner-up, and secured another silver medal at the 2006 IAAF World Cup.

He was off colour in 2007, being eliminated in the heats at the 2007 World Championships in Athletics and finishing eighth at the 2007 IAAF World Athletics Final. However, he did manage to win the hurdles title at the 2007 All-Africa Games in Algiers that July. He rebounded the following year and retained his title at the 2008 African Championships and earned a place on the South African Olympic team. Van Zyl came fifth in the 400 m hurdles final at the 2008 Beijing Olympics, and also ran as part of the national relay team. His clocking of 48.22 seconds at the Athens Grand Prix Tsiklitiria made him the fourth fastest in the event that year.

He was eliminated in the semi-finals at the 2009 World Championships in Athletics, despite entering the competition with the fastest time of the year. He ended the year on a positive note with a silver medal behind Kerron Clement (the new world champion) at the 2009 IAAF World Athletics Final.

Van Zyl set the South African record of 47.66 seconds at an athletics meeting in Pretoria on 25 February 2011, improving upon Llewellyn Herbert's former mark. He made a large improvement upon his 400 m sprint best a month later, taking almost a second off his former best with a run of 44.86 sec at a Yellow Pages Series meeting.

Van Zyl won a bronze medal in the 400m hurdles at the 2011 World Championships in Athletics but again he entered the competition with not only the fastest but the 4 fastest times of the year so perhaps a disappointing result. He later won a silver with the South African team in the 4x400m relay.

== Affiliations ==
- TuksSport – University of Pretoria, South Africa

== Achievements ==
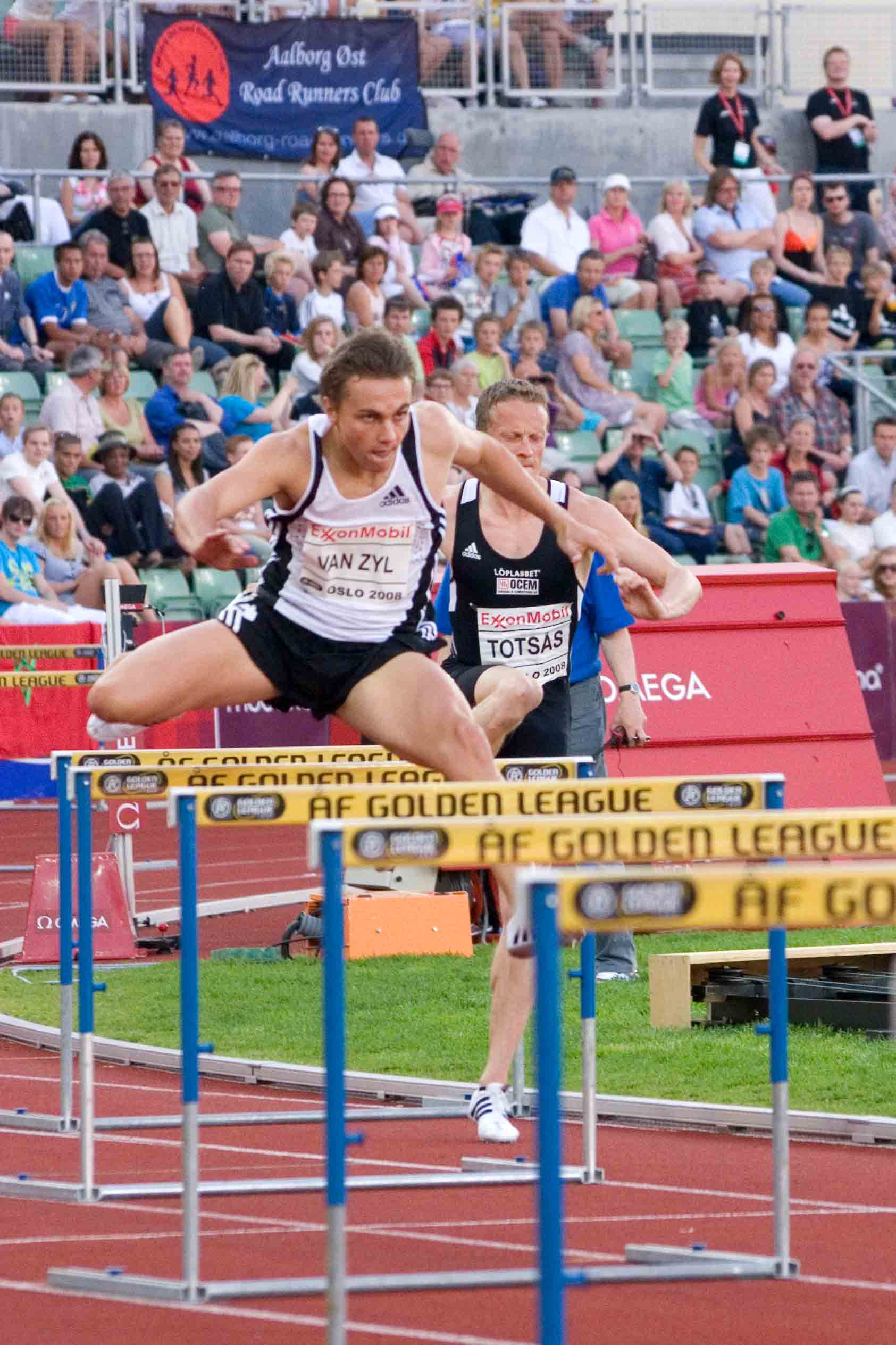
Van Zyl at the 2008 Bislett Games.

Year	Competition	Venue	Position	Event	Notes
Representing South Africa
2001	World Youth Championships	Debrecen, Hungary	3rd	Medley relay	1:51.35
2002	World Junior Championships	Kingston, Jamaica	1st	400m hurdles	48.89 (CR)
2002	World Junior Championships	Kingston, Jamaica	6th (h)	4×400m relay	3:07.65
2004	World Junior Championships	Grosseto, Italy	4th	400 m h	49.06
2004	World Junior Championships	Grosseto, Italy	3rd	4×400 m relay	3:04.50 (AJR)
2005	World Championships	Helsinki, Finland	6th	400 m h	48.54
2005	World Championships	Helsinki, Finland	13th (h)	4×400 m relay	3:04.64
2005	World Athletics Final	Monte Carlo, Monaco	3rd	400 m h	48.11
2006	Commonwealth Games	Melbourne, Australia	1st	400 m h	48.05 (CR)
2006	Commonwealth Games	Melbourne, Australia	2nd	4×400 m relay	3:01.84
2006	African Championships	Bambous, Mauritius	1st	400 m h	49.43
2006	World Athletics Final	Stuttgart, Germany	2nd	400 m h	48.08
2006	World Cup	Athens, Greece	2nd	400 m h	48.35
2007	All-Africa Games	Algiers, Algeria	1st	400 m h	48.74
2007	All-Africa Games	Algiers, Algeria	–	4×400 m relay	DNF
2007	World Championships	Osaka, Japan	23rd (h)	400 m h	49.71
2008	African Championships	Addis Ababa, Ethiopia	1st	400 m h	48.91
2008	African Championships	Addis Ababa, Ethiopia	1st	4×400 m relay	3:03.58
2008	Olympic Games	Beijing, China	5th	400 m h	48.32
2008	Olympic Games	Beijing, China	9th (h)	4×400 m relay	3:01.26
2009	World Championships	Berlin, Germany	9th (sf)	400 m h	48.80
2009	World Championships	Berlin, Germany	14th (h)	4×100 m relay	39.71
2010	African Championships	Nairobi, Kenya	1st	400 m h	48.51
2010	Commonwealth Games	Delhi, India	2nd	400 m h	48.63
2010	Continental Cup	Split, Croatia	5th	400 m h	49.97
2011	World Championships	Daegu, South Korea	3rd	400 m h	48.80
2011	World Championships	Daegu, South Korea	2nd	4×400 m relay	2:59.87
2012	African Championships	Porto-Novo, Benin	8th	400 m h	DNF
2012	Olympic Games	London, United Kingdom	34th (h)	400 m h	50.31
2012	Olympic Games	London, United Kingdom	8th	4×400 m relay	3:03.46
2013	World Championships	Moscow, Russia	25th (h)	400 m h	50.05
2014	Commonwealth Games	Glasgow, United Kingdom	9th (h)	400 m h	50.07
2014	African Championships	Marrakesh, Morocco	4th	400 m h	49.79
2015	World Championships	Beijing, China	15th (sf)	400 m h	48.89
2016	African Championships	Durban, South Africa	4th	400 m h	49.46
2016	African Championships	Durban, South Africa	3rd	4 × 400 m relay	3:04.73
2016	Olympic Games	Rio de Janeiro, Brazil	12th (sf)	400 m h	49.00
2018	Commonwealth Games	Gold Coast, Australia	17th (h)	400 m h	50.98

=== Personal bests ===
- 400 metres – 44.86 s (2011)
- 400 metres hurdles – 47.66 s (2011)
- 200 metres hurdles-22.10(1.8 m/s)WR
