= Pieter de Villiers (hurdler) =

South African hurdler

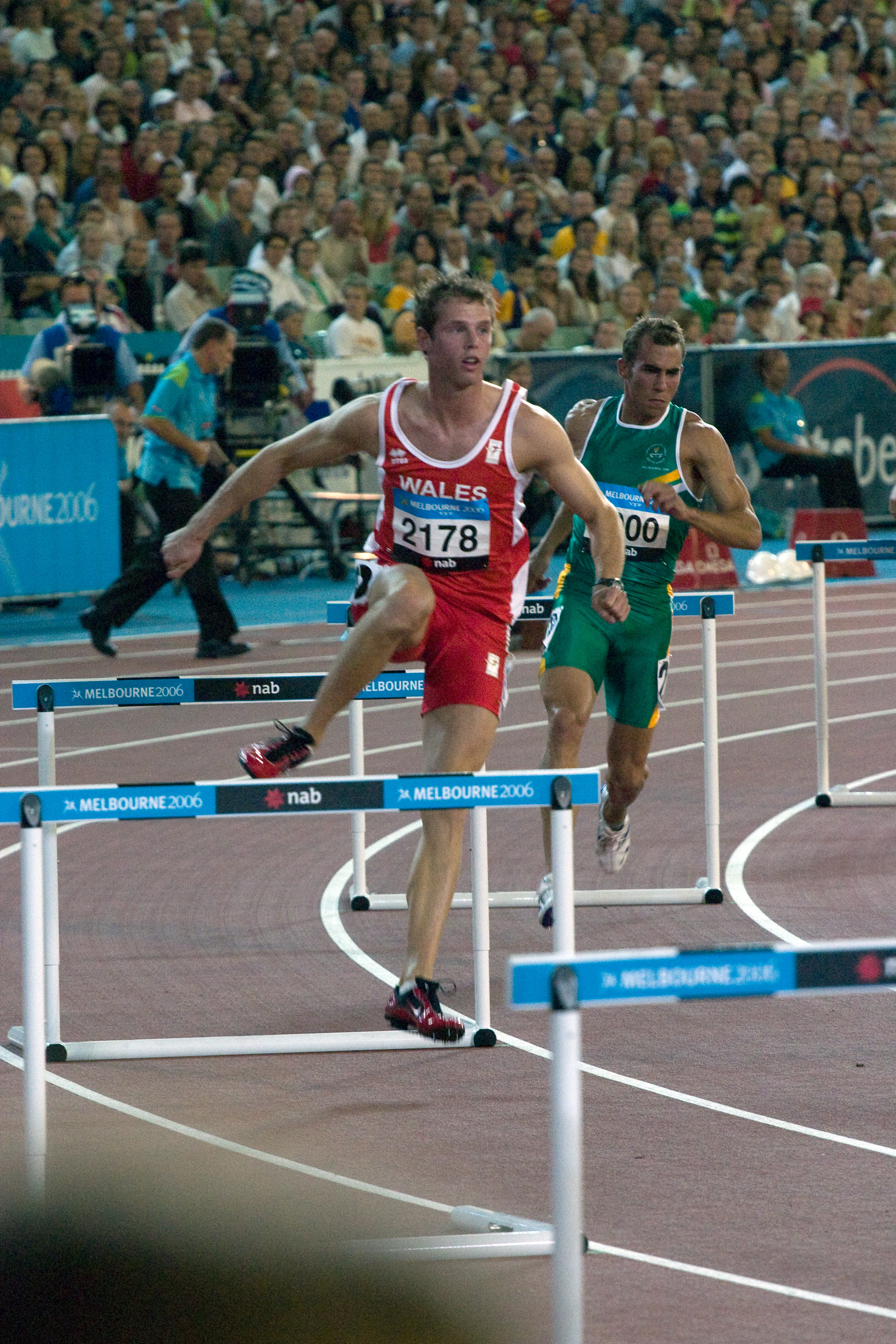
Pieter de Villiers (right) during the 2006 Commonwealth Games 400 metres hurdles final

Pieter de Villiers (born 13 July 1982) is a South African hurdler.

== Achievements ==
Year	Competition	Venue	Position	Event	Notes
Representing South Africa
2000	World Junior Championships	Santiago, Chile	2nd	400 m hurdles	50.52
2000	World Junior Championships	Santiago, Chile	4th	4 × 400 m relay	3:07.66
2005	World Championships	Helsinki, Finland	17th (sf)	400 m hurdles	49.75
2005	World Championships	Helsinki, Finland	13th (h)	4 × 400 m relay	3:04.64
2006	Commonwealth Games	Melbourne, Australia	7th	400 m hurdles	50.51
2006	African Championships	Bambous, Mauritius	4th	400 m hurdles	50.96
2007	All-Africa Games	Algiers, Algeria	2nd	400 m hurdles	48.91
2007	All-Africa Games	Algiers, Algeria	8th	4 × 400 m relay	DNF
2007	World Championships	Osaka, Japan	15th (sf)	400 m hurdles	49.37
2008	Olympic Games	Beijing, China	12th (sf)	400 m hurdles	49.44

=== Personal bests ===
- 400 metres – 46.70 s (2005)
- 400 metres hurdles – 48.46 s (2005)
