= El Hadj Sethe Mbow =

Senegalese hurdler

Medal record

Men's athletics

African Championships
Bronze medal – third place	2008 Addis Ababa	4×400 m

Jeux de la Francophonie
Bronze medal – third place	2005 Niamey	4×400 m

El Hadj Sethe Mbow (born 2 April 1985) is a retired Senegalese athlete who specialized in the 400 metres hurdles.

In the 400 metres hurdles he won the silver medal at the 2003 African Junior Championships, finished fourth at the 2005 Islamic Solidarity Games, eighth at the 2006 African Championships, sixth at the 2007 All-Africa Games and seventh at the 2008 African Championships. He also competed at the 2004 World Junior Championships (semi-final), the 2005 Summer Universiade (semi-final) and the 2005 Jeux de la Francophonie without reaching the final.

In the 4 × 400 metres relay he won a bronze medal at the 2005 Jeux de la Francophonie, finished sixth at the 2007 All-Africa Games, and won a bronze medal at the 2008 African Championships,

His personal best time was 49.86 seconds, achieved in May 2013 in Pueblo. He competed collegiately for Essex County Wolverines.
