= Abderrahmane Hammadi =

Algerian hurdler (born 1984)

Medal record

Men's athletics

Representing Algeria

All-Africa Games
Gold medal – first place	2011 Maputo	400 m hurdles

Pan Arab Games
Gold medal – first place	2007 Cairo	400 m hurdles

African Championships
Silver medal – second place	2008 Addis Ababa	400 m hurdles

Abderrahmane Hammadi (Arabic: حماديعبد الرحمن; born 24 March 1984) is an Algerian former track and field athlete who specialised in the 400 metres hurdles. He competed internationally for Algeria between 2003 and 2011.

He was the gold medallist at the 2011 All-Africa Games and the 2007 Pan Arab Games. His personal best is 49.84 seconds, which is a former Algerian national record and set during a silver medal run at the 2008 African Championships in Athletics. He was also the winner at the 2011 Arab Athletics Championships.

Hammadi began his international career with a bronze medal at the 2003 African Junior Athletics Championships and followed up with a senior bronze at the Islamic Solidarity Games two years later. He won his first Algerian national title in the 400 m hurdles in 2006.

He was a two-time participant at the Summer Universiade (2007, 2009).

== International competitions ==
Year	Competition	Venue	Position	Event	Notes
2003	African Junior Championships	Garoua, Cameroon	3rd	400 m hurdles	52.15
2004	North African Athletics Championships	Algiers, Algeria	2nd	400 m hurdles	51.67
2005	Islamic Solidarity Games	Mecca, Saudi Arabia	3rd	400 m hurdles	50.91
2007	Universiade	Bangkok, Thailand	16th (semis)	400 m hurdles	56.78
2007	Universiade	Bangkok, Thailand	5th	4 × 400 m relay	3:06.85
2007	All-Africa Games	Algiers, Algeria	10th (h)	400 m hurdles	50.86
2007	Pan Arab Games	Cairo, Egypt	1st	400 m hurdles	50.77
2008	African Championships	Addis Ababa, Ethiopia	2nd	400 m hurdles	49.84 NR
2009	Universiade	Belgrade, Serbia	— (semis)	400 m hurdles	DNF
2011	All-Africa Games	Maputo, Mozambique	1st	400 m hurdles	50:48
2011	Arab Championships	Al Ain, United Arab Emirates	1st	400 m hurdles	51.10
