= Osita Okeagu =

Nigerian hurdler

Osita Okeagu (born 29 November 1978) is a Nigerian retired athlete who specialised in the 400 metres hurdles. He won the gold medal in the event at the 2003 All-Africa Games.

His personal best in the event is 51.55 from 2007.

== Competition record ==
Year	Competition	Venue	Position	Event	Notes
Representing Nigeria
1994	World Junior Championships	Lisbon, Portugal	16th (sf)	400m hurdles	53.23
2003	All-Africa Games	Abuja, Nigeria	1st	400 m hurdles	53.16
2003	Afro-Asian Games	Hyderabad, India	3rd	400 m hurdles	50.87
2005	Universiade	İzmir, Turkey	20th (h)	400 m hurdles	52.26
2006	African Championships	Bambous, Mauritius	13th (h)	400 m hurdles	53.99
2007	All-Africa Games	Algiers, Algeria	15th (h)	400 m hurdles	51.55
