= Javier Culson =

Puerto Rican athlete and Olympic bronze medalist hurdler

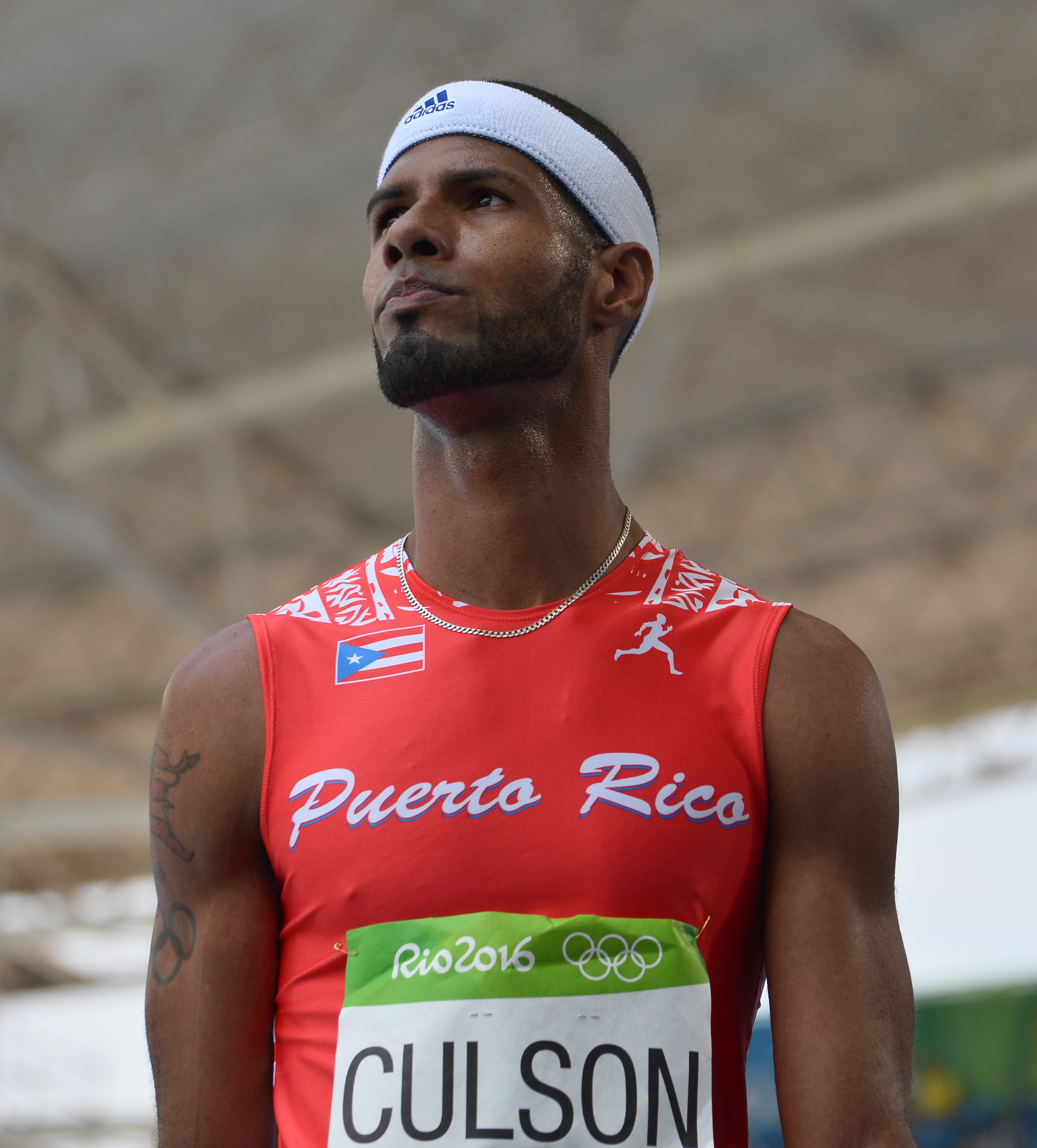
- Culson at the 2016 Summer Olympics

Personal information
- Native name: Javier Culson Pérez.
- Full name: Javier Culson Pérez
- Nationality: Puerto Rico
- Citizenship: Puerto Rico + United States
- Born: 25 July 1984 (age 42) Ponce, Puerto Rico
- Height: 6 ft 7 in (201 cm)
- Weight: 181 lb (82 kg)

Sport
- Sport: Hurdling
- Event: 400 metre hurdles
- Coached by: Héctor "Cano" Amill Alicea

Achievements and titles
- Personal best: 400 m H: 47.72 s (Ponce 2010)
Medal record
Men's athletics
Representing Puerto Rico
Olympic Games
Bronze medal – third place	2012 London	400 m hurdles
World Championships
Silver medal – second place	2009 Berlin	400 m hurdles
Silver medal – second place	2011 Daegu	400 m hurdles
Pan American Games
Silver medal – second place	2015 Toronto	400 m hurdles
Central American and Caribbean Games
Silver medal – second place	2010 Mayagüez	400 m hurdles
Central American and Caribbean Championships
Gold medal – first place	2009 Havana	400 m hurdles
NACAC Championships
Gold medal – first place	2015 Costa Rica	400 m hurdles
Bronze medal – third place	2007 San Salvador	400 m hurdles
Ibero-American Championships
Gold medal – first place	2006 Puerto Rico	400 m hurdles
Pan American Junior Championships
Bronze medal – third place	2003 Bridgetown	400 m hurdles
Representing Americas
Continental Cup
Silver medal – second place	2010 Split	400 m hurdles
Bronze medal – third place	2014 Marrakesh	400 m hurdles
Bronze medal – third place	2014 Marrakesh	4×400 m relay
- Updated on 7 August 2016

Javier Culson Pérez (born 25 July 1984) is a Puerto Rican athlete and Olympiad bronze medalist who specialises in the 400-metre hurdles. After becoming involved with the discipline in his late teen years, he entered the podium in some regional youth events, including the Pan American Junior Athletics Championships. Culson is a two-time silver medallist at the International Association of Athletics Federations's (IAAF) World Championships and an elite contender in the Samsung Diamond League, where he finished second overall in 2011. He has also garnished medals in events with lower profiles, including the Central American and Caribbean Games and the Ibero-American Championships. He currently holds the record as "the world's fastest man" in that category. Culson also competed at the 2012 Olympics in London winning the bronze medal in the 400-metre hurdles race. In the 2016 Olympics in Rio de Janeiro, Culson made it all the way to the finals of the men's 400m hurdles only to be disqualified by a false start.

== Early years and personal life ==
Culson Pérez was born in Barrio Playa, Ponce, Puerto Rico, on 25 July 1984, to Señor Culson and Judith Pérez. One of four siblings, along Javier Ramón Antonio, Judith Marie and Mary Caridad, he was raised solely by his mother in his native Playa de Ponce. Since his birth and throughout his childhood, Culson was a sickly child, suffering from gastritis due to a pronounced line in his abdomen, which limited the types of food that he could eat. This condition, along with an asthma diagnosis, forced him to spend a considerable amount of time in hospitals during his upbringing and extending into his teenager years. To deal with Culson's health and attend to her other children, Judith Pérez left her established job as a nurse at Hospital Oncológico Andrés Grillasca in Ponce and began taking odd jobs, such as babysitting and ironing clothes.

By the time that he was a teenager, all of his siblings were involved in sports. Culson developed an interest in basketball and extreme sports and also entered Long-distance running races. When he was 16 years old, he met Héctor Amill, who trained his sister and soon identified Culson's potential as a hurdles athlete, remaining as his trainer to this day. He completed his high school education at Escuela Jardines de Ponce. Culson then enrolled at American University, where he was part of their athletics team, the Piratas, performing for two years before transferring. Culson then enrolled in the Physical Education program at the Pontifical Catholic University of Puerto Rico, where he was active in the Liga Atlética Interuniversitaria (LAI), the apex inter-university league in Puerto Rico. Culson's first daughter, Yarién Culson Corcino, was born on 29 May 2008, and he has been dedicating his victories to her ever since.

== Athletic career ==
Culson Pérez won his first international gold medal in his home town at the 2006 Ibero-American Championships. He won a bronze medal at the 2007 Summer Universiade with a time of 49.35 seconds. His first major senior tournament was the 2007 World Championships in Athletics. He reached the 400 m hurdles semi-finals at the competition. As one of only six track athletes who made the Puerto Rican Olympic team that year, Culson Pérez competed at the 2008 Beijing Olympics. He progressed to the semi-finals but failed to reach the final.

Culson Pérez began his 2009 pre-season by entering an 800 metres race at Carolina's Clásico de Primavera, winning with a 1:49.95 mark; four seconds over the time required to enter the World Championships in that discipline. In July, he set a personal best of 48.09 seconds in the 400 m hurdles, in the process establishing a Puerto Rican national record. On 18 August 2009, Culson Pérez won the silver medal in the finals of the 400 metres hurdles at the IAAF World Championships in Berlin, Germany. This is the first Medal for Puerto Rico in Athletics at the IAAF World Championships. Guided by Víctor López, Culson Pérez signed a promotional contract with Michael Johnson's Ultimate Performance Sport Management, joining a small group of elite athletes sponsored by this agency. On 14 January 2010, Culson Pérez was named "Athlete of the Year" by the COPUR.

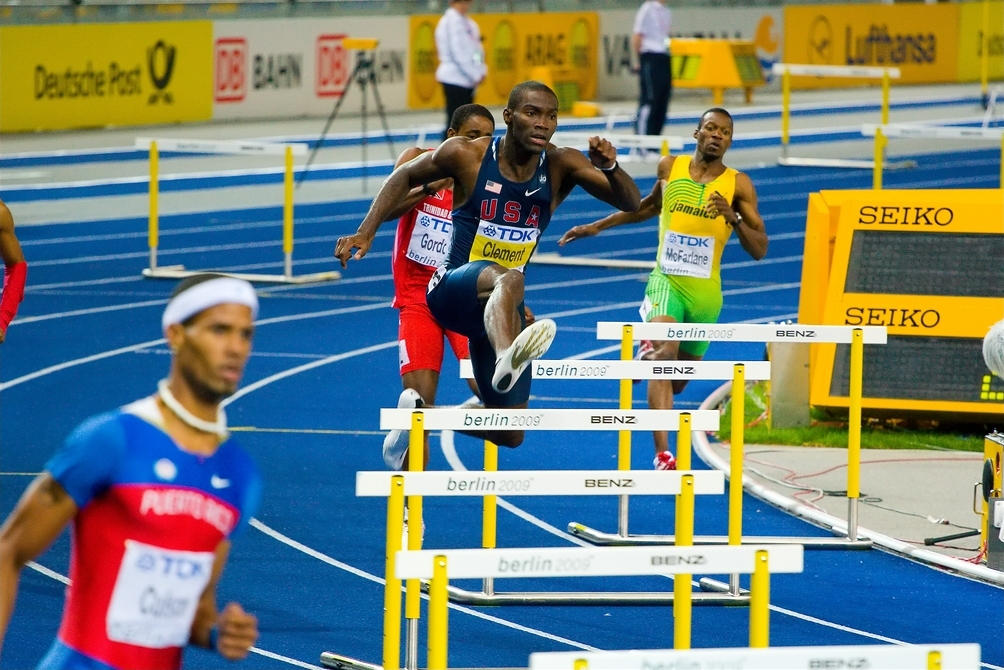
Culson (foreground) competing in the finals of the 2009 World Championships

=== Second World Championships medal ===
After months of inactivity, he began his pre-season preparation, winning the 800 metres race at the Clásico de Primavera with a time of 1:50.13. Culson Pérez opened his 2010 season at the Drake Relays, winning the race with 48.67, one of the best marks of the year up to that point. In his second outing, he recorded 48.48 at the Guadalupe Grand Prix. On 8 May 2010, Culson Pérez established a new personal and national record at the Ponce Grand Prix, breaking the 48-second mark with a 47.72 victory (best overall in the world during the initial part of the season) over Michael Tinsley of the United States (48.46). Culson Pérez then went on to earn his second worldwide silver medal on 1 September 2011 when he clocked 48.44 seconds at the IAAF World Championships in Daegu, South Korea.

== 2012 London Olympics ==
Culson competed in the 2012 Olympics in London on Friday, 3 August; Saturday 4 August, and Monday 6 August. In interviews from his barrio Playa in Ponce, Puerto Rico, his family reported they would be "glued to their TVs" awaiting the moment Culson made entry into the Olympic stadium. He was also selected to be the flagbearer for the Puerto Rico delegation during the Opening Ceremonies of the London Olympics. A local reporter stated that, for the ceremony, most businesses in his barrio Playa closed down and "the streets were deserted". Culson scored the best overall time in the first day of competition, winning the highly-competitive heat 5 with a time of 48.33 seconds, and advancing to the semi-finals. This race also recorded the second best time and qualified more athletes than any other heat. Culson won his semifinal over two-time Olympic winner Angelo Taylor running 47.93 seconds. On 6 August 2012 Culson won the bronze medal in the final of the 400 meter hurdles with a time of 48.10 seconds (less than a half-second behind the gold-medal time), winning Puerto Rico's first Olympic medal in 16 years and the first Olympic athletics medal for his country (all other Puerto Rican medals had been won in boxing).

== Personal bests ==
Event	Time (seconds)	Records	Venue	Date
400 metres hurdles	48.29	NR	Monaco	July 2009
400 metres hurdles	48.09	NR	Berlin	August 2009
400 metres hurdles	47.72	NR, SB	Ponce	May 2010

- All information taken from IAAF profile.

== Progression ==
Season	Performance	Place	Date
2012	47.78	London	13 July 2012
2011	48.32	Brusells	16 September 2011
2010	47.72	Ponce	8 May 2010
2009	48.09	Berlin	18 August 2009
2009	48.29	Monaco	28 July 2009
2008	48.87	Kingston (NS), JAM	3 May 2008
2007	49.07	Kingston (NS), JAM	5 May 2007
2006	49.48	Carolina, PUR	18 March 2006
2005	50.62	Dorado	12 June 2005
2004	50.77	Barquisimeto	28 May 2004
2003	51.10	Bridgetown	20 July 2003

== Honours ==
Year	Competition	Venue	Position	Event	Notes
2003	Pan American Junior Athletics Championships	Bridgetown, Barbados	3rd	400 metres hurdles	51.10
2004	Ibero-American Championships	Huelva, Spain	9th	400 metres hurdles	53.66
2006	Ibero-American Championships	Ponce, Puerto Rico	1st	400 metres hurdles	49.71
2007	World Championships	Osaka, Japan	19th	400 metres hurdles	49.64
2007	Pan American Games	Rio de Janeiro, Brazil	6th	400 metres hurdles	49.46
2007	NACAC Championships	San Salvador, El Salvador	3rd	400 metres hurdles	49.31
2008	XXIX Olympiad	Beijing, China	8th	400 metres hurdles	49.85
2009	World Championships	Berlin, Germany	2nd	400 metres hurdles	48.09
2009	Central American and Caribbean Championships in Athletics	Havana, Cuba	1st	400 metres hurdles	48.51
2010	Continental Cup	Split, Croatia	2nd	400 metres hurdles	48.08
2010	Central American and Caribbean Games	Mayagüez, Puerto Rico	2nd	400 metres hurdles	48.58
2011	Central American and Caribbean Championships in Athletics	Mayagüez, Puerto Rico	4th	400 metres hurdles	50.27
2011	World Championships	Daegu, South Korea	2nd	400 metres hurdles	48.44
2012	XXX Olympiad	London, United Kingdom	3rd	400 metres hurdles	48.10
2013	World Championships	Moscow, Russia	6th	400 metres hurdles	48.38
2014	Continental Cup	Marrakesh, Morocco	3rd	400 metres hurdles	48.88
2014	Continental Cup	Marrakesh, Morocco	3rd	4 × 400 metres relay	3:02.78
2015	World Championships	Beijing, China	18th	400 metres hurdles	49.36
2015	Pan American Games	Toronto, Canada	2nd	400 metres hurdles	48.67
2015	NACAC Championships	San José, Costa Rica	1st	400 metres hurdles	48.70
2016	Summer Olympics	Rio de Janeiro, Brazil	4th (sf)	400 metres hurdles	48.46^{1}
2017	World Championships	London, United Kingdom	27th (h)	400 metres hurdles	50.33

^{1}Disqualified in the final

== Other recognitions ==
In 2010 he was voted "Puerto Rico's Athlete of the Year".

In 2011, he was homaged by the Puerto Rico House of Representatives upon becoming the first Puerto Rican athlete to receive a medal at the 2011 World Championships in Athletics.

After euphoric moments when Culson's final London 2012 Olympics race was being watched by Puerto Rico Governor Luis Fortuno, Ponce Mayor Maria Melendez, Culson's family and over 3,000 people on a huge screen at Plaza Las Delicias, Culson's home town of Ponce hosted a celebration to his honor upon his return from London on 14 August 2012.

== See also ==
- List of Puerto Ricans

Olympic Games
Preceded by McWilliams Arroyo	Flagbearer for Puerto Rico; London 2012	Succeeded by Jaime Espinal
