= Bershawn Jackson =

American hurdler

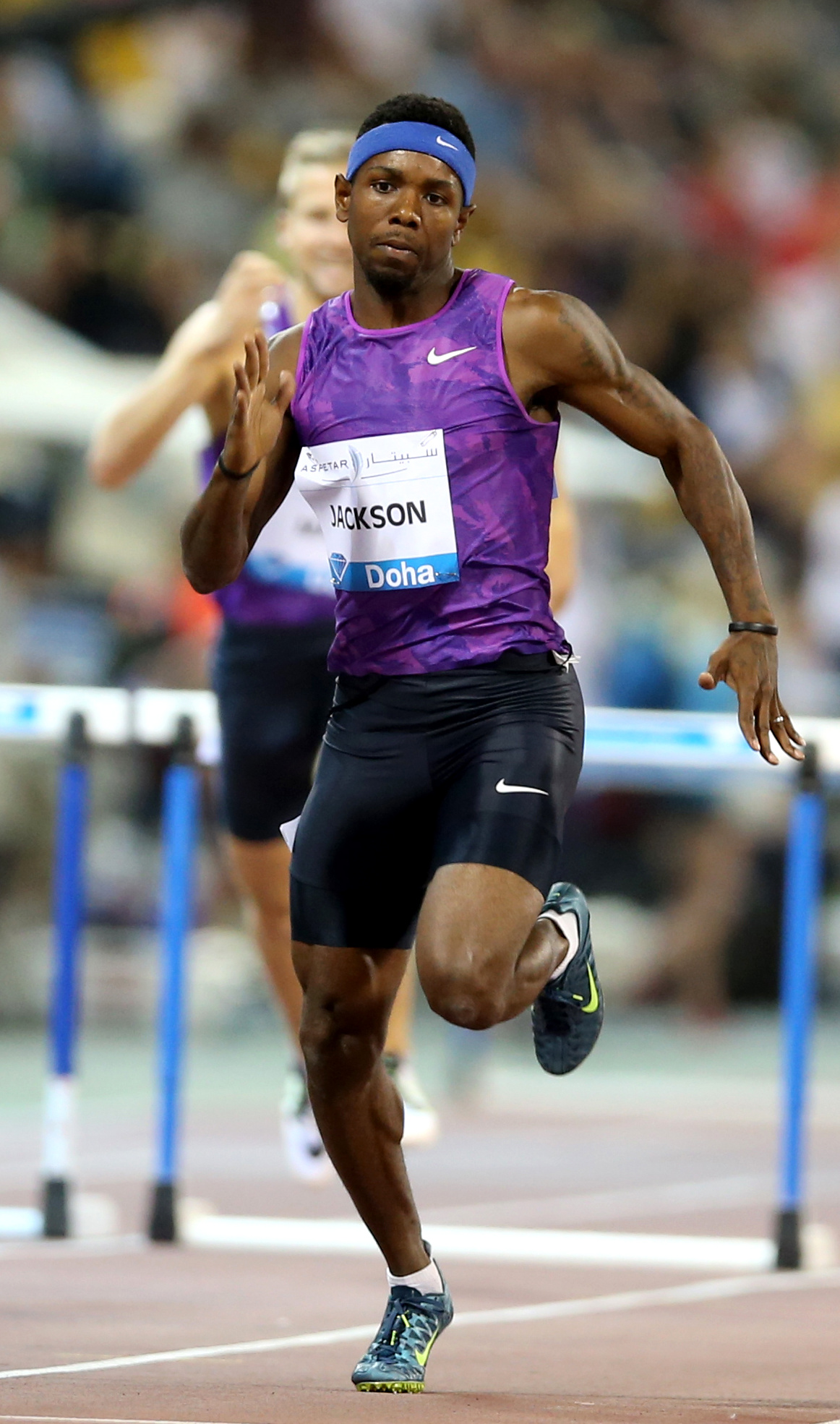
- Jackson in 2015

Personal information
- Nickname: Batman
- Born: May 8, 1983 (age 43) Miami, Florida, United States
- Height: 5 ft 8 in (1.73 m)
- Weight: 158 lb (72 kg)

Sport
- Sport: Running
- Club: Nike, Beaverton

Achievements and titles
- Personal bests: 400 m: 45.06; 400 m hurdles: 47.30
Medal record
Men's athletics
Representing the United States
Olympic Games
Bronze medal – third place	2008 Beijing	400 m hurdles
World Championships
Gold medal – first place	2005 Helsinki	400 m hurdles
Gold medal – first place	2007 Osaka	4 × 400 m relay
Gold medal – first place	2009 Berlin	4 × 400 m relay
Gold medal – first place	2011 Daegu	4 × 400 m relay
Bronze medal – third place	2009 Berlin	400 m hurdles
World Indoor Championships
Gold medal – first place	2010 Doha	4 × 400 m relay
Continental Cup
Bronze medal – third place	2010 Split	400 m hurdles

Bershawn D. Jackson (born May 8, 1983) is an American athlete, who mainly competes in the 400 m hurdles, but also is a 400 m runner.

At the 2008 Summer Olympics, Bershawn "Batman" Jackson won a bronze medal in the 400 m hurdles. He also has three medals (two gold, one bronze) at the World Championships and one gold medal at the World Indoor Championships.

== Career ==
Jackson first came to prominence while running for Miami Central High School, where he set the still standing FHSAA (Florida High School) record in the 300 meter hurdles at 36.01 in 2002. He then continued to run at the college level at Saint Augustine's University and set a Division II National Championship Record of 48.50 in the 400 m hurdles in 2004.

== Personal bests ==
Event	Time	Venue	Date
400 m	45.06	Indianapolis, Indiana	June 22, 2007
400 m hurdles	47.30	Helsinki	August 9, 2005
