= Vincent Kiplangat Kosgei =

Kenyan hurdler

Personal information
- Born: 11 November 1985 (age 40)
- Height: 1.72 m (5 ft 7 1/2 in)
- Weight: 62 kg (137 lb)

Sport
- Country: Kenya
- Sport: Athletics
- Event: 400m Hurdles
Medal record
Men's athletics
Representing Kenya
African Championships
| Gold medal – first place | 2010 Nairobi | 4×400 m |

Vincent Kiplangat Kosgei is a Kenyan hurdler. At the 2012 Summer Olympics, he competed in the Men's 400 metres hurdles.
