= Brendan Cole (sprinter) =

Australian hurdler (born 1981)

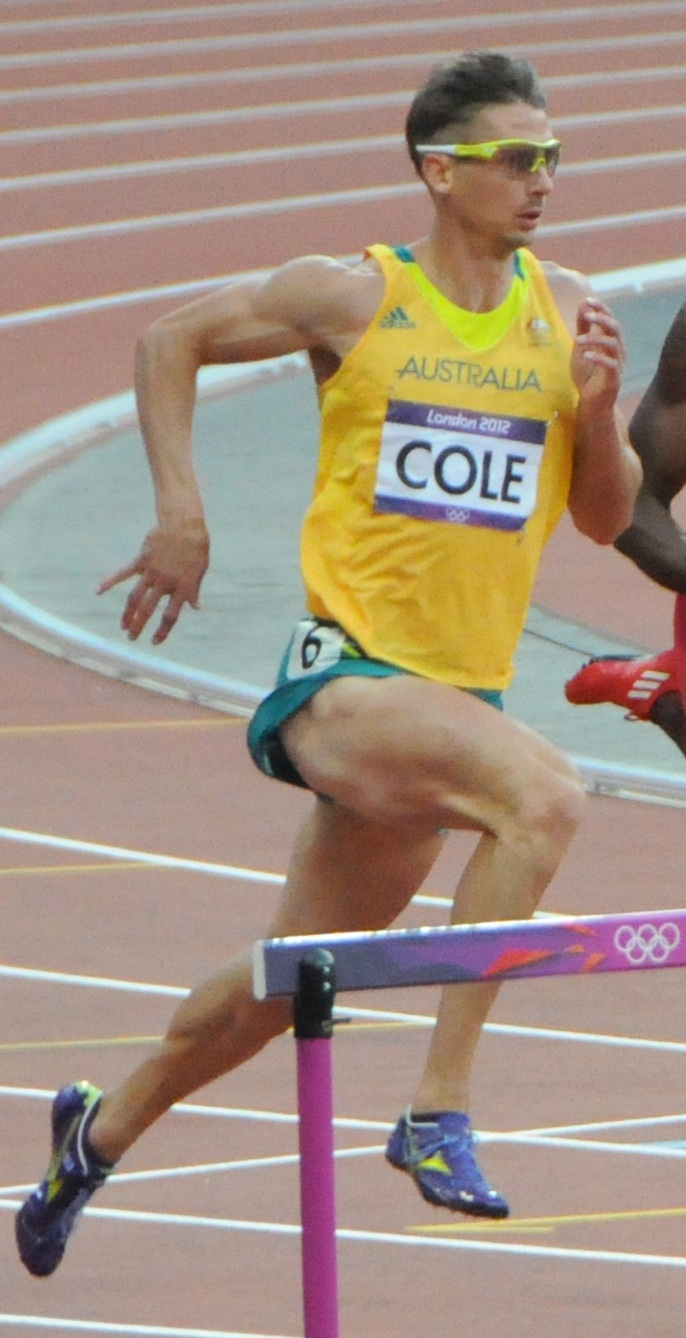
- Brendan Cole at the 2012 Summer Olympics

Personal information
- Born: 29 May 1981 (age 45)
- Height: 1.87 m (6 ft 1 1/2 in)
- Weight: 78 kg (172 lb)

Sport
- Country: Australia
- Sport: Athletics
- Event: 4 × 400m Relay
Medal record
Competitor for Australia
Commonwealth Games
Gold medal – first place	2010 Delhi	Men's 4 x 400 metres relay

Brendan Cole (born 29 May 1981) is an Australian hurdler. At the 2012 Summer Olympics, he competed in the Men's 400 metres hurdles and the Men's 4 × 400 metres relay.

Cole was a member of the Australian 4 × 400 metres relay team that won the gold medal at the 2010 Commonwealth Games in Dehli.

In 2012, Cole won the prestigious Burnie Gift, becoming the first athlete from Australia's capital city - Canberra, to win the Burnie Gift.
