= Mohamed Hafid =

Footballer (born 2004)

Personal information
- Date of birth: 1 December 2004 (age 21)
- Place of birth: Cherbourg, France
- Position: Forward

Team information
- Current team: Caen
- Number: 22

Youth career
- –2019: Cherbourg
- 2019–2020: Quevilly-Rouen
- 2020–2023: Caen

Senior career*
Years	Team	Apps	(Gls)
2021–	Caen B	49	(5)
2023–	Caen	54	(4)

International career^{‡}
2023–	Morocco U20	2	(0)
- * Club domestic league appearances and goals as of 23 June 2026 ‡ National team caps and goals as of 00:50, 8 September 2023 (UTC)

Mohamed Hafid (Arabic: محمد حفيظ; born 1 December 2004) is a professional footballer who plays as a forward for Ligue 3 club Caen. Born in France, he represents Morocco at youth international level.

== Club career ==
On 26 July 2022, Hafid signed his first professional contract with Caen, a deal until 2025. After having been called up to the first team for the first time by manager Jean-Marc Furlan in September 2022, Hafid eventually made his professional debut in a 2–1 Ligue 2 win over Sochaux on 20 January 2023. He went on to play ten league matches in his first professional season.

== International career ==
Born in France, Hafid is eligible to represent both France and Morocco. In June 2023, he was selected to play with the Morocco under-20s at the Maurice Revello Tournament in Toulon, France.

== Honours ==
Caen U18

- Coupe Gambardella runner-up: 2021–22
