= Ibrahima Maïga =

Malian hurdler (born 1979)

Medal record

Men's athletics

Representing Mali

African Championships
Bronze medal – third place	2008 Addis Ababa	400 m hurdles

Ibrahima Maïga (born 14 March 1979) is a Malian hurdler. He was born in Sareyamou.

He finished fourth at the 2004 African Championships, fifth at the 2006 African Championships and won the bronze medal at the 2008 African Championships. He also competed at the World Championships in 2005 and 2007 as well as the Olympic Games in 2004 and 2008 without reaching the final.

His personal best time is 49.13 seconds, achieved in April 2007 in Dakar.
