= 2006 European Cup Super League =

These are the full results of the 2006 European Cup Super League which was held on 28 and 29 June 2006 at the Estadio Ciudad de Málaga in Málaga, Spain.

== Final standings ==
Men

Pos	Country	Pts
1st place, gold medalist(s)	France	118
2nd place, silver medalist(s)	Russia	116
3rd place, bronze medalist(s)	Great Britain	109
4	Poland	107
5	Ukraine	103
6	Spain	99.5
7	Italy	93
8	Germany	86.5
9	Finland	65

- Finland, Italy & Spain relegated, Germany saved as they were to host the 2007 competition.
- Belgium & Greece both promoted to the Superleague for 2007 from League 1.

Women

Pos	Country	Pts
1st place, gold medalist(s)	Russia	155
2nd place, silver medalist(s)	Poland	115.5
3rd place, bronze medalist(s)	Ukraine	99
4	France	98
5	Germany	93
6	Spain	90
7	Great Britain	85
8	Sweden	81
9	Romania	76.5

- Great Britain & NI, Sweden & Romania all relegated to League 1.
- Belarus & Greece, both promoted from League 1 for the 2007 cup.

Relegation to 1st League

== Men's results ==
=== 100 metres ===
28 June
Wind: +2.6 m/s

Rank	Name	Nationality	Time	Notes	Points
1	Ronald Pognon	France	10.13		9
2	Dwain Chambers	Great Britain	10.19		8
3	Andrey Yepishin	Russia	10.19		7
4	Ángel David Rodríguez	Spain	10.24		6
5	Ronny Ostwald	Germany	10.29		5
6	Simone Collio	Italy	10.30		4
7	Dariusz Kuć	Poland	10.30		3
8	Anatoliy Dovhal	Ukraine	10.32		2
9	Nghi Tran	Finland	10.43		1

=== 200 metres ===
29 June
Wind: +1.8 m/s

Rank	Name	Nationality	Time	Notes	Points
1	Christian Malcolm	Great Britain	20.29	SB	9
2	Ronald Pognon	France	20.37	SB	8
3	Marcin Urbaś	Poland	20.55	SB	7
4	Ivan Teplykh	Russia	20.85		6
5	Josué Mena	Spain	20.85	SB	5
6	Visa Hongisto	Finland	20.99	SB	4
7	Francesco Scuderi	Italy	21.03		3
8	Dmytro Hlushchenko	Ukraine	21.12		2
9	Tobias Unger	Germany	21.17		1

=== 400 metres ===
28 June

Rank	Name	Nationality	Time	Notes	Points
1	Marc Raquil	France	45.89		9
2	Vladislav Frolov	Russia	46.13		8
3	Daniel Dąbrowski	Poland	46.37		7
4	Claudio Licciardello	Italy	46.43		6
5	Graham Hedman	Great Britain	46.79		5
6	Sebastian Gatzka	Germany	46.83		4
7	Yevheniy Zyukov	Ukraine	47.42		3
8	David Testa	Spain	47.70		2
9	Antti Toivonen	Finland	48.57		1

=== 800 metres ===
29 June

Rank	Name	Nationality	Time	Notes	Points
1	Juan de Dios Jurado	Spain	1:46.00		9
2	Ivan Heshko	Ukraine	1:46.24		8
3	Florent Lacasse	France	1:46.44		7
4	Dmitry Bogdanov	Russia	1:46.66		6
5	Grzegorz Krzosek	Poland	1:47.20		5
6	René Herms	Germany	1:47.53		4
7	Richard Hill	Great Britain	1:47.59		3
8	Andrea Longo	Italy	1:48.29		2
9	Mikko Lahtio	Finland	1:49.19		1

=== 1500 metres ===
28 June

Rank	Name	Nationality	Time	Notes	Points
1	Ivan Heshko	Ukraine	3:50.34		9
2	Juan Carlos Higuero	Spain	3:50.85		8
3	Aleksandr Krivchonkov	Russia	3:51.96		7
4	Mirosław Formela	Poland	3:52.03		6
5	Stefan Eberhardt	Germany	3:52.03		5
6	Andy Baddeley	Great Britain	3:52.27		4
7	Christian Obrist	Italy	3:52.52		3
8	Mahiedine Mekhissi-Benabbad	France	3:53.66		2
9	Jonas Hamm	Finland	3:57.89		1

=== 3000 metres ===
29 June

Rank	Name	Nationality	Time	Notes	Points
1	Sergio Gallardo	Spain	8:27.78	SB	9
2	Mohamed Farah	Great Britain	8:27.91		8
3	Driss Maazouzi	France	8:28.64		7
4	Jan Fitschen	Germany	8:30.12		6
5	Serhiy Lebid	Ukraine	8:30.80		5
6	Sergey Ivanov	Russia	8:31.12		4
7	Yared Shegumo	Poland	8:31.61	SB	3
8	Cosimo Caliandro	Italy	8:32.35	SB	2
9	Jonas Hamm	Finland	8:36.67	SB	1

=== 5000 metres ===
28 June

Rank	Name	Nationality	Time	Notes	Points
1	Serhiy Lebid	Ukraine	14:16.83		9
2	Juan Carlos de la Ossa	Spain	14:17.65		8
3	Sergey Ivanov	Russia	14:18.14		7
4	Khalid Zoubaa	France	14:19.45		6
5	Chris Thompson	Great Britain	14:20.26		5
6	Arne Gabius	Germany	14:25.33		4
7	Stefano La Rosa	Italy	14:31.76		3
8	Michał Kaczmarek	Poland	14:51.61		2
9	Jussi Utriainen	Finland	14:59.92		1

=== 110 metres hurdles ===
29 June
Wind: -1.5 m/s

Rank	Name	Nationality	Time	Notes	Points
1	Ladji Doucouré	France	13.27		9
2	Andy Turner	Great Britain	13.47		8
3	Igor Peremota	Russia	13.50		7
4	Serhiy Demydyuk	Ukraine	13.61		6
5	Thomas Blaschek	Germany	13.67		5
6	Artur Kohutek	Poland	13.84		4
7	Felipe Vivancos	Spain	13.88		3
8	Andrea Giaconi	Italy	13.92		2
9	Marko Ritola	Finland	13.95		1

=== 400 metres hurdles ===
28 June

Rank	Name	Nationality	Time	Notes	Points
1	Naman Keïta	France	50.20		9
2	Aleksandr Derevyagin	Russia	50.35		8
3	Gianni Carabelli	Italy	50.45		7
4	Rhys Williams	Great Britain	50.61		6
5	Eduardo Iván Rodríguez	Spain	51.29		5
6	Ari-Pekka Lattu	Finland	51.83		4
7	Jan Schneider	Germany	51.92		3
8	Stanislav Melnykov	Ukraine	52.42		2
9	Marek Motyka	Poland	52.93		1

=== 3000 metres steeplechase ===
29 June

Rank	Name	Nationality	Time	Notes	Points
1	Antonio David Jiménez	Spain	8:25.59		9
2	Vincent Le Dauphin	France	8:28.77		8
3	Jukka Keskisalo	Finland	8:30.45		7
4	Vadym Slobodenyuk	Ukraine	8:33.70		6
5	Adam Bowden	Great Britain	8:34.23		5
6	Filmon Ghirmai	Germany	8:35.36		4
7	Andrey Kozhevnikov	Russia	8:36.00		3
8	Radosław Popławski	Poland	8:37.30		2
9	Yuri Floriani	Italy	8:54.85		1

=== 4 × 100 metres relay ===
28 June

Rank	Nation	Athletes	Time	Note	Points
1	Poland	Dariusz Kuć, Łukasz Chyła, Marcin Jędrusiński, Marcin Urbaś	39.07		9
2	Italy	Luca Verdecchia, Stefano Anceschi, Massimiliano Donati, Francesco Scuderi	39.14		8
3	Great Britain	Tim Abeyie, Marlon Devonish, Christian Malcolm, Harry Aikines-Aryeetey	39.31		7
4	Russia	Mikhail Yegorychev, Ivan Teplykh, Roman Smirnov, Andrey Yepishin	39.48		6
5	Ukraine	Roman Bublyk, Kostyantyn Vasyukov, Anatoliy Dovhal, Dmytro Hlushchenko	39.53		5
6	Spain	Álvaro Aljarilla, Ángel David Rodríguez, Josué Mena, Cecilio Maestra	39.73		4
7	Germany	Marius Broening, Tobias Unger, Sebastian Ernst, Ronny Ostwald	40.05		3
8	Finland	Timo Salonen, Nghi Tran, Jarkko Ruostekivi, Visa Hongisto	40.30		2
	France	Ladji Doucouré, David Alerte, Manuel Reynaert, Dimitri Demonière	DQ		0

=== 4 × 400 metres relay ===
29 June

Rank	Nation	Athletes	Time	Note	Points
1	France	Leslie Djhone, Brice Panel, Naman Keïta, Marc Raquil	3:03.59		9
2	Poland	Rafał Wieruszewski, Piotr Klimczak, Marcin Marciniszyn, Daniel Dąbrowski	3:03.86		8
3	Italy	Andrew Howe, Gianni Carabelli, Luca Galletti, Andrea Barberi	3:04.27	SB	7
4	Great Britain	Robert Tobin, Andrew Steele, Richard Strachan, Graham Hedman	3:05.05		6
5	Ukraine	Oleksiy Rachkovsky, Myhaylo Knysh, Andriy Tverdostup, Yevheniy Zyukov	3:05.10		5
6	Germany	Sebastian Gatzka, Kamghe Gaba, Florian Seitz, René Herms	3:06.91		4
7	Spain	Eduardo Iván Rodríguez, Santiago Ezquerro, David Testa, Salvador Rodríguez	3:07.09		3
8	Russia	Konstantin Svechkar, Dmitriy Forshev, Aleksandr Larin, Vladislav Frolov	3:08.41		2
9	Finland	Ari Kauppinen, Antti Toivonen, Matti Välimäki, Jouni Haatainen	3:11.95	SB	1

=== High jump ===
28 June

Rank	Name	Nationality	2.10	2.15	2.20	2.25	2.27	2.29	2.31	2.33	2.35	Result	Notes	Points
1	Andrey Silnov	Russia	–	o	o	–	o	o	xo	–	xxx	2.31		9
2	Giulio Ciotti	Italy	o	o	o	o	xo	o	xx–	x		2.29		8
3	Germaine Mason	Great Britain	xo	o	o	xo	xxo	xxx				2.27		7
4	Aleksander Waleriańczyk	Poland	o	o	xxo	xxo	xxo	xx–	x			2.27	SB	6
5	Oskari Frösén	Finland	–	o	o	o	xxx					2.25		5
6	Oleksandr Nartov	Ukraine	o	xxo	xo	xo	xxx					2.25	SB	4
7	Eike Onnen	Germany	o	o	xxo	xxx						2.20		2.5
7	Javier Bermejo	Germany	o	o	xxo	x						2.20	SB	2.5
9	Mickaël Hanany	France	xo	xo	xxo	xxx						2.20		1

=== Pole vault ===
29 June

Rank	Name	Nationality	5.15	5.25	5.35	5.45	5.55	5.60	5.65	5.70	5.75	5.81	Result	Notes	Points
1	Romain Mesnil	France	–	o	–	xo	–	o	xx–	o	–	xxx	5.70		9
2	Giuseppe Gibilisco	Italy	–	–	–	o	–	xx–	o	–	xxx		5.65		8
3	Mikko Latvala	Finland	–	–	xo	o	xxx						5.45	SB	7
4	Igor Pavlov	Russia	–	xxo	–	o	xxx						5.45		6
5	Denys Yurchenko	Ukraine	–	–	xo	–	xxx						5.35		4
5	Przemysław Czerwiński	Poland	–	–	xo	–	xxx						5.35		4
5	Steven Lewis	Great Britain	o	–	xo	–	xxx						5.35		4
8	Javier Gazol	Spain	xo	o	xo	xxx							5.35		2
	Lars Börgeling	Germany	–	–	–	–	xxx						NM		0

=== Long jump ===
28 June

Rank	Name	Nationality	#1	#2	#3	#4	Result	Notes	Points
1	Andrew Howe	Italy	7.70	8.16	8.29	8.04	8.29		9
2	Salim Sdiri	France	7.92	8.15	7.72	7.88	8.15		8
3	Marcin Starzak	Poland	x	7.79	7.91	8.09	8.09	SB	7
4	Oleksiy Lukashevych	Ukraine	7.72	7.86	7.87	8.06	8.06		6
5	Dmitriy Sapinskiy	Russia	x	7.31	x	7.82	7.82		5
6	Oliver Koenig	Germany	7.70w	7.47	7.52	x	7.70w		4
7	Alberto Sanz	Spain	7.37	7.64	7.64	x	7.64		3
8	Kenneth Kastrén	Finland	6.81	7.50	x	–	7.50		2
9	Greg Rutherford	Great Britain	5.98	x	5.74	x	5.98		1

=== Triple jump ===
29 June

Rank	Name	Nationality	#1	#2	#3	#4	Result	Notes	Points
1	Fabrizio Donato	Italy	16.67	16.75	16.99	16.84	16.99		9
2	Viktor Yastrebov	Ukraine	16.59	16.76	16.91	16.72	16.91		8
3	Julien Kapek	France	x	15.76	16.70	16.80	16.80		7
4	Nathan Douglas	Great Britain	16.62	15.30	x	15.16w	16.62		6
5	Thomas Moede	Germany	15.97	15.99	x	15.77	15.99		5
6	Jacek Kazimierowski	Poland	15.91	x	x	x	15.91		4
7	Johan Meriluoto	Finland	14.79	15.74	x	15.74	15.74		3
8	Pere Joseph	Spain	x	15.29	13.66	x	15.29		2
	Danil Burkenya	Russia	x	r			NM		0

=== Shot put ===
28 June

Rank	Name	Nationality	#1	#2	#3	#4	Result	Notes	Points
1	Pavel Sofin	Russia	20.24	x	19.94	20.59	20.59	SB	9
2	Manuel Martínez	Spain	20.58	20.12	20.21	20.49	20.58	SB	8
3	Ralf Bartels	Germany	x	20.43	20.28	x	20.43		7
4	Carl Myerscough	Great Britain	19.39	20.23	x	x	20.23	SB	6
	Yuriy Bilonoh	Ukraine	~~19.23~~	~~20.08~~	~~20.15~~	~~x~~	~~20.15~~	DQ, doping	0
5	Tomasz Majewski	Poland	x	19.83	19.64	x	19.83		5
6	Mika Vasara	Finland	19.18	19.53	19.32	x	19.53		4
7	Gaëtan Bucki	France	18.90	18.93	18.49	18.54	18.93		3
8	Marco Dodoni	Italy	18.47	18.45	x	x	18.47		2

=== Discus throw ===
29 June

Rank	Name	Nationality	#1	#2	#3	#4	Result	Notes	Points
1	Piotr Małachowski	Poland	65.56	x	63.58	66.21	66.21	NR	9
2	Lars Riedel	Germany	63.47	62.22	60.56	63.28	63.47		8
3	Mario Pestano	Spain	57.68	62.35	62.22	61.10	62.35		7
4	Hannes Kirchler	Italy	61.79	59.07	61.82	61.88	61.88		6
5	Carl Myerscough	Great Britain	61.11	59.16	59.98	x	61.11	SB	5
6	Mikko Kyyrö	Finland	60.66	58.78	58.49	60.70	60.70		4
7	Bogdan Pishchalnikov	Russia	59.69	60.44	57.41	60.59	60.59		3
8	Jean-Claude Retel	France	59.68	60.30	57.03	59.80	60.30		2
9	Serhiy Pruhlo	Ukraine	58.69	58.62	x	x	58.69		1

=== Hammer throw ===
28 June

Rank	Name	Nationality	#1	#2	#3	#4	Result	Notes	Points
1	Szymon Ziółkowski	Poland	76.83	77.20	78.91	79.31	79.31		9
2	Andriy Skvaruk	Ukraine	76.83	78.46	78.35	78.71	78.71	SB	8
3	Olli-Pekka Karjalainen	Finland	77.04	77.08	x	74.91	77.08		7
4	Markus Esser	Germany	71.14	75.32	76.87	77.05	77.05		6
5	Vadim Khersontsev	Russia	72.12	72.93	73.53	76.35	76.35		5
6	Christophe Épalle	France	70.50	x	73.48	73.28	73.48		4
7	Nicola Vizzoni	Italy	73.03	x	73.33	x	73.33		3
8	Andy Frost	Great Britain	65.53	x	69.95	68.78	69.95		2
9	Moisés Campeny	Spain	63.82	66.76	66.53	65.51	66.76		1

=== Javelin throw ===
29 June

Rank	Name	Nationality	#1	#2	#3	#4	Result	Notes	Points
1	Tero Pitkämäki	Finland	80.49	78.39	85.30	x	85.30		9
2	Sergey Makarov	Russia	81.55	82.43	79.52	x	82.43		8
3	Igor Janik	Poland	78.03	76.43	79.30	79.27	79.30		7
4	Stefan Wenk	Germany	74.69	x	76.98	74.18	76.98		6
5	Roman Avramenko	Ukraine	73.91	x	73.94	71.22	73.94		5
6	Nick Nieland	Great Britain	73.26	x	x	x	73.26		4
7	Gustavo Dacal	Spain	x	72.20	72.16	x	72.20		3
8	Berenguer Demerval	France	72.11	70.20	69.57	67.97	72.11		2
9	Francesco Pignata	Italy	71.45	x	70.86	69.27	71.45		1

== Women's results ==
=== 100 metres ===
28 June
Wind: +2.4 m/s

Rank	Name	Nationality	Time	Notes	Points
1	Yuliya Gushchina	Russia	11.13		9
2	Joice Maduaka	Great Britain	11.29		8
3	Fabienne Béret-Martinel	France	11.35		7
4	Glory Alozie	Spain	11.40		6
5	Marion Wagner	Germany	11.43		5
6	Yelena Chebanu	Ukraine	11.46		4
7	Jenny Kallur	Sweden	11.49		3
8	Daria Onyśko	Poland	11.53		2
9	Viorica Țigău	Romania	11.83		1

=== 200 metres ===
29 June
Wind: +0.6 m/s

Rank	Name	Nationality	Time	Notes	Points
1	Olga Zaytseva	Russia	22.73		9
2	Angela Moroșanu	Romania	22.91	PB	8
3	Monika Bejnar	Poland	22.97		7
4	Yelena Chebanu	Ukraine	22.97	PB	6
5	Emma Green	Sweden	23.02	PB	5
6	Birgit Rockmeier	Germany	23.03		4
7	Abi Oyepitan	Great Britain	23.06	SB	3
8	Fabienne Béret-Martinel	France	23.28		2
9	Belén Recio	Spain	23.39	PB	1

=== 400 metres ===
28 June

Rank	Name	Nationality	Time	Notes	Points
1	Svetlana Pospelova	Russia	50.77		9
2	Nicola Sanders	Great Britain	51.92		8
3	Claudia Hoffmann	Germany	52.81		7
4	Nataliya Pyhyda	Ukraine	53.27		6
5	Zuzanna Radecka	Poland	53.32		5
6	Beatrice Dahlgren	Sweden	54.20		4
7	Phara Anacharsis	France	54.24		3
8	Maria Rus	Romania	54.93	SB	2
9	Laia Forcadell	Spain	54.97		1

=== 800 metres ===
28 June

Rank	Name	Nationality	Time	Notes	Points
1	Svetlana Klyuka	Russia	2:01.99		9
2	Monika Gradzki	Germany	2:04.13		8
3	Mayte Martínez	Spain	2:04.16		7
4	Aneta Lemiesz	Poland	2:04.21		6
5	Virginie Fouquet	France	2:04.90		5
6	Mihaela Neacşu	Romania	2:07.09		4
7	Therese Ahlepil	Sweden	2:08.13		3
8	Becky Lyne	Great Britain	2:11.04		2
	Tetyana Petlyuk	Ukraine	DNF		0

=== 1500 metres ===
29 June

Rank	Name	Nationality	Time	Notes	Points
1	Yuliya Chizhenko	Russia	4:14.39		9
2	Latifa Essarokh	France	4:14.76		8
3	Nataliya Tobias	Ukraine	4:15.36		7
4	Corina Dumbrăvean	Romania	4:16.68		6
5	Anna Jakubczak	Poland	4:17.09		5
6	Antje Möldner	Germany	4:17.95		4
7	Lisa Dobriskey	Great Britain	4:18.13		3
8	Irene Alfonso	Spain	4:19.68		2
9	Flo Jonsson	Sweden	4:20.91		1

=== 3000 metres ===
28 June

Rank	Name	Nationality	Time	Notes	Points
1	Jo Pavey	Great Britain	8:52.54		9
2	Olesya Syreva	Russia	8:58.27	SB	8
3	Justyna Lesman	Poland	9:02.64		7
4	Sabrina Mockenhaupt	Germany	9:05.20		6
5	Hana Farhoun	France	9:08.32	PB	5
6	Tetyana Holovchenko	Ukraine	9:15.09		4
7	Sonia Bejarano	Spain	9:30.07	SB	3
8	Corina Dumbrăvean	Romania	9:39.26	PB	2
9	Anneli Fransson	Sweden	9:45.74		1

=== 5000 metres ===
29 June

Rank	Name	Nationality	Time	Notes	Points
1	Liliya Shobukhova	Russia	16:18.23		9
2	Marta Domínguez	Spain	16:25.21		8
3	Nataliya Berkut	Ukraine	16:26.12		7
4	Lidia Chojecka	Poland	16:28.47		6
5	Irina Mikitenko	Germany	16:30.89		5
6	Kathy Butler	Great Britain	16:34.75	SB	4
7	Christelle Daunay	France	16:42.60		3
8	Adriana Nelson	Romania	16:50.00		2
9	Christin Johansson	Sweden	16:50.80	SB	1

=== 100 metres hurdles ===
29 June
Wind: +0.8 m/s

Rank	Name	Nationality	Time	Notes	Points
1	Susanna Kallur	Sweden	12.69		9
2	Kirsten Bolm	Germany	12.74		8
3	Adrianna Lamalle	France	12.90		7
4	Sarah Claxton	Great Britain	13.01		6
5	Glory Alozie	Spain	13.04		5
6	Yevheniya Snihur	Ukraine	13.08		4
7	Irina Matyushkova	Russia	13.11		3
8	Viorica Țigău	Romania	13.36		2
9	Kaja Tokarska	Poland	13.69		1

=== 400 metres hurdles ===
28 June

Rank	Name	Nationality	Time	Notes	Points
1	Tasha Danvers Smith	Great Britain	55.65		9
2	Yevgeniya Isakova	Russia	55.82		8
3	Tetyana Tereshchuk-Antipova	Ukraine	55.87		7
4	Angela Moroșanu	Romania	55.99		6
5	Anna Jesień	Poland	56.74		5
6	Erica Mårtensson	Sweden	57.68		4
7	Cora Olivero	Spain	57.94		3
8	Aurore Kassambara	France	58.12		2
9	Claudia Marx	Germany	58.72		1

=== 3000 metressteeplechase ===
28 June

Rank	Name	Nationality	Time	Notes	Points
1	Yelena Sidorchenkova	Russia	9:45.73		9
2	Rosa Morató	Spain	9:49.81		8
3	Katarzyna Kowalska	Poland	9:56.10		7
4	Élodie Olivarès	France	9:57.15		6
5	Ida Nilsson	Sweden	10:04.78		5
6	Cristina Casandra	Romania	10:08.08		4
7	Tina Brown	Great Britain	10:28.26		3
8	Yuliya Ihnatova	Ukraine	10:30.60		2
9	Birte Schütz	Germany	10:50.03		1

=== 4 × 100 metres relay ===
28 June

Rank	Nation	Athletes	Time	Note	Points
1	Russia	Natalya Rusakova, Yuliya Gushchina, Yekaterina Kondratyeva, Larisa Kruglova	43.71		9
2	France	Adrianna Lamalle, Fabienne Béret-Martinel, Céline Distel-Bonnet, Carima Louami	43.75		8
3	Ukraine	Olena Chebanu, Olena Sinyavina, Iryna Shtanhyeyeva, Oksana Shcherbak	43.86		7
4	Sweden	Emma Rienas, Susanna Kallur, Jenny Kallur, Emma Green	44.53		6
5	Spain	Ruth Conde, Belén Recio, Claudia Troppa, Glory Alozie	44.87		5
6	Poland	Iwona Dorobisz, Daria Onyśko, Dorota Dydo, Joanna Gabryelewicz	44.90		4
	Great Britain	Abi Oyepitan, Joice Maduaka, Laura Turner, Jeanette Kwakye	DQ		0
	Germany	Katja Wakan, Marion Wagner, Birgit Rockmeier, Verena Sailer	DQ		0
	Romania	Viorica Țigău, Angela Moroșanu, Andreea Ogrăzeanu, Livia Pruteanu	DNF		0

=== 4 × 400 metres relay ===
29 June

Rank	Nation	Athletes	Time	Note	Points
1	Russia	Yelena Migunova, Olga Zaytseva, Tatyana Veshkurova, Natalya Antyukh	3:23.51		9
2	Poland	Zuzanna Radecka, Monika Bejnar, Małgorzata Pskit, Grażyna Prokopek	3:26.60	SB	8
3	Great Britain	Helen Karagounis, Nicola Sanders, Melanie Purkiss, Lee McConnell	3:26.98	SB	7
4	Germany	Korinna Fink, Anja Pollmächer, Claudia Marx, Claudia Hoffmann	3:28.86		6
5	Ukraine	Kseniya Karandyuk, Oksana Ilyushkina, Oksana Shcherbak, Nataliya Pyhyda	3:32.87		5
6	France	Virginie Michanol, Thélia Sigère, Aurore Kassambara, Phara Anacharsis	3:32.95		4
7	Sweden	Beatrice Dahlgren, Emma Björkman, Emma Agerbjer, Lena Aruhn	3:34.81		3
8	Romania	Iuliana Popescu, Mihaela Neacşu, Alina Rîpanu, Angela Moroșanu	3:35.41	SB	2
9	Spain	Belén Recio, Cora Olivero, Laia Forcadell, Begoña Garrido	3:37.07	SB	1

=== High jump ===
29 June

Rank	Name	Nationality	1.70	1.75	1.80	1.85	1.89	1.92	1.95	1.97	1.99	Result	Notes	Points
1	Kajsa Bergqvist	Russia	–	–	–	o	o	xo	xo	xo	xxx	1.97		9
2	Ruth Beitia	Spain	–	o	o	o	o	xo	xo	xx–	x	1.95		8
3	Anna Chicherova	Russia	–	–	o	o	o	o	xxx			1.92		7
4	Iryna Kovalenko	Ukraine	–	o	o	o	o	xxx				1.89		6
5	Julia Hartmann	Germany	–	o	o	o	xo	xxx				1.89		5
6	Melanie Skotnik	France	–	–	o	xo	xxo	xxx				1.89		4
7	Julie Crane	Great Britain	–	o	o	o	xxx					1.85		3
8	Marta Borkowska	Poland	o	o	o	xxx						1.80		1.5
8	Oana Pantelimon	Romania	–	–	o	xxx						1.80		1.5

=== Pole vault ===
28 June

Rank	Name	Nationality	3.90	4.10	4.20	4.30	4.40	4.50	4.55	4.60	4.65	4.70	4.75	4.80	4.85	Result	Notes	Points
1	Monika Pyrek	Poland	–	–	–	o	–	xo	o	o	o	xxo	xo	–	xxx	4.75	CR, SB	9
2	Vanessa Boslak	France	–	xo	–	o	–	o	–	xo	–	xo	xx–	x		4.70	NR	8
3	Nastja Ryshich	Germany	–	o	–	o	–	xxo	o	xx–	x					4.55		7
4	Naroa Agirre	Spain	o	o	o	o	xxo	xxo	xxx							4.50	NR	6
5	Kate Dennison	Great Britain	o	o	–	xxx										4.10		5
6	Linda Persson	Sweden	xo	xxo	xxx											4.10		4
7	Lyudmyla Vaylenko	Ukraine	o	xxx												3.90		3
	Svetlana Feofanova	Russia	–	–	–	–	xxx									NM		0
		Romania														DNS		0

=== Long jump ===
29 June

Rank	Name	Nationality	#1	#2	#3	#4	Result	Notes	Points
	Tatyana Kotova	Russia	~~6.31~~	~~6.67~~	~~6.39~~	~~6.34~~	~~6.67~~	DQ, doping	0
1	Eunice Barber	France	6.56	6.43	6.31	6.61	6.61	SB	9
2	Daniela Lincoln-Saavedra	Sweden	x	6.41	6.47	6.55	6.55		8
3	Adina Anton	Romania	6.51	6.05	6.30	x	6.51		7
4	Kelly Sotherton	Great Britain	x	6.50	6.39	6.43	6.50		6
5	Małgorzata Trybańska	Poland	6.24	x	6.49	6.40	6.49		5
6	Viktoriya Molchanova	Ukraine	6.15	6.22	6.47	x	6.47		4
7	Concepción Montaner	Spain	6.10	6.35	6.26	6.31	6.35		3
8	Claudia Tonn	Germany	6.08	x	6.19	6.14	6.19		2

=== Triple jump ===
28 June

Rank	Name	Nationality	#1	#2	#3	#4	Result	Notes	Points
1	Olha Saladukha	Ukraine	13.80	13.72	14.10	12.01	14.10		9
2	Viktoriya Valyukevich	Russia	14.06	x	x	14.03	14.06		8
3	Adelina Gavrilă	Romania	13.85	14.00	13.75	13.63	14.00		7
4	Camilla Johansson	Sweden	13.31	13.57	13.26	13.75	13.75		6
5	Carlota Castrejana	Spain	13.68	x	x	x	13.68		5
6	Aleksandra Fila	Poland	12.68	13.49	13.08	13.65	13.65		4
7	Teresa Nzola Meso Ba	France	13.05	13.02	13.17	13.24	13.24		3
8	Katja Pobanz	Germany	12.57	12.99	12.87	x	12.99		2
9	Nadia Williams	Great Britain	11.89	12.52	12.55	12.55	12.55		1

=== Shot put ===
29 June

Rank	Name	Nationality	#1	#2	#3	#4	Result	Notes	Points
1	Petra Lammert	Germany	18.80	x	18.67	19.36	19.36		9
2	Irina Khudoroshkina	Russia	17.44	18.29	16.28	18.16	18.29		8
3	Krystyna Zabawska	Poland	17.78	17.64	x	x	17.78		7
4	Laurence Manfrédi	France	16.39	x	16.85	16.81	16.85		6
5	Martina de la Puente	Spain	15.85	15.97	x	16.57	16.57		5
6	Tetyana Nasonova	Ukraine	16.55	x	16.37	x	16.55		4
7	Jo Duncan	Great Britain	16.48	16.15	x	15.60	16.48		3
8	Anca Heltne	Romania	15.85	15.72	15.92	16.17	16.17		2
9	Helena Engman	Sweden	x	15.88	15.65	16.04	16.04		1

=== Discus throw ===
28 June

Rank	Name	Nationality	#1	#2	#3	#4	Result	Notes	Points
1	Franka Dietzsch	Germany	x	63.83	65.54	63.20	65.54		9
2	Darya Pishchalnikova	Russia	58.10	60.14	58.14	64.24	64.24		8
3	Nicoleta Grasu	Romania	57.97	61.91	61.07	60.86	61.91		7
4	Wioletta Potępa	Poland	59.80	x	60.94	x	60.94		6
5	Anna Söderberg	Sweden	59.14	58.94	60.68	x	60.68		5
6	Olena Antonova	Ukraine	58.93	x	59.60	56.74	59.60		4
7	Mélina Robert-Michon	France	55.56	54.23	x	51.40	55.56		3
8	Irache Quintanal	Spain	52.52	52.68	x	x	52.68		2
9	Zoe Derham	Great Britain	x	26.02	–	–	26.02	PB	1

=== Hammer throw ===
29 June

Rank	Name	Nationality	#1	#2	#3	#4	Result	Notes	Points
1	Tatyana Lysenko	Russia	74.50	76.50	75.34	x	76.50	CR	9
2	Kamila Skolimowska	Poland	68.16	x	x	x	68.16		8
3	Iryna Sekachyova	Ukraine	x	x	x	67.96	67.96		7
4	Mihaela Melinte	Romania	67.25	63.97	66.87	62.66	67.25		6
5	Berta Castells	Spain	64.26	60.23	64.70	65.93	65.93		5
6	Amélie Perrin	France	61.12	65.23	65.80	x	65.80		4
7	Cecilia Nilsson	Sweden	64.36	x	63.48	x	64.36		3
8	Zoe Derham	Great Britain	x	12.37	61.62	x	61.62		2
	Betty Heidler	Germany	x	x	x	x	NM		0

=== Javelin throw ===
28 June

Rank	Name	Nationality	#1	#2	#3	#4	Result	Notes	Points
1	Barbara Madejczyk	Poland	60.35	60.47	62.90	64.08	64.08	NR	9
2	Felicia Moldovan	Romania	60.49	x	x	x	60.49		8
3	Mercedes Chilla	Spain	57.41	58.76	x	60.22	60.22		7
4	Lada Chernova	Russia	59.00	59.87	x	x	59.87		6
5	Annika Suthe	Germany	55.89	59.27	x	x	59.27		5
6	Olha Ivankova	Ukraine	57.30	51.59	56.36	58.70	58.70		4
7	Goldie Sayers	Great Britain	55.29	56.75	x	56.63	56.75		3
8	Sarah Walter	France	x	56.70	56.71	56.06	56.71		2
9	Annika Petersson	Sweden	56.08	52.36	52.54	53.31	56.08	SB	1
