= Great Britain at the 2006 European Athletics Championships =

Sporting event delegation

Great Britain and Northern Ireland at the 2006 European Athletics Championships
- WA code: GBR
- National federation: UKA
- Website: www.britishathletics.org.uk

in Gothenburg
- Medals Ranked 11th: Gold 1 Silver 5 Bronze 5 Total 11

European Athletics Championships appearances
- 1934; 1938; 1946; 1950; 1954; 1958; 1962; 1966; 1969; 1971; 1974; 1978; 1982; 1986; 1990; 1994; 1998; 2002; 2006; 2010; 2012; 2014; 2016; 2018; 2022; 2024; 2026

Great Britain and Northern Ireland competed at the 2006 European Athletics Championships held in Gothenburg from 7 August to 13 August 2006. Christine Ohuruogu was selected for the Women's 400m but was subsequently banned by UK Athletics for missing drug tests and did not compete.

== Medals ==
| Medal | Name | Event | Date |
|---|---|---|---|
| 1st place, gold medalist(s) | Darren Campbell; Dwain Chambers; Marlon Devonish; Mark Lewis-Francis | Men's 4 × 100 m relay | 13 August |
| 2nd place, silver medalist(s) | Greg Rutherford | Men's Long jump | 8 August |
| 2nd place, silver medalist(s) | Nathan Douglas | Men's Triple jump | 12 August |
| 2nd place, silver medalist(s) | Mo Farah | Men's 5000 m | 13 August |
| 2nd place, silver medalist(s) | Tim Benjamin; Graham Hedman; Robert Tobin; Rhys Williams | Men's 4 × 400 m relay | 13 August |
| 2nd place, silver medalist(s) | Emma Ania; Emily Freeman; Joice Maduaka; Anyika Onuora; Laura Turner | Women's 4 × 100 m relay | 13 August |
| 3rd place, bronze medalist(s) | Marlon Devonish | Men's 200 m | 10 August |
| 3rd place, bronze medalist(s) | Rebecca Lyne | Women's 800 m | 10 August |
| 3rd place, bronze medalist(s) | Rhys Williams | Men's 400 m hurdles | 10 August |
| 3rd place, bronze medalist(s) | Andy Turner | Men's 110 m hurdles | 12 August |
| 3rd place, bronze medalist(s) | Sam Ellis | Men's 800 m | 13 August |

== Results ==
Great Britain and Northern Ireland entered the following athletes.

Key

- Q = Qualified for the next round
- q = Qualified for the next round as a fastest loser or, in field events, by position without achieving the qualifying target
- NR = National record
- PB = Personal best
- SB = Season best
- N/A = Round not applicable for the event

=== Men ===
Track and road events

| Athlete | Event | Heat | | Quarterfinal | | Semifinal | | Final | |
| Athlete | Event | Result | Rank | Result | Rank | Result | Rank | Result | Rank |
|---|---|---|---|---|---|---|---|---|---|
| Dwain Chambers | 100 m | 10.24 | 1 Q | 10.39 | 4 Q | 10.25 | 4 Q | 10.24 | 7 |
| Tyrone Edgar | 100 m | 10.32 | 1 Q | 10.51 | 5 | Did not advance | | | |
| Mark Lewis-Francis | 100 m | 10.37 | 1 Q | 10.33 | 2 Q | 10.30 | 3 Q | 10.16 | 5 |
| Tim Abeyie | 200 m | 21.03 | 4 Q | 21.17 | 7 | Did not advance | | | |
| Marlon Devonish | 200 m | 20.54 | 1 Q | 20.67 | 1 Q | 20.60 | 1 Q | 20.54 | 3rd place, bronze medalist(s) |
| Rikki Fifton | 200 m | 21.02 | 3 Q | 20.72 | 2 Q | 20.85 | 6 | Did not advance | |
| Tim Benjamin | 400 m | 46.10 | 1 Q | —N/a | | 45.67 | 4 Q | 45.89 | 6 |
| Graham Hedman | 400 m | 46.02 | 3 Q | —N/a | | 45.90 | 6 | Did not advance | |
| Robert Tobin | 400 m | 46.10 | 5 q | —N/a | | 46.03 | 6 | Did not advance | |
| Sam Ellis | 800 m | 1:47.72 | 4 q | —N/a | | 1:49.23 | 3 Q | 1:46.64 | 3rd place, bronze medalist(s) |
| Richard Hill | 800 m | 1:50.26 | 6 | —N/a | | Did not advance | | | |
| Michael Rimmer | 800 m | 1:47.10 | 1 Q | —N/a | | 1:47.82 | 5 q | 1:47.66 | 8 |
| Andrew Baddeley | 1500 m | 3:41.92 | 7 q | —N/a | | | | 3:42.31 | 6 |
| Stephen Davies | 1500 m | 3:48.64 | 11 | —N/a | | | | Did not advance | |
| Michael East | 1500 m | 4:11.89 | 15 | —N/a | | | | Did not advance | |
| Mo Farah | 5000 m | 13:46.77 | 3 Q | —N/a | | | | 13:44.79 | 2nd place, silver medalist(s) |
| Nick McCormick | 5000 m | 13:52.87 | 7 q | —N/a | | | | 14:06.18 | 12 |
| Chris Thompson | 5000 m | 14:10.27 | 11 | —N/a | | | | Did not advance | |
| Tomas Abyu | Marathon | —N/a | | | | | | 2:20:45 | 27 |
| Huw Lobb | Marathon | —N/a | | | | | | 2:17:17 | 20 |
| Peter Riley | Marathon | —N/a | | | | | | DNF | |
| Dan Robinson | Marathon | —N/a | | | | | | 2:16:06 | 16 |
| David Hughes | 110 m hurdles | 13.66 | 3 q | —N/a | | 13.87 | 8 | Did not advance | |
| Will Sharman | 110 m hurdles | 13.85 | 4 | —N/a | | Did not advance | | | |
| Andy Turner | 110 m hurdles | 13.52 | 1 Q | —N/a | | 13.36 | 3 Q | 13.52 | 3rd place, bronze medalist(s) |
| Ryan Dinham | 400 m hurdles | DSQ | | —N/a | | | | Did not advance | |
| Dai Greene | 400 m hurdles | 50.66 | 3 | —N/a | | | | Did not advance | |
| Rhys Williams | 400 m hurdles | 49.58 | 1 Q | —N/a | | | | 49.12 | 3rd place, bronze medalist(s) |
| Adam Bowden | 3000 m steeplechase | 8:35.79 | 10 | —N/a | | | | Did not advance | |
| Jermaine Mays | 3000 m steeplechase | 8:41.70 | 9 | —N/a | | | | Did not advance | |
| Darren Campbell; Dwain Chambers; Marlon Devonish; Mark Lewis-Francis | 4 × 100 m relay | 38.77 | 1 Q | —N/a | | | | 38.91 | 1st place, gold medalist(s) |
| Tim Benjamin; Graham Hedman; Robert Tobin; Rhys Williams | 4 × 400 m relay | 3:02.51 | 1 Q | —N/a | | | | 3:01.63 | 2nd place, silver medalist(s) |

Field events

| Athlete | Event | Qualification | | Final | |
| Athlete | Event | Distance | Position | Distance | Position |
|---|---|---|---|---|---|
| Martyn Bernard | High jump | 2.23 | 14 | Did not advance | |
| Germain Mason | High jump | 2.19 | 17 | Did not advance | |
| Adam Scarr | High jump | NM | | Did not advance | |
| Nathan Morgan | Long jump | 7.94 | 8 q | 7.65 | 11 |
| Greg Rutherford | Long jump | 8.07 | 4 Q | 8.13 | 2nd place, silver medalist(s) |
| Chris Tomlinson | Long jump | 7.95 | 7 Q | 7.74 | 9 |
| Larry Achike | Triple jump | 16.68 | 14 | Did not advance | |
| Nathan Douglas | Triple jump | 16.84 | 8 q | 17.21 | 2nd place, silver medalist(s) |
| Phillips Idowu | Triple jump | 17.01 | 7 Q | 17.02 | 5 |
| Carl Myerscough | Shot put | 19.52 | 12 | Did not advance | |
| Nick Nieland | Javelin throw | 80.40 | 11 q | 76.92 | 11 |

Combined Events - Decathlon

| Athlete | Event | 100 m | LJ | SP | HJ | 400 m | 110H | DT | PV | JT | 1500 m | Final | Rank |
|---|---|---|---|---|---|---|---|---|---|---|---|---|---|
| Dean Macey | Result | DNS | | | | | | | | | | —N/a | —N/a |
| Dean Macey | Points | —N/a | | | | | | | | | | —N/a | —N/a |

=== Women ===
Track and road events

| Athlete | Event | Heat | | Semifinal | | Final | |
| Athlete | Event | Result | Rank | Result | Rank | Result | Rank |
|---|---|---|---|---|---|---|---|
| Emma Ania | 100 m | 11.41 | 3 Q | 11.49 | 6 | Did not advance | |
| Joice Maduaka | 100 m | 11.24 | 1 Q | 11.32 | 1 Q | 11.24 | 4 |
| Anyika Onuora | 100 m | 11.38 | 3 Q | 11.45 | 7 | Did not advance | |
| Marilyn Okoro | 400 m | 52.02 PB | 3 Q | 52.94 | 8 | Did not advance | |
| Nicola Sanders | 400 m | 51.80 | 2 Q | 51.25 | 4 Q | 50.87 | 6 |
| Becky Lyne | 800 m | 2:01.87 | 1 Q | 1:59.11 | 2 Q | 1:58.45 | 3rd place, bronze medalist(s) |
| Amanda Pritchard | 800 m | 2:12.32 | 6 q | DNS | | Did not advance | |
| Jemma Simpson | 800 m | 2:01.55 | 3 Q | 2:01.12 | 6 | Did not advance | |
| Helen Clitheroe | 1500 m | 4:07.28 | 5 q | —N/a | | 4:09.73 | 11 |
| Lisa Dobriskey | 1500 m | 4:09.47 | 7 | —N/a | | Did not advance | |
| Rebecca Lyne | 1500 m | DNS | | —N/a | | Did not advance | |
| Jo Pavey | 5000 m | —N/a | | | | 15:01.41 | 4 |
| Kathy Butler | 10,000 m | —N/a | | | | 32:01.04 SB | 12 |
| Mara Yamauchi | 10,000 m | —N/a | | | | 32:07.90 | 13 |
| Hayley Yelling | 10,000 m | —N/a | | | | 32:12.50 SB | 15 |
| Tracey Morris | Marathon | —N/a | | | | 2:37:34 | 16 |
| Gemma Bennett | 100 m hurdles | 13.40 | 3 | Did not advance | | | |
| Sarah Claxton | 100 m hurdles | 13.39 | 3 | Did not advance | | | |
| Sara McGreavy | 100 m hurdles | 13.30 | 5 q | 13.67 | 8 | Did not advance | |
| Tasha Danvers-Smith | 400 m hurdles | 55.64 | 2 Q | 55.14 | 3 Q | 55.56 | 7 |
| Emma Duck | 400 m hurdles | 58.03 | 8 | Did not advance | | | |
| Lee McConnell | 400 m hurdles | 56.02 | 4 q | 55.61 | 5 | Did not advance | |
| Hatti Dean | 3000 m steeplechase | 9:52.97 | 8 | —N/a | | Did not advance | |
| Emma Ania; Emily Freeman; Joice Maduaka; Anyika Onuora; Laura Turner* | 4 × 100 m relay | 44.00 | 4 q | —N/a | | 43.51 | 2nd place, silver medalist(s) |
| Emma Duck; Lee McConnell; Marilyn Okoro; Nicola Sanders; Jenny Meadows* | 4 × 400 m relay | 3:27.92 | 1 Q | —N/a | | 3:28.17 | 4 |

Field events

| Athlete | Event | Qualification | | Final | |
| Athlete | Event | Distance | Position | Distance | Position |
|---|---|---|---|---|---|
| Kate Dennison | Pole vault | 4.30 | 15 | Did not advance | |
| Ellie Spain | Pole vault | 4.00 | 26 | Did not advance | |
| Jade Johnson | Long jump | DNS | | Did not advance | |
| Kelly Sotherton | Long jump | 6.40 | 15 | Did not advance | |
| Zoe Derham | Hammer throw | 56.94 | 39 | Did not advance | |
| Shirley Webb | Hammer throw | 60.30 | 34 | Did not advance | |
| Goldie Sayers | Javelin throw | 58.65 | 12 q | 54.70 | 12 |

Combined events – Heptathlon

| Athlete | Event | 100H | HJ | SP | 200 m | LJ | JT | 800 m | Final | Rank |
|---|---|---|---|---|---|---|---|---|---|---|
| Jessica Ennis | Result | 13.33 | 1.86 | 12.72 | 23.56 | 6.19 | 36.65 | 2:13.45 | 6287 | 8 |
| Jessica Ennis | Points | 1075 | 1054 | 709 | 1023 | 908 | 603 | 915 | 6287 | 8 |
| Louise Hazel | Result | 13.44 | 1.71 | 11.62 | 24.12 | 6.05 | 38.60 | 2:17.45 | 5894 | 17 |
| Louise Hazel | Points | 1059 | 867 | 636 | 969 | 865 | 640 | 858 | 5894 | 17 |
| Kelly Sotherton | Result | 13.22 | 1.77 | 14.27 | 23.57 | 6.51 | 30.05 | 2:11.98 | 6290 | 7 |
| Kelly Sotherton | Points | 1091 | 941 | 812 | 1022 | 1010 | 478 | 936 | 6290 | 7 |
