= 2008 European Cup (athletics) =

International sporting competition

- Logo of the Superleague
- Host city: Annecy, France (Super League)
- Dates: 21–22 June 2008
- Main venue: Parc des Sports (Super League)

The 29th and final SPAR European Cup took place in June 2008. Track and field events were held on 21 and 22 June 2008 at the Parc des Sports Stadium in Annecy, France. Other event venues included Estádio Dr. Magalhães Pessoa in Portugal and facilities in Istanbul, Turkey (for First League track and field events), Kadriorg Stadium in Estonia and SNP Stadium in Slovakia (for Second League track and field events), and facilities in Eindhoven, Netherlands (for diving and other water sports events). The Parc des Sports Annecy Stadium was also stadium for 1998 World Junior Championships in Athletics. It was the last edition of the European Cup which from 2009 has been replaced by European Team Championships combining the men and women competitions.

== Super League ==
=== Final standings ===
Men

Pos	Country	Pts
1	Great Britain	112
2	Poland	98
3	France	96
4	Germany	95
5	Russia	84
6	Italy	82
7	Spain	81
8	Greece	68

Women

Pos	Country	Pts
1	Russia	122
2	Ukraine	108.5
3	Great Britain	89
4	Poland	86
5	France	81
6	Italy	79.5
7	Belarus	78
8	Germany	74

=== Day 1 standings ===
Men

Pos	Country	Pts
1	Great Britain	55
2	Poland	52
3	France	52
4	Italy	46
5	Germany	45
6	Russia	37
7	Spain	37
8	Greece	35

Women

Pos	Country	Pts
1	Russia	71
2	Ukraine	58
3	Great Britain	51
4	Poland	51
5	France	42
6	Italy	42
7	Belarus	40
8	Germany	39

=== Men's results ===
Event	Gold		Silver		Bronze	
100 metres	Tyrone Edgar (GBR)	10.20	Martial Mbandjock (FRA)	10.25	Tobias Unger (GER)	10.37
200 metres	Marlon Devonish (GBR)	20.52	Anastásios Goúsis (GRE)	20.57	Alexander Kosenkow (GER)	20.61
400 metres	Martyn Rooney (GBR)	45.33	Claudio Licciardello (ITA)	45.57	Denis Alekseyev (RUS)	45.67
800 metres	Manuel Olmedo (ESP)	1:49.98	Marcin Lewandowski (POL)	1:50.13	Yuriy Koldin (RUS)	1:50.17
1500 metres	Mehdi Baala (FRA)	3:40.55	Arturo Casado (ESP)	3:40.70	Carsten Schlangen (GER)	3:41.75
3000 metres	Andy Baddeley (GBR)	8:01.28	Jesús España (ESP)	8:01.62	Sergey Ivanov (RUS)	8:01.91
5000 metres	Mohamed Farah (GBR)	13:44.07	Carles Castillejo (ESP)	13:57.37	Daniele Meucci (ITA)	14:03.04
3000 m steeplechase	Mahiedine Mekhissi-Benabbad (FRA)	8:33.10	Ildar Minshin (RUS)	8:34.89	Andrew Lemoncello (GBR)	8:36.33
100 m hurdles	Jackson Quiñónez (ESP)	13.40	Konstadínos Douvalídis (GRE)	13.59	Yevgeniy Borisov (RUS)	13.66
400 m hurdles	Periklís Iakovákis (GRE)	49.15	Marek Plawgo (POL)	49.44	Salah Ghaidi (FRA)	49.64
4 × 100 m relay	Great Britain (GBR); Christian Malcolm; Tyrone Edgar; Marlon Devonish; Rikki Fifton	38.48	Poland (POL); Dariusz Kuć; Łukasz Chyła; Kamil Masztak; Marcin Jędrusiński	38.61	Italy (ITA); Emanuele Di Gregorio; Simone Collio; Massimiliano Donati; Maurizio Checcucci	38.73
4 × 400 m relay	France (FRA); Leslie Djhone; Teddy Venel; Brice Panel; Richard Maunier	3:02.33	Great Britain (GBR); Robert Tobin; Dale Garland; Conrad Williams; Martyn Rooney	3:02.66	Germany (GER); Simon Kirch; Kamghe Gaba; Florian Seitz; Bastian Swillims	3:03.04
High jump	Andrey Silnov (RUS)	2.32 m	Andrea Bettinelli (ITA)	2.30 m	Javier Bermejo (ESP)	2.24 m
Pole vault	Danny Ecker (GER)	5.55 m	Przemysław Czerwiński (POL)	5.55 m	Steven Lewis (GBR)	5.40 m
Long jump	Loúis Tsátoumas (GRE)	8.17 m	Marcin Starzak (POL)	8.09 m	Nils Winter (GER)	8.05 m
Triple jump	Phillips Idowu (GBR)	17.46 m	Colomba Fofana (FRA)	17.21 m	Fabrizio Schembri (ITA)	17.01 m
Shot put	Peter Sack (GER)	20.41 m	Tomasz Majewski (POL)	20.32 m	Yves Niaré (FRA)	20.31 m
Discus throw	Mario Pestano (ESP)	68.34 m	Robert Harting (GER)	65.25 m	Piotr Małachowski (POL)	63.20 m
Hammer throw	Szymon Ziółkowski (POL)	79.26 m	Nicola Vizzoni (ITA)	77.32 m	Markus Esser (GER)	75.07 m
Javelin throw	Peter Esenwein (GER)	79.23 m	Laurent Dorique (FRA)	75.97 m	Igor Janik (POL)	75.65 m

=== Women's results ===
Event	Gold		Silver		Bronze	
100 metres	Yulia Nestsiarenka (BLR)	11.17	Emma Ania (GBR)	11.22	Yevgeniya Polyakova (RUS)	11.26
200 metres	Muriel Hurtis (FRA)	22.75	Christine Ohuruogu (GBR)	23.23	Natalya Rusakova (RUS)	23.29
400 metres	Nicola Sanders (GBR)	51.17	Nataliya Pyhyda (UKR)	51.57	Tatyana Veshkurova (RUS)	52.00
800 metres	Jenny Meadows (GBR)	2:01.20	Élodie Guégan (FRA)	2:01.65	Anna Rostkowska (POL)	2:01.82
1500 metres	Sylwia Ejdys (POL)	4:19.17	Nataliya Tobias (UKR)	4:19.70	Susan Scott (GBR)	4:19.83
3000 metres	Lidia Chojecka (POL)	9:03.49	Helen Clitheroe (GBR)	9:04.38	Olga Komyagina (RUS)	9:05.76
5000 metres	Nataliya Berkut (UKR)	15:23.97	Kate Reed (GBR)	15:40.73	Regina Kashayeva (RUS)	15:50.98
3000 m steeplechase	Gulnara Galkina (RUS)	9:35.32	Valentyna Zhudina (UKR)	9:35.42	Wioletta Frankiewicz (POL)	9:39.60
100 m hurdles	Yevheniya Snihur (UKR)	12.81 PB	Aurelia Trywiańska-Kollasch (POL)	12.82	Yuliya Kondakova (RUS)	12.83
400 m hurdles	Anastasiya Rabchenyuk (UKR)	54.64	Anna Jesień (POL)	54.81	Jonna Tilgner (GER)	56.15
4 × 100 m relay	Russia (RUS); Yevgeniya Polyakova; Natalya Rusakova; Yuliya Gushchina; Yuliya Chermoshanskaya	42.80	Great Britain (GBR); Anyika Onuora; Montell Douglas; Jeanette Kwakye; Emma Ania	42.95	Italy (ITA); Anita Pistone; Vincenza Calì; Giulia Arcioni; Audrey Alloh	43.04 NR
4 × 400 m relay	Russia (RUS); Yuliya Gushchina; Olesya Krasnomovets; Tatyana Veshkurova; Lyudmila Litvinova	3:23.77	France (FRA); Phara Anacharsis; Thélia Sigère; Solen Désert-Mariller; Virginie Michanol	3:26.63	Belarus (BLR); Katsiaryna Bobryk; Iryna Khliustava; Anna Kozak; Yulianna Yuschanka	3:27.13
High jump	Ariane Friedrich (GER)	2.03 m	Viktoriya Styopina (UKR) Antonietta Di Martino (ITA)	1.95 m	Not awarded	
Pole vault	Yuliya Golubchikova (RUS)	4.73 m	Anna Rogowska (POL)	4.66 m	Silke Spiegelburg (GER)	4.59 m
Long jump	Lyudmila Kolchanova (RUS)	7.04 m	Jade Johnson (GBR)	6.81 m PB	Bianca Kappler (GER)	6.63 m
Triple jump	Olha Saladukha (UKR)	14.73 m	Teresa Nzola Meso Ba (FRA)	14.51 m	Magdelín Martínez (ITA)	14.28 m
Shot put	Christina Schwanitz (GER)	18.55 m	Anna Omarova (RUS)	18.30 m	Chiara Rosa (ITA)	18.03 m
Discus throw	Svetlana Saykina (RUS)	62.56 m	Nataliya Semenova (UKR)	62.25 m	Joanna Wiśniewska (POL)	59.01 m
Hammer throw	Aksana Menkova (BLR)	75.97 m	Manuela Montebrun (FRA)	72.18 m	Iryna Novozhylova (UKR)	71.12 m
Javelin throw	Natallia Shymchuk (BLR)	63.24 m NR	Mariya Abakumova (RUS)	~~61.78 m~~	Zahra Bani (ITA)	58.13 m

- Abakumova later disqualified for doping

== First League ==
Nations of 1st League (16 teams, men and women, in two groups of equal level).

=== Group A ===
At Estádio Dr. Magalhães Pessoa, Leiria, (Portugal), on 21 & 22 June 2008.

Men's

Austria
Belgium
Belarus
Czech Republic
Finland
Netherlands
Norway
Portugal

Belgium was relegated into League 1 from Superleague 2007 and Austria & Norway are promoted into the 1st League from 2007 2nd League for 2008 European Cup.

Women's

Belgium
Czech Republic
Finland
Ireland
Lithuania
Netherlands
Portugal
Spain

Spain was relegated into League 1 from Superleague 2007 and Belgium & Lithuania are promoted into the 1st League from 2nd League 2007 for 2008 European Cup.

=== Day 1 ===
==== Events and winners ====
Men

Event	Winner	Country
Hammer throw	Aleksandr Vashchyla	Belarus
High jump	Tomáš Janku	Czech Republic
400m hurdles	Ondrej Danek	Czech Republic
100m	Francis Obikwelu	Portugal
1500m	Michal Šneberger	Czech Republic
Shot put	Rutger Smith	Netherlands
Long jump	Nelson Évora	Portugal
400m	Kevin Borlée	Belgium
5000m	Günther Weidlinger	Austria
4 × 100 m relay	Portugal	Portugal

Women

Event	Winner	Country
Pole vault	Naroa Agirre	Spain
Triple jump	Carlota Castrejana	Spain
400m hurdles	Zuzana Hejnová	Czech Republic
Discus throw	Vera Cechlová	Czech Republic
100m	Kim Gevaert	Belgium
800m	Yvonne Hak	Netherlands
3000m	Dolores Checa	Spain
400m	Annemarie Schulte	Netherlands
Javelin throw	Barbora Špotáková	Czech Republic
3000m Steeplechase	Rosa María Morató	Spain
4 × 100 m relay	Belgium	Belgium

==== Standings ====
Men

Pos	Country	Pts
1	Czech Republic	106
2	Netherlands	106
3	Portugal	105
4	Belgium	96
5	Finland	92
6	Belarus	82
7	Austria	67.5
8	Norway	63.5

Women

Pos	Country	Pts
1	Spain	125
2	Czech Republic	107
3	Belgium	91
4	Portugal	84
5	Lithuania	80
6	Ireland	79
7	Netherlands	77
8	Finland	76

=== Group B ===
At Enka Sadi Gülçelik Stadium, Istanbul, (Turkey), on 21 & 22 June 2008.

Men's

Croatia
Hungary
Romania
Slovenia
Switzerland
Sweden
Turkey
Ukraine

Ukraine was relegated into League 1 from Superleague 2007 and Turkey & Croatia are promoted into the 1st League from 2nd League 2007 for 2008 European Cup.

Women's

Bulgaria
Croatia
Greece
Hungary
Romania
Serbia
Sweden
Turkey

Greece was relegated into League 1 from Superleague 2007 and Turkey & Croatia are promoted into the 1st League from 2nd League 2007 for 2008 European Cup.

=== Day 1 ===
==== Events and winners ====
Men

Event	Winner	Country
Hammer throw	Krisztián Pars	Hungary
High jump	Stefan Holm	Sweden
400m hurdles	Stanislav Melnykov	Ukraine
100m	Matic Osovnikar	Slovenia
1500m	Peter Szemeti	Hungary
Shot put	Lajos Kürthy	Hungary
Long jump	Julien Fivaz	Switzerland
400m	Johan Wissman	Sweden
5000m	Selim Bayrak	Turkey
4 × 100 m relay	Ukraine	Ukraine

Women

Event	Winner	Country
Pole vault	Afrodíti Skafída	Greece
Triple jump	Hrisopiyí Devetzí	Greece
400m hurdles	Tsvetelina Kirilova	Bulgaria
Discus throw	Nicoleta Grasu	Romania
100m	Inna Eftimova	Bulgaria
800m	Liliana Popescu	Romania
3000m	Alemitu Bekele	Turkey
400m	Barbara Petráhn	Hungary
Javelin throw	Nikolett Szabó	Hungary
3000m Steeplechase	Iríni Kokkinaríou	Greece
4 × 100 m relay	Bulgaria	Bulgaria

==== Standings ====
Men

Pos	Country	Pts
1	Sweden	117
2	Ukraine	106,5
3	Slovenia	96
4	Hungary	93,5
5	Switzerland	86
6	Romania	81,5
7	Turkey	79
8	Croatia	58,5

Women

Pos	Country	Pts
1	Greece	122
2	Romania	117,5
3	Turkey	90,5
4	Bulgaria	85
5	Sweden	84
6	Hungary	77
7	Serbia	74
8	Croatia	70

== Second League ==
=== Group A ===
At Kadrioru Stadium, Tallinn (Estonia), on 21 & 22 June 2008.

Men's

Bulgaria
Denmark
Estonia
Ireland
Iceland
Latvia
Lithuania
Luxembourg

Bulgaria & Ireland are relegated into 2nd League from 1st League 2007 for 2008 European Cup.

Women's

Austria
Denmark
Estonia
Iceland
Latvia
Luxembourg
Norway
Switzerland

Serbia & Norway are relegated into 2nd League from 1st League 2007 for 2008 European Cup.

=== Day 1 ===
==== Events and winners ====
Men

Event	Winner	Country
Hammer throw	Bergur Ingi Petursson	Iceland
High jump	Angel Kararadev	Bulgaria
400m hurdles	Gatis Spunde	Latvia
100m	Paul Hession	Ireland
1500m	Girts Azis	Latvia
Shot put	Taavi Peetre	Estonia
Long jump	Morten Jensen	Denmark
400m	Paul McKee	Ireland
5000m	Tiidrek Nurme	Estonia
4 × 100 m relay	Latvia	Latvia

Women

Event	Winner	Country
Pole vault	Thorey Edda Elisdottir	Iceland
Triple jump	Veera Baranova	Estonia
400m hurdles	Martina Näf	Switzerland
Discus throw	Eha Rünne	Estonia
100m	Ezinne Okparaebo	Norway
800m	Egle Uljas	Estonia
3000m	Sabine Fischer	Switzerland
400m	Ieva Zunda	Latvia
Javelin throw	Ásdís Hjálmsdóttir	Iceland
3000m Steeplechase	Andrea Mayr	Austria
4 × 100 m relay	Norway	Norway

==== Standings ====
Men

Pos	Country	Pts
1	Estonia	126
2	Latvia	122
3	Ireland	100
4	Denmark	99
5	Bulgaria	91
6	Lithuania	79
7	Iceland	55
8	Luxembourg	45

Women

Pos	Country	Pts
1	Norway	124
2	Estonia	119
3	Switzerland	116
4	Latvia	98
5	Austria	89
6	Iceland	70
7	Denmark	66
8	Luxembourg	37

=== Group B ===
At SNP Stadium, Banská Bystrica (Slovakia), on 21 & 22 June 2008.

Men's

AASSE
Albania
Andorra
Armenia
Azerbaijan
Bosnia and Herzegovina
Cyprus
Georgia
Israel
Macedonia
Moldova
Montenegro
Serbia
Slovakia

Serbia & Slovakia are relegated into 2nd League from 1st League 2007 for 2008 European Cup.

Women's

AASSE
Albania
Andorra
Armenia
Azerbaijan
Bosnia and Herzegovina
Cyprus
Georgia
Israel
Macedonia
Moldova
Montenegro
Slovakia
Slovenia

Cyprus & Slovakia are relegated into 2nd League from 1st League 2007 for 2008 European Cup.

=== Day 1 ===
==== Events and winners ====
Men

Event	Winner	Country
Hammer throw	Libor Charfreitag	Slovakia
High jump	Dragutin Topić	Serbia
400m hurdles	Minas Alozides	Cyprus
100m	Ruslan Abbasov	Azerbaijan
1500m	Mirko Petrović	Serbia
Shot put	Milan Haborák	Slovakia
Long jump	Admir Bregu	Albania
400m	Peter Žňava	Slovakia
5000m	Gezachw Yossef	Israel
4 × 100 m relay	Azerbaijan	Azerbaijan

Women

Event	Winner	Country
Pole vault	Tina Sutej	Slovenia
Triple jump	Dana Veldáková	Slovakia
400m hurdles	Sara Orešnik	Slovenia
Discus throw	Sivan Jean	Israel
100m	Alenka Bikar	Slovenia
800m	Lucia Klocová	Slovakia
3000m	Sonja Roman	Slovenia
400m	Sabina Veit	Slovenia
Javelin throw	Martina Ratej	Slovenia
3000m Steeplechase	Oxana Juravel	Moldova
4 × 100 m relay	Slovenia	Slovenia

==== Standings ====
Men

Pos	Country	Pts
1	Serbia	232
2	Slovakia	230
3	Cyprus	208,5
4	Israel	206,5
5	Moldova	185
6	Bosnia	167
7	Georgia	163,5
8	Azerbaijan	150
9	Montenegro	127,5
10	Armenia	119
11	AASSE	79
12	Andorra	68
13	Macedonia	65
14	Albania	55

Women

Pos	Country	Pts
1	Slovenia	261
2	Slovakia	222,5
3	Israel	216
4	Cyprus	216
5	Moldova	210
6	Bosnia	177
7	AASSE	133,5
8	Montenegro	108
9	Armenia	106
10	Georgia	90
11	Andorra	88,5
12	Albania	67,5
13	Azerbaijan	62
14	Macedonia	59

== See also ==
- European Cup in Athletics 2007
