= 2006 European Athletics Championships – Men's 4 × 400 metres relay =

Men's 4 × 400 metres relay at the European Athletics Championships

The men's 4 × 400 metres relay at the 2006 European Athletics Championships were held at the Ullevi on August 12 and August 13.

France and Great Britain both overtook the Polish team in the home straight to finish 1st and 2nd respectively.

== Medalists ==
Gold	Silver	Bronze
France; Leslie Djhone; Idrissa M'barke; Naman Keïta; Marc Raquil; Brice Panel*; Abderrahim El Haouzy*	United Kingdom; Robert Tobin; Rhys Williams; Graham Hedman; Timothy Benjamin	Poland; Daniel Dąbrowski; Piotr Kędzia; Piotr Rysiukiewicz; Rafał Wieruszewski; Marcin Marciniszyn*

*Athletes who competed in heats only

== Schedule ==
Date	Time	Round
August 12, 2006	15:30	Heats
August 13, 2006	17:10	Final

== Results ==
KEY:	q	Fastest non-qualifiers	Q	Qualified	NR	National record	PB	Personal best	SB	Seasonal best

=== Heats ===
First 3 in each heat (Q) and the next 2 fastest (q) advance to the Final.

Rank	Heat	Nation	Athlete	Time	Notes
1	2	United Kingdom	Robert Tobin, Rhys Williams, Graham Hedman, Timothy Benjamin	3:02.51	Q
2	1	Germany	Kamghe Gaba, Florian Seitz, Ruwen Faller, Bastian Swillims	3:03.25	Q
3	1	Poland	Piotr Kędzia, Piotr Rysiukiewicz, Marcin Marciniszyn, Daniel Dąbrowski	3:03.49	Q
4	2	Russia	Konstantin Svechkar, Ivan Buzolin, Aleksandr Larin, Yevgeniy Lebedev	3:03.73	Q
5	2	France	Brice Panel, Idrissa M'Barke, Abderrahim El Haouzy, Naman Keïta	3:03.87	Q
6	1	Romania	Vasile Bobos, Florin Suciu, Catalin Cîmpeanu, Ioan Vieru	3:04.23	Q, NR
7	2	Ireland	Paul McKee, Brian Doyle, David Gillick, David McCarthy	3:04.59	q
8	1	Spain	David Melo, David Testa, Salvador Rodríguez, Santiago Ezquerro	3:04.71	q
8	2	Ukraine	Oleksiy Rachkovsky, Andriy Tverdostup, Vitaliy Dubonosov, Yevheniy Zyukov	3:04.71	q
10	1	Italy	Claudio Licciardello, Edoardo Vallet, Luca Galletti, Gianni Carabelli	3:05.53	
11	1	Greece	Dimitrios Gravalos, Dimitrios Regas, Padeleimon Melahrinoudis, Periklis Iakovakis	3:05.59	
12	1	Czech Republic	Filip Klvana, Jiří Vojtík, Vojtech Šulc, Michal Uhlík	3:06.14	
13	2	Norway	Morten Sand, Lars Eric Sæther, Quincy Douglas, Steffen Kjønnås	3:07.65	
14	2	Sweden	Joni Jaako, Andreas Mokdasi, Thomas Nikitin, Fredrik Johansson	3:07.73	

=== Final ===
Rank	Nation	Athletes	Time	Notes
1st place, gold medalist(s)	France	Leslie Djhone, Idrissa M'Barke, Naman Keïta, Marc Raquil	3:01.10	
2nd place, silver medalist(s)	United Kingdom	Robert Tobin, Rhys Williams, Graham Hedman, Timothy Benjamin	3:01.63	
3rd place, bronze medalist(s)	Poland	Daniel Dąbrowski, Piotr Kędzia, Piotr Rysiukiewicz, Rafał Wieruszewski	3:01.73	
4	Germany	Kamghe Gaba, Florian Seitz, Ruwen Faller, Bastian Swillims	3:02.83	
5	Ukraine	Oleksiy Rachkovsky, Andriy Tverdostup, Vitaliy Dubonosov, Yevheniy Zyukov	3:04.33	
6	Romania	Vasile Bobos, Florin Suciu, Catalin Cîmpeanu, Ioan Vieru	3:04.53	
7	Russia	Konstantin Svechkar, Yevgeniy Lebedev, Aleksandr Larin, Vladislav Frolov	3:04.73	
8	Spain	David Melo, David Testa, Salvador Rodríguez, Santiago Ezquerro	3:04.98	
9	Ireland	Paul McKee, Brian Doyle, David Gillick, David McCarthy	3:05.57	
