= 2006 European Athletics Championships – Men's 400 metres hurdles =

Men's 400 metres hurdles at the European Athletics Championships

The men's 400 metres hurdles at the 2006 European Athletics Championships were held at the Ullevi on August 9 and August 10.

Iakovákis and Plawgo were well ahead of the field, while Williams surged towards the finish line and pipped Frenchman Naman Keïta by a hundredth.

== Medalists ==
Gold	Silver	Bronze
Periklis Iakovakis; Greece	Marek Plawgo; Poland	Rhys Williams; United Kingdom

== Schedule ==
Date	Time	Round
August 9, 2006	17:40	Semifinals
August 10, 2006	19:40	Final

== Results ==
KEY:	q	Fastest non-qualifiers	Q	Qualified	NR	National record	PB	Personal best	SB	Seasonal best

=== Semifinals ===
First 2 in each heat (Q) and the next 2 fastest (q) advance to the Final.

Rank	Heat	Name	Nationality	Time	Notes
1	1	Marek Plawgo	Poland	49.13	Q, SB
2	1	Minas Alozidis	Greece	49.31	Q, PB
3	1	Naman Keïta	France	49.34	q
4	2	Periklis Iakovakis	Greece	49.43	Q
5	3	Rhys Williams	United Kingdom	49.58	Q
6	1	Aleksandr Derevyagin	Russia	49.72	q
7	3	Gianni Carabelli	Italy	49.97	Q
8	2	Sébastien Maillard	France	50.22	Q
9	3	Jiří Mužík	Czech Republic	50.29	
10	3	Vladimir Antmanis	Russia	50.57	
11	2	Dai Greene	United Kingdom	50.66	
12	1	Milan Kotur	Croatia	50.69	SB
12	2	Michal Uhlík	Czech Republic	50.69	
14	3	Platon Gavelas	Greece	50.77	
15	3	Héni Kechi	France	50.78	
16	2	Christian Grossenbacher	Switzerland	50.93	
17	3	Tuncay Örs	Turkey	51.14	SB
18	2	Laurent Ottoz	Italy	51.22	
19	2	Eduardo Iván Rodríguez	Spain	51.24	
20	3	José María Romera	Spain	51.73	
	1	Ryan Dinham	United Kingdom		DSQ
	1	Ondrej Danek	Czech Republic		DNS

=== Final ===
Rank	Lane	Name	Nationality	Time	Notes
1st place, gold medalist(s)	4	Periklis Iakovakis	Greece	48.46	
2nd place, silver medalist(s)	6	Marek Plawgo	Poland	48.71	SB
3rd place, bronze medalist(s)	3	Rhys Williams	United Kingdom	49.12	
4	8	Naman Keïta	France	49.13	
5	1	Sébastien Maillard	France	49.54	
6	2	Gianni Carabelli	Italy	49.60	
7	5	Minas Alozidis	Greece	49.61	
8	7	Aleksandr Derevyagin	Russia	50.31	
