= 2001 European Athletics U23 Championships – Men's 4 × 400 metres relay =

The men's 4 x 400 metres relay event at the 2001 European Athletics U23 Championships was held in Amsterdam, Netherlands, at Olympisch Stadion on 14 and 15 July.

== Medalists ==
Gold	David Naismith; Adam Potter; Richard McDonald; Matthew Elias; United Kingdom
Silver	Simon Kirch; Stefan Holz; Ruwen Faller; Marc Alexander Scheer; Germany
Bronze	Oleg Mishukov; Maksim Babarykin; Dmitriy Bogdanov; Yevgeniy Lebedev; Russia

== Results ==
=== Final ===
15 July

Rank	Nation	Competitors	Time	Notes
1st place, gold medalist(s)	United Kingdom	David Naismith; Adam Potter; Richard McDonald; Matthew Elias	3:05.24	
2nd place, silver medalist(s)	Germany	Simon Kirch; Stefan Holz; Ruwen Faller; Marc Alexander Scheer	3:05.39	
3rd place, bronze medalist(s)	Russia	Oleg Mishukov; Maksim Babarykin; Dmitriy Bogdanov; Yevgeniy Lebedev	3:06.41	
4	Spain	Salvador Rodríguez; Artzai Morante; José María Romera; Antonio Manuel Reina	3:06.96	
5	Italy	Luca Galletti; Pierpaolo Sanna; Gianni Carabelli; Andrea Barberi	3:08.01	
6	Greece	Stilianos Kopanou; Georgios Doupis; Platon Gavelas; Periklis Iakovakis	3:08.30	
7	Czech Republic	Pavel Jelínek; Michal Uhlík; Martin Košťál; Jiří Vojtík	3:08.39	
8	France	Fabrice Zircon; Stéphane Pitard; Loïc Clément; Salah-Eddine Ghaidi	3:14.24	

=== Heats ===
14 July
Qualified: first 3 in each heat and 2 best to the Final

==== Heat 1 ====
Rank	Nation	Competitors	Time	Notes
1	United Kingdom	David Naismith; Adam Potter; Richard McDonald; Matthew Elias	3:07.33	Q
2	Russia	Oleg Mishukov; Maksim Babarykin; Dmitriy Bogdanov; Yevgeniy Lebedev	3:07.39	Q
3	Germany	Simon Kirch; Stefan Holz; Ruwen Faller; Marc Alexander Scheer	3:07.72	Q
4	Spain	Salvador Rodríguez; Artzai Morante; José María Romera; Antonio Manuel Reina	3:08.98	q
5	Greece	Platon Gavelas; Georgios Doupis; Stilianos Kopanou; Periklis Iakovakis	3:09.15	q

==== Heat 2 ====
Rank	Nation	Competitors	Time	Notes
1	Czech Republic	Pavel Jelínek; Michal Uhlík; Martin Košťál; Jiří Vojtík	3:09.40	Q
2	Italy	Luca Galletti; Pierpaolo Sanna; Gianni Carabelli; Andrea Barberi	3:10.16	Q
3	France	Fabrice Zircon; Stéphane Pitard; Loïc Clément; Salah-Eddine Ghaidi	3:10.74	Q
4	Poland	Michał Węglarski; Zenon Miśtak; Maciej Ryszkowski; Tomasz Rudnik	3:10.77	
5	Netherlands	Martin de Groot; Arnold Liefers; Thomas Kortbeek; Peter Wolters	3:11.10	

== Participation ==
According to an unofficial count, 40 athletes from 10 countries participated in the event.

- Czech Republic (4)
- France (4)
- Germany (4)
- Greece (4)
- Italy (4)
- Netherlands (4)
- Poland (4)
- Russia (4)
- Spain (4)
- United Kingdom (4)
