= Athletics at the 2007 Summer Universiade – Men's 400 metres hurdles =

International sporting competition

The men's 400 metres hurdles event at the 2007 Summer Universiade was held on 11–13 August.

== Medalists ==
Gold	Silver	Bronze
Petrus Koekemoer; South Africa	Kurt Couto; Mozambique	Javier Culson; Puerto Rico

== Results ==
=== Heats ===
Qualification: First 3 of each heat (Q) and the next 4 fastest (q) qualified for the semifinals.

Rank	Heat	Name	Nationality	Time	Notes
1	2	Vladimir Antmanis	Russia	50.36	Q
2	3	El Hadji Sethe Mbow	Senegal	50.42	Q
3	2	Ockert Cilliers	South Africa	50.44	Q
4	4	Kurt Couto	Mozambique	50.48	Q
5	3	Raphael Fernandes	Brazil	50.52	Q
6	1	Javier Culson	Puerto Rico	50.58	Q
7	2	Yasuhiro Fueki	Japan	50.69	Q
8	3	Michal Uhlík	Czech Republic	50.73	Q
9	4	Ben Carne	Great Britain	50.76	Q
10	4	Yevgeniy Meleshenko	Kazakhstan	50.91	Q
11	2	Abderahmane Hamadi	Algeria	51.23	q, SB
12	3	Ou Yongjian	China	51.36	q
13	2	Jussi Heikkilä	Finland	51.37	q
14	1	Steven Green	Great Britain	51.44	Q
15	4	Markus Crepaz	Italy	51.47	q
16	1	Petrus Koekemoer	South Africa	52.03	Q
17	3	Tuncay Örs	Turkey	52.36	
18	3	Camilo Quevedo	Guatemala	52.43	
19	1	Bojan Maljković	Serbia	52.56	
20	1	Denis Byvakin	Russia	52.65	
21	2	Teeraporn Parkum	Thailand	53.17	
22	1	Nicola Cascella	Italy	53.27	
23	4	Jon Bentsen	Denmark	54.06	
24	2	Mart Kroodo	Estonia	54.51	
25	4	Horatius Abrahams	Namibia	55.51	
26	3	Heditiana Rampy Andrianjaka	Malaysia	56.98	
	1	Apisit Kuttiyawan	Thailand	DNS	
	4	Jermiah Shule	Kenya	DNS	

=== Semifinals ===
Qualification: First 4 of each semifinal qualified directly (Q) for the final.

Rank	Heat	Name	Nationality	Time	Notes
1	2	Javier Culson	Puerto Rico	49.68	Q
2	1	Yevgeniy Meleshenko	Kazakhstan	49.71	Q, SB
3	1	Kurt Couto	Mozambique	50.04	Q, SB
4	1	Petrus Koekemoer	South Africa	50.09	Q
5	2	Ockert Cilliers	South Africa	50.23	Q
6	1	Michal Uhlík	Czech Republic	50.26	Q
7	2	Vladimir Antmanis	Russia	50.32	Q
8	1	El Hadji Sethe Mbow	Senegal	50.58	
9	2	Steven Green	Great Britain	50.59	Q
10	1	Ben Carne	Great Britain	50.61	
11	2	Yasuhiro Fueki	Japan	51.02	
12	2	Jussi Heikkilä	Finland	51.04	
13	1	Raphael Fernandes	Brazil	51.06	FS1
14	1	Ou Yongjian	China	51.23	
15	2	Markus Crepaz	Italy	51.30	
16	2	Abderahmane Hamadi	Algeria	56.78	

=== Final ===
Rank	Lane	Name	Nationality	Time	Notes
1st place, gold medalist(s)	7	Petrus Koekemoer	South Africa	49.06	
2nd place, silver medalist(s)	4	Kurt Couto	Mozambique	49.12	SB
3rd place, bronze medalist(s)	6	Javier Culson	Puerto Rico	49.35	
4	5	Ockert Cilliers	South Africa	49.36	
5	3	Yevgeniy Meleshenko	Kazakhstan	49.86	
6	1	Vladimir Antmanis	Russia	50.48	
7	2	Michal Uhlík	Czech Republic	50.54	
	8	Steven Green	Great Britain	DNF	
