= 1998 World Junior Championships in Athletics – Men's 400 metres hurdles =

The men's 400 metres hurdles event at the 1998 World Junior Championships in Athletics was held in Annecy, France, at Parc des Sports on 28, 29 and 31 July.

== Medalists ==
Gold	Periklís Iakovákis; Greece
Silver	Osiris Martínez; Cuba
Bronze	Peter Bate; Australia

== Results ==
=== Final ===
31 July

Rank	Name	Nationality	Time	Notes
1st place, gold medalist(s)	Periklís Iakovákis	Greece	49.82	
2nd place, silver medalist(s)	Osiris Martínez	Cuba	50.17	
3rd place, bronze medalist(s)	Peter Bate	Australia	50.83	
4	Tomasz Rudnik	Poland	50.98	
5	Terrance Wilson	United States	50.99	
6	François Coetzee	South Africa	51.20	
7	Chabib El-Azouizi	Morocco	51.41	
8	Lin Chin-Fu	Chinese Taipei	52.04	

=== Semifinals ===
29 July

==== Semifinal 1 ====
Rank	Name	Nationality	Time	Notes
1	Osiris Martínez	Cuba	50.45	Q
2	Lin Chin-Fu	Chinese Taipei	50.47	Q
3	Terrance Wilson	United States	51.10	Q
4	François Coetzee	South Africa	51.35	q
5	Tomasz Rudnik	Poland	51.47	q
6	Tahar Ghozali	Algeria	52.12	
7	Richard McDonald	United Kingdom	52.13	
8	David Lloyd	Jamaica	52.15	

==== Semifinal 2 ====
Rank	Name	Nationality	Time	Notes
1	Peter Bate	Australia	50.50	Q
2	Periklís Iakovákis	Greece	50.73	Q
3	Chabib El-Azouizi	Morocco	51.11	Q
4	Satoshi Oshikawa	Japan	51.55	
5	Reginald Depass	United States	51.89	
6	Carlos García	Spain	52.03	
7	Nicholas O'Brien	New Zealand	52.04	
8	Stefano Cuzzi	Italy	52.71	

=== Heats ===
28 July

==== Heat 1 ====
Rank	Name	Nationality	Time	Notes
1	Chabib El-Azouizi	Morocco	52.03	Q
2	Reginald Depass	United States	52.20	Q
3	Salah Ghaidi	France	52.66	
4	Dmitriy Zhukov	Russia	52.68	
5	Robson dos Santos	Brazil	53.42	
6	José Moncada	Venezuela	53.60	
7	Andreas Wickert	Germany	54.42	
8	Salem Al-Ameeri	Bahrain	58.19	

==== Heat 2 ====
Rank	Name	Nationality	Time	Notes
1	Periklís Iakovákis	Greece	51.99	Q
2	Tomasz Rudnik	Poland	52.31	Q
3	Adrian Medhurst	Australia	52.80	
4	Mohamed Mouhlal	Morocco	53.02	
5	Sveinn Þórarinsson	Iceland	53.46	
6	Aissa Hassan Saadoun	Qatar	54.38	

==== Heat 3 ====
Rank	Name	Nationality	Time	Notes
1	Peter Bate	Australia	50.93	Q
2	Osiris Martínez	Cuba	52.00	Q
3	David Lloyd	Jamaica	52.06	q
4	Jon Torben Flöttmann	Germany	52.88	
5	Saso Božic	Slovenia	53.04	
6	Carlo Dambruoso	Italy	53.67	
7	Roberto Carbajal	Mexico	53.79	
8	Moncef Kessab	Algeria	54.93	

==== Heat 4 ====
Rank	Name	Nationality	Time	Notes
1	Lin Chin-Fu	Chinese Taipei	51.43	Q
2	Satoshi Oshikawa	Japan	52.22	Q
3	Tahar Ghozali	Algeria	52.25	q
4	Carlos García	Spain	52.46	q
5	Jakub Havlín	Czech Republic	52.72	
6	Dirk Le Roux	South Africa	52.78	
7	Kirill Sedykh	Russia	53.00	
8	Essel Mensah	Ghana	58.12	

==== Heat 5 ====
Rank	Name	Nationality	Time	Notes
1	Terrance Wilson	United States	51.61	Q
2	François Coetzee	South Africa	51.64	Q
3	Stefano Cuzzi	Italy	52.10	q
4	Nicholas O'Brien	New Zealand	52.11	q
5	Richard McDonald	United Kingdom	52.33	q
6	Hani Al-Mourhej	Syria	52.61	
7	Wendell Colares	Brazil	54.98	
8	Ryan Clarke	Jamaica	60.62	

== Participation ==
According to an unofficial count, 38 athletes from 28 countries participated in the event.

- Algeria (2)
- Australia (2)
- Bahrain (1)
- Brazil (2)
- Chinese Taipei (1)
- Cuba (1)
- Czech Republic (1)
- France (1)
- Germany (2)
- Ghana (1)
- Greece (1)
- Iceland (1)
- Italy (2)
- Jamaica (2)
- Japan (1)
- Mexico (1)
- Morocco (2)
- New Zealand (1)
- Poland (1)
- Qatar (1)
- Russia (2)
- Slovenia (1)
- South Africa (2)
- Spain (1)
- Syria (1)
- United Kingdom (1)
- United States (2)
- Venezuela (1)
