= Gianni Carabelli =

Italian hurdler (born 1979)

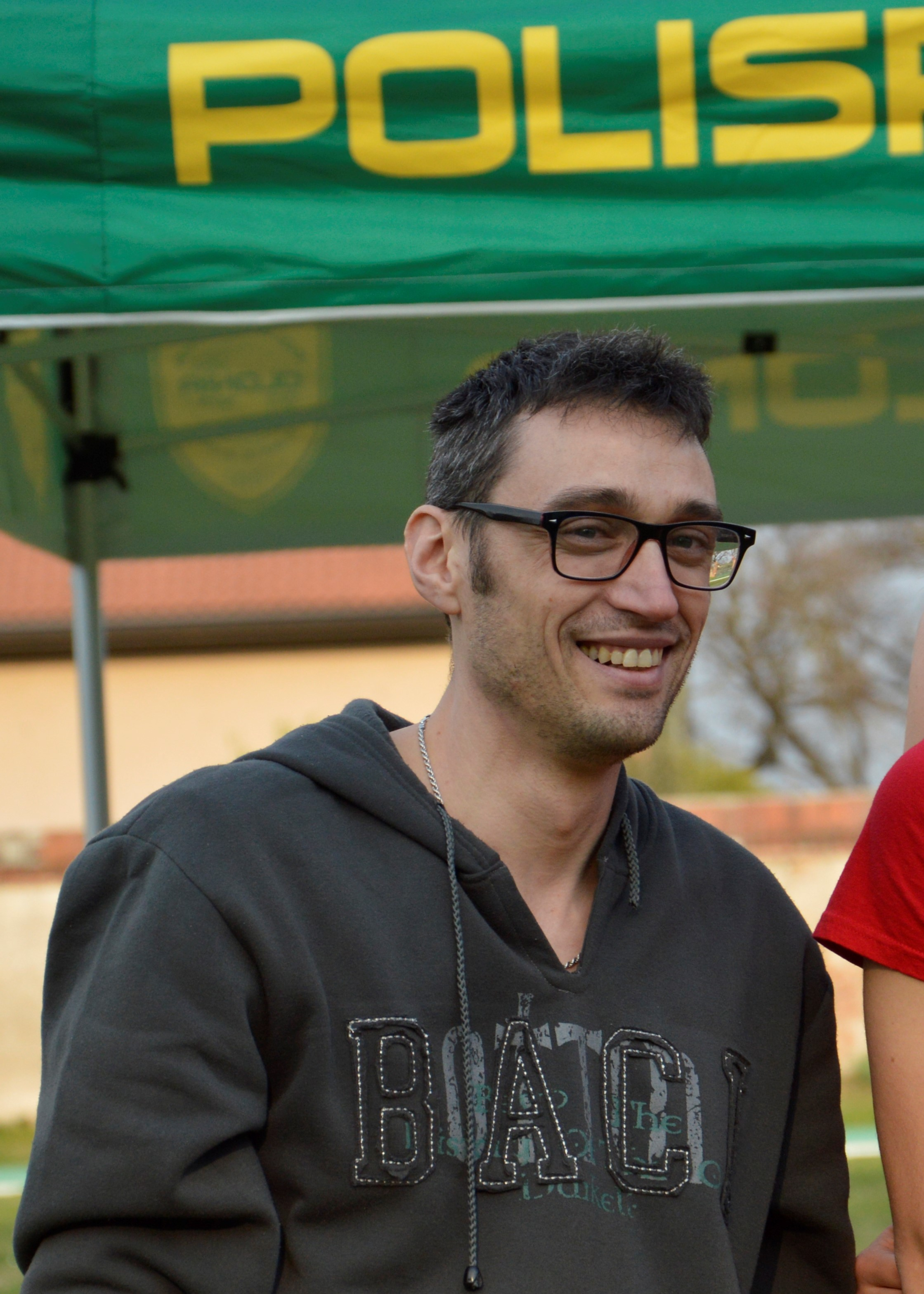

Personal information
- Nationality: Italian
- Born: 30 May 1979 (age 47) Busto Arsizio, Italy
- Height: 1.87 m (6 ft 1 1/2 in)
- Weight: 69 kg (152 lb)

Sport
- Sport: Track and field
- Event: 400 metres hurdles
- Club: Centro Sportivo Carabinieri
- Retired: 2011

Achievements and titles
- Personal bests: 400 m: 46.89; 400 m hurdles: 48.84
Medal record
Mediterranean Games
Gold medal – first place	2005 Almería	400 m hurdles

Gianni Carabelli (born 30 May 1979) is an Italian former athlete who specialized in the 400 metres hurdles.

== Biography ==
He was a semi-finalist at the 2005 World Championships and finished 6th in the 400 m hurdles final at the 2006 European Athletics Championships in Gothenburg.

He graduated from high school in 1998 while he has a degree in computer science.

== Achievements ==
Representing Italy
Year	Competition	Venue	Position	Event	Notes
2001	European U23 Championships	Amsterdam, Netherlands	6th	400 m hurdles	51.38
2001	European U23 Championships	Amsterdam, Netherlands	5th	4 × 400 m relay	3:08.01
2001	Universiade	Beijing, China	5th (h)	400 m hurdles	50.95
2002	European Championships	Munich, Germany	19th (h)	400 m hurdles	50.30
2003	Universiade	Daegu, South Korea	14th (h)	400 m hurdles	51.06
2005	Mediterranean Games	Almería, Spain	1st	400 m hurdles	49.32
2005	World Championships	Helsinki, Finland	18th (sf)	400 m hurdles	49.77
2006	European Championships	Gothenburg, Sweden	6th	400 m hurdles	49.60
2006	European Championships	Gothenburg, Sweden	10th (h)	4 × 400 m relay	3:05.53
2007	World Championships	Osaka, Japan	22nd (sf)	400 m hurdles	50.35

== See also ==
- Italian all-time top lists – 400 metres hurdles
