= Michal Uhlík =

Czech hurdler

Personal information
- Born: 9 March 1980 (age 45)

Michal Uhlík (born 9 March 1980) is a retired Czech athlete who specialized in the 400 metres hurdles.

He finished fifth at the 2005 Summer Universiade and seventh at the 2007 Summer Universiade. He also competed at the 2001 European U23 Championships, the 2006 European Championships and the 2010 European Championships (semi-final) without reaching the final.

In the 4 × 400 metres relay he finished seventh at the 2001 European U23 Championships and competed at the 2006 European Championships without reaching the final.

His personal best time was 49.43 seconds, achieved in July 2005 in Kladno.
