= Periklis Iakovakis =

Greek hurdler (born 1979)

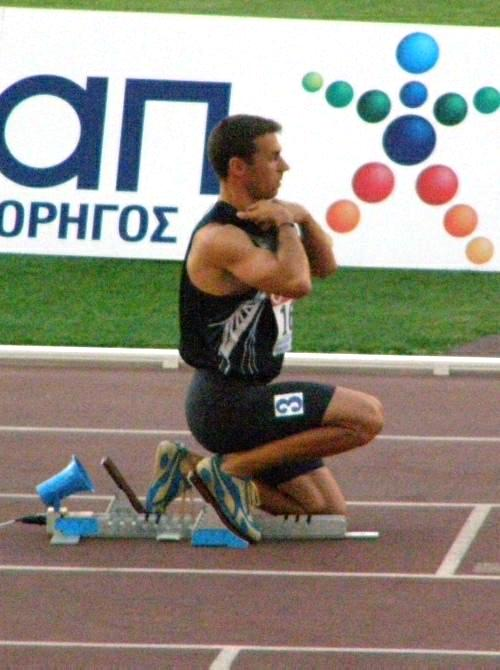

Personal information
- Born: March 24, 1979 (age 47) Patras, Greece
- Height: 1.83 m (6 ft 0 in)
- Weight: 77 kg (170 lb)

Sport
- Country: Greece
- Sport: Athletics
- Event: 400 m Hurdles
Medal record
World Championships
Bronze medal – third place	2003 Paris	400 m hurdles
European Championships
Gold medal – first place	2006 Göteborg	400 m hurdles
Mediterranean Games
Gold medal – first place	2001 Tunis	400 m hurdles
Bronze medal – third place	2013 Mersin	4 × 400 m relay

Periklís Iakovákis (Greek: Περικλής Ιακωβάκης, [periˈklis iakoˈvacis], born 24 March 1979) is a retired Greek athlete mainly competing in 400 metres hurdles. He is the Greek record holder with a time of 47.82 seconds and fifteen times national champion in the event.

He has competed at four Summer Olympics (2000, 2004, 2008 and 2012) and is a six-time participant at the World Championships in Athletics. He was the world bronze medalist in 2003 and the European champion in 2006. His first major win came at the 1998 World Junior Championships and he won the gold medal at the 2001 Mediterranean Games. He was named the 2003 and 2006 Greek Male Athlete of the Year.

== Career ==
In 1998 Iakovakis won the gold medal at the World Junior Championships in Annecy, France with 49.82 seconds, and five years later he won the bronze medal at the 2003 World Championships in Athletics in Paris-Saint-Denis, France. In the final at the Stade de France, he finished in 48.24 seconds after Félix Sánchez and Joey Woody.

Iakovakis achieved his personal best of 47.82 seconds on 6 May 2006 in Osaka during the IAAF World Athletics Tour and won his first major competition 3 months later. He became European Champion in Gothenborg, Sweden finishing at 48.46 seconds in the final.

After his win at the European Championships, Iakovakis won the full-lap hurdles event in 47.92 seconds at the Zurich Weltklasse Golden League meet at the last evening that this top meeting would be held at the Letzigrund. The reigning European Champion was then first at the Herculis IAAF World Athletics Tour meeting in Monaco.

He won the bronze medal at the 2009 IAAF World Athletics Final, which was the last edition of the competition and was held in Thessaloniki.

In 2010 he set a season target of defending his European title. He suffered a minor injury to his soleus muscle in March, but recovered and began his preparation in South Africa and Cyprus. He identified Dai Greene (the eventual winner) as his main European rival in the event. Finally he did not succeed in his goal, as he finished in the fifth place in the 2010 European final, having run in the tight first lane. He was slower in the 2011 season and, for the first time since 1998, his fastest run that year was over 50 seconds. He missed a seventh consecutive appearance at the World Championships, but did compete for Greece in the First League of the 2011 European Team Championships, where he won the 400 m hurdles race. He marked a resurgence in form at the 2012 Greek Championships by winning his 15th straight national title, including a run of 49.04 seconds in the heats.

Maria Sotirakopoulou has been his coach for many years.

== Honours ==
Year	Competition	Venue	Position	Event	Notes
Representing Greece
1996	World Junior Championships	Sydney, Australia	34th (h)	400 m	47.98
1996	World Junior Championships	Sydney, Australia	—	4 × 400 m relay	DNF
1997	European Junior Championships	Ljubljana, Slovenia	2nd	400 m	46.68
1997	European Junior Championships	Ljubljana, Slovenia	2nd	4 × 400 relay	3:08.29
1998	World Junior Championships	Annecy, France	1st	400 m hurdles	49.82
1998	World Junior Championships	Annecy, France	7th	4 × 400 m relay	3:09.70
1998	European Championships	Budapest, Hungary	9th (sf)	4 × 400 metres relay	3:06.48 SB
1999	World Indoor Championships	Maebashi, Japan	15th (sf)	400 m	47.23
1999	European U23 Championships	Gothenburg, Sweden	3rd	400 m hurdles	49.97
1999	European U23 Championships	Gothenburg, Sweden	6th	4 × 400 m relay	3:06.81
1999	World Championships	Seville, Spain	17th (h)	400 m hurdles	49.53
1999	World Championships	Seville, Spain	15th (h)	4 × 400 metres relay	3:04.07 NR
2000	Olympic Games	Sydney, Australia	25th (h)	400 m hurdles	50.20
2000	Olympic Games	Sydney, Australia	18th (h)	4 × 400 metres relay	3:06.50
2001	European U23 Championships	Amsterdam, Netherlands	2nd	400 m hurdles	49.63
2001	European U23 Championships	Amsterdam, Netherlands	6th	4 × 400 m relay	3:08.30
2001	World Championships	Edmonton, Canada	14th (sf)	400 m hurdles	49.38
2001	Mediterranean Games	Tunis, Tunisia	1st	400 m hurdles	50.21
2002	European Championships	Munich, Germany	5th	400 m hurdles	49.07
2002	European Championships	Munich, Germany	6th	4 × 400 metres relay	3:04.26
2003	European Cup	Florence, Italy	2nd	400 m hurdles	49.23
2003	World Championships	Paris, France	3rd	400 m hurdles	48.24
2003	World Championships	Paris, France	6th	4 × 400 metres relay	3:02.56
2003	IAAF World Athletics Final	Monte Carlo, Monaco	6th	400 m hurdles	49.25
2004	Olympic Games	Athens, Greece	11th (sf)	400 m hurdles	48.47 SB
2004	Olympic Games	Athens, Greece	12th (sf)	4 × 400 metres relay	3:04.27
2005	World Championships	Helsinki, Finland	13th (sf)	400 m hurdles	49.28
2006	European Championships	Gothenburg, Sweden	1st	400 m hurdles	48.46
2006	World Athletics Final	Stuttgart, Germany	1st	400 m hurdles	47.92
2007	European Cup	Munich, Germany	1st	400 m hurdles	48.35
2007	World Championships	Osaka, Japan	6th	400 m hurdles	49.25
2008	European Cup	Annecy, France	1st	400 m hurdles	49.15
2008	Olympic Games	Beijing, China	8th	400 m hurdles	49.96
2009	European Team Championships	Leiria, Portugal	2nd	400 m hurdles	50.09
2009	World Championships	Berlin, Germany	5th	400 m hurdles	48.42 SB
2009	World Athletics Final	Thessaloniki, Greece	3rd	400 m hurdles	48.90
2010	European Championships	Barcelona, Spain	5th	400 m hurdles	49.38 SB
2012	European Championships	Helsinki, Finland	8th	400 m hurdles	50.57
2012	Olympic Games	London, United Kingdom	32nd (h)	400 m hurdles	50.27
2013	Mediterranean Games	Mersin, Turkey	3rd	4 × 400 metres relay	3:07.36
