= Tim Benjamin (sprinter) =

Athlete from Wales (born 1982)

Personal information
- Nationality: British (Welsh)
- Born: 2 May 1982 (age 44) South Glamorgan, Wales
- Height: 1.83 m (6 ft 0 in)
- Weight: 76 kg (12 st 0 lb; 168 lb)

Sport
- Club: Cardiff; Belgrave Harriers
- Turned pro: 1998

Achievements and titles
- Olympic finals: 2004; 4 × 400 m relay – 5th place
- World finals: 2005; 400 m – 5th place
- Highest world ranking: 3 (February 2006)
- Personal best(s): 60 m 6.75 (2000); 100 m 10.48 (2000); 200 m 20.67 (2001); 400 m 44.56 (2005)
Medal record
Men's athletics
Representing Great Britain
World Indoor Championships
Silver medal – second place	2003 Birmingham	4 × 400 m relay
European Championships
Silver medal – second place	2006 Gothenburg	4 × 400 m relay

Timothy David Benjamin (born 2 May 1982) is a former professional athlete from Wales. He specialised in the 400 metres who competed at the 2004 Summer Olympics.

== Biography ==
In his teens he was coached by Jock Anderson, in the same training group as Christian Malcolm. He then moved to live in Slough to be coached by Tony Lester; Marlon Devonish amongst others was one of his training partners. As a youngster, he ran over 200 metres, and won several junior titles, including the World Youth Championship in 1999. Soon after, he began to concentrate on the 400 m, and was selected for the relay squad at the World Championships in Athletics in Edmonton in 2001.

By 2002 he had established himself as one of Britain's best athletes, winning the British AAA Championships title, and running in the successful Team GB squad at the European Cup. In the Commonwealth Games that year, he helped guide Wales to a silver medal in the controversial 4 × 400 metres relay, which was won by England, and disputed by many, including the athletes themselves. It was during that year also that he earned a silver in the European Athletics U23 Championships in Poland.

He reached the semi-finals of the 2004 Olympics, and won the 400 m race at the 2004 European Cup. Further achievements in the 400 m came in 2005: he came fifth at the World Championships and took silver at the World Athletics Final.

At the 2006 European Athletics Championships in Gothenburg, he won the silver medal in the 4 × 400 m relay with the British team, as the finishing sprinter, along with Robert Tobin, Rhys Williams and Graham Hedman, in a time of 3:01.63. He finished sixth in the final of the individual event.

In late 2006, he announced that he was moving back to his hometown of Cardiff to be coached by former 100 metres hurdles world record holder Colin Jackson, whilst fellow Welsh relay member Rhys Williams would also be moving back from Loughborough. Benjamin competed at the 2007 World Championships in Osaka, but failed to make the final, recording 46.17 s in the semis.

Benjamin suffered a number of injuries and decided to bring an end to his athletics career in mid-2009. Citing his disappointment in missing the 2008 Beijing Olympics, he said that "taking an individual or relay spot in the Berlin World Championships from an aspiring 2012 Olympian would be disingenuous and unfair".

Benjamin won four British titles during his career, in addition to his 2002 success he was also AAA champion from 2004 to 2006. Following a number of injuries, he announced his retirement from athletics in 2009.

Benjamin is married to a sweetheart from his schooldays, Natalie Lewis, an accomplished Welsh middle distance specialist in her own right. They married in November 2007. His father is a highly regarded professor of Biosciences at Cardiff University.

== Personal bests ==
Last updated 6 April 2009

Event	Time (seconds)	Venue	Date
60 metres	6.75	Birmingham	2000
100 metres	10.48	Radyr Comprehensive School (Sports Day)	2000
200 metres	20.67	Cardiff, Wales	17 June 2001
400 metres	44.56	Monaco	9 September 2005

- All information taken from IAAF profile.
