= Richard Hill (runner) =

British former athlete (born 1986)

Personal information
- Nationality: British (English)
- Born: 12 February 1986 (age 40) East Midlands, England

Sport
- Sport: Athletics
- Event: middle-distance
- Club: Notts AC; UWIC

Richard Hill (born 12 February 1986) is an English former middle-distance runner who competed in the 800 metres. He ran for Great Britain, Notts AC and UWIC and specialised in the 800 metres.

== Biography ==
On 10 June 2006, Hill won the A-race of the BMC Grand Prix event at Watford in a time of 1:45.10. This time made Hill British No 1 for 2006. The race itself was notable too, because due to second placed Michael Rimmer and third placed Sam Ellis also running good times, British athletes held the top 3 places in the European 800m rankings (for a short while). This was the first time this had occurred in over 20 years.

Hill competed for Great Britain at the European Championships in Gothenburg in 2006 and the following year won the U23 national title and finished second behind Michael Rimmer at the 2007 British Athletics Championships.

In 2008 he won the national indoor title.

He has an elder brother, Craig, who competed at county level in cross country helping pave a successful path for Richard in athletics. Craig also has won the national BCC titles in volleyball and football showing sporting genes run in the family.

Richard, who also had trial spells with Leeds United FC, attributes his success to his PE teacher, parents and older brother.
