= Tatyana Veshkurova =

Russian sprint athlete (born 1981)

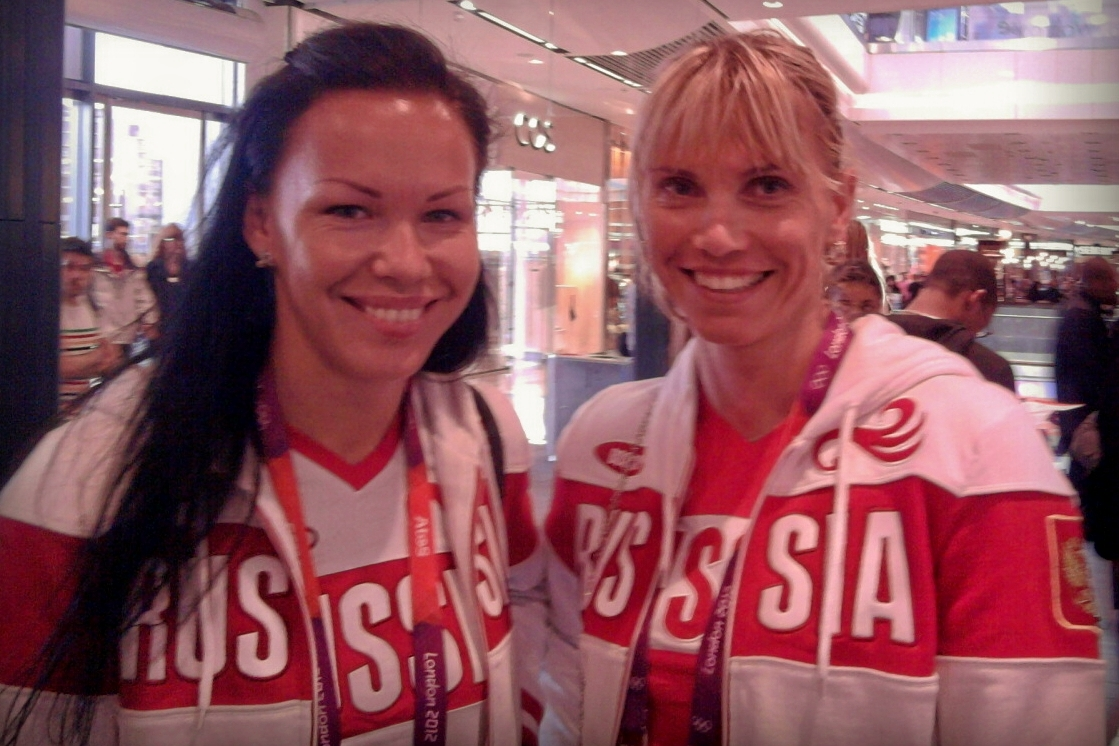
- Tatyana Veshkurova (right), at the 2012 London Summer Olympics

Personal information
- Nationality: Russia
- Born: 23 August 1981 (age 44)

Sport
- Country: Russia
- Sport: Women's athletics
- Event: 800 metres
Medal record
Summer Olympics
Disqualified	2008 Beijing	4 × 400 relay
European Indoors Championships
Silver medal – second place	2013 Gothenburg	4 × 400 m relay

Tatyana Leonidovna Veshkurova (Russian: Татьяна Леонидовна Вешкурова; born 23 September 1981) is a Russian sprint athlete.

She won the silver medal in the 400 m at the 2006 European Athletics Championships in Gothenburg, as well as a gold medal in the 4 × 400 m relay.
