= Rhys Williams (hurdler) =

British hurdling athlete

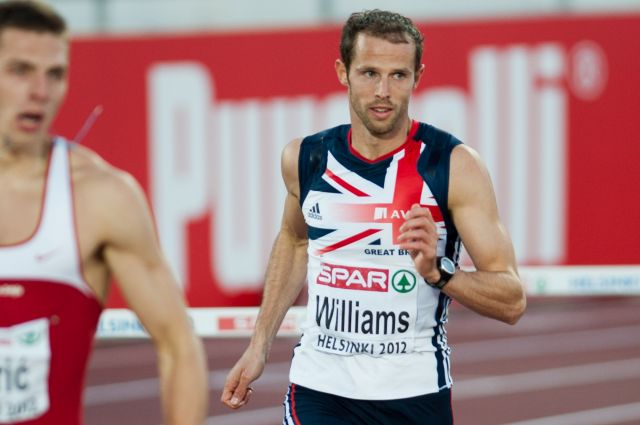
- Williams at the 2012 European Championships

Personal information
- Nationality: British (Welsh)
- Born: 27 February 1984 (age 42) Bridgend, Wales
- Height: 1.85 m (6 ft 1 in)
- Weight: 73 kg (161 lb; 11 st 7 lb)
- Parent: John Williams (father)

Sport
- Sport: Athletics
- Event: 400 m Hurdles
- Club: Cardiff AAC; Bridgend AC.
Medal record
Representing Great Britain
European Championships
Gold medal – first place	2012 Helsinki	400 m hurdles
Silver medal – second place	2006 Göteborg	4 × 400 m
Silver medal – second place	2010 Barcelona	400 m hurdles
Bronze medal – third place	2006 Göteborg	400 m hurdles
Representing Wales
Commonwealth Games
Bronze medal – third place	2010 Delhi	400 m hurdles

Rhys Williams (born 27 February 1984), is a former track and field athlete from Wales, who specialised in the 400 m hurdles and competed at the 2012 Summer Olympics. He is a previous European champion in the event.

== Early life ==
Williams was born in Bridgend, the son of former Welsh international rugby union player J.J. Williams. Rhys studied at Ysgol Gyfun Llanhari from September 1995 until June 2002. He was a member of the Bridgend and District D.C. Thomas winning rugby side at the age of 11 and was also the Welsh U15 backstroke swimming champion.

== Athletics career ==
Williams won the 400 m hurdles at the 2005 European U23 Championships, was European Junior Champion in 2003, and won the European Youth Olympics in 2001.

On 10 August 2006, Williams won the bronze medal at the European Championships in Athletics in Gothenburg in a time of 49.12 seconds, thus just slightly missing his personal best (49.09, set at the 2006 Commonwealth Games in Melbourne, where he finished fourth). He also ran 48.3 over the 400 m (2002). On 13 August 2006 at that same event, he won a silver medal in the 4 × 400 m relay as the second sprinter, along with Robert Tobin, Graham Hedman and Timothy Benjamin, in a time of 3:01.63. Also in 2006, he became the British 400 metres hurdles champion after winning the British AAA Championships in 2006.

On 31 July 2010, he achieved a silver medal in the 400 m hurdles at the European Athletics Championships in Barcelona, with fellow Welshman Dai Greene winning gold and at the 2012 Olympic Games in London, he represented Great Britain in the 400 metres hurdles.

== Injuries ==
On 17 June 2008 it was announced that he would miss the 2008 Olympics due to a stress fracture to his right foot. He suffered the injury while taking part in the Welsh Championships two days earlier, which was the first time he had competed since suffering a similar injury a year earlier.

== Doping violation ==
On 25 July 2014, on the second day of the 2014 Commonwealth Games where he was co-captain of the Welsh team, it was announced that he was suspended from all competition because of a doping violation at the Glasgow Grand Prix on 11 July. In January 2015 UK Anti-Doping gave Williams a four-month suspension, whilst accepting that Williams' positive test was due to taking a contaminated supplement and that he had not knowingly cheated. As Williams had already been suspended for more than six months the decision meant that he was free to compete again.

== Personal bests ==
Distance	Time	Venue	Date
400 m	46.69 s	Newport	25 May 13
400 m H	48.84 s	Luzern, SUI	17 Jul 13
