= Natalia Rusakova =

Russian sprinter (born 1979)

Medal record

Women's athletics

Representing Russia

European Championships
Bronze medal – third place	2006 Gothenburg	200 metres
Bronze medal – third place	2014 Zürich	4 × 100 m

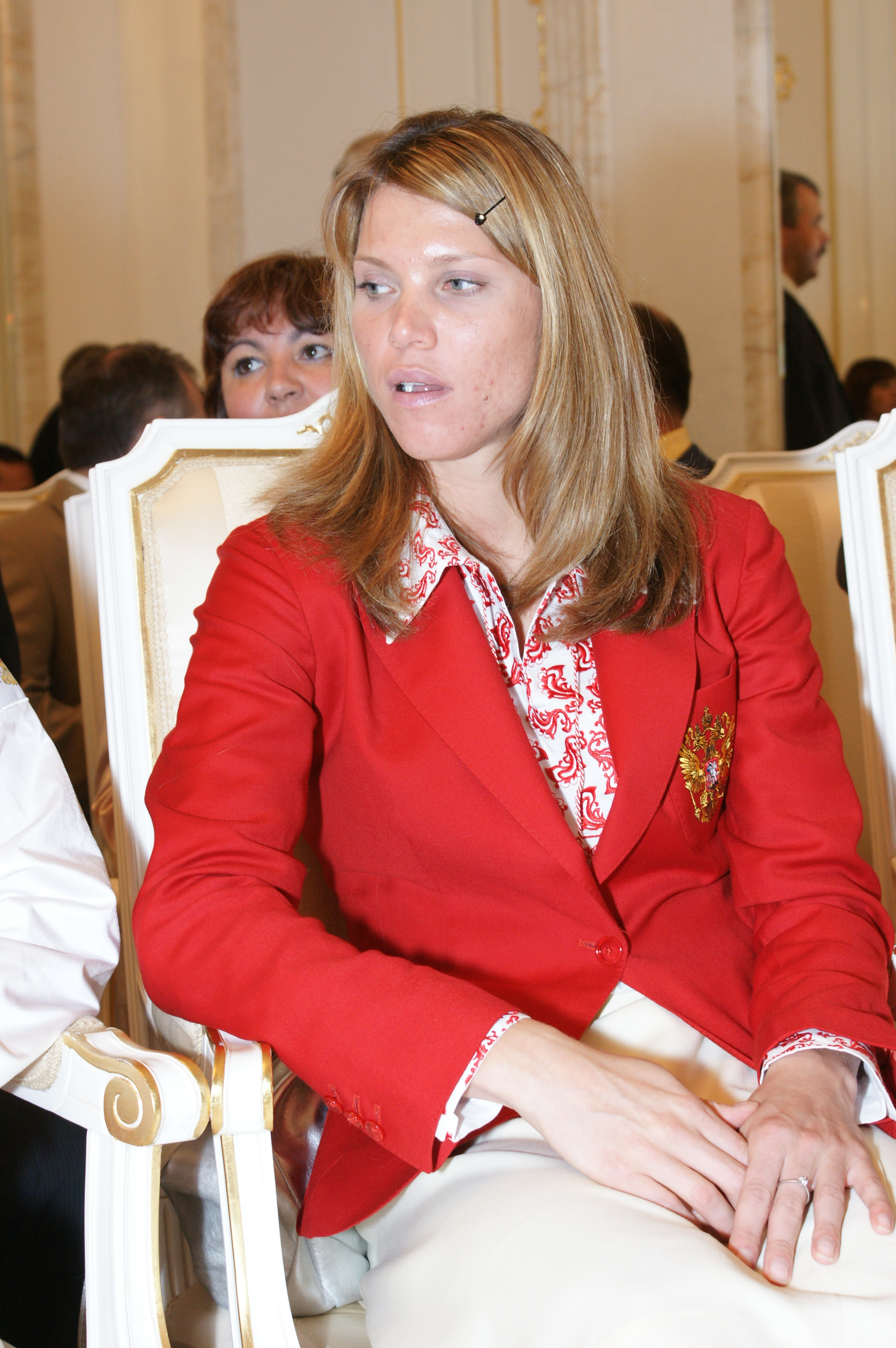
2008

Nataliya Mikhaylovna Kresova-Rusakova, née Kresova, (Russian: Наталья Михайловна Кресова; born 12 December 1979 in Saint Petersburg) is a Russian track and field sprint athlete.

== Career ==
She won the bronze medal in the 200 metres at the 2006 European Athletics Championships in Gothenburg.

She also competed in the 100 metres hurdles at the 2004 Olympics, reaching the semi-finals. In addition she won a bronze medal at the 2003 Summer Universiade in Daegu. Her personal best time is 12.70 seconds, achieved in July 2004 in Lausanne.

Rusakova represented Russia at the 2008 Summer Olympics in Beijing. She competed at the 100 metres sprint and placed fifth in her first round, which normally meant elimination. However, her time of 11.61 seconds was one of the ten fastest losing times, which resulted in qualification for the second round. There she failed to qualify for the semi-finals as her time of 11.49 was the sixth time of her race.

At the 2012 Summer Olympics, she competed in the 200 metres and the 4 × 100 metres, but did not reach the final in either event.
