= Florian Seitz =

German sprinter

Florian Seitz (born 5 August 1982 in Berlin) is a German sprinter who specializes in the 400 metres. He represents OSC Berlin.

He finished fourth with the German 4 × 400 m relay team at the 2005 European Indoor Championships and the 2006 European Championships. The relay team also competed at the 2005 World Championships without reaching the final.

His personal best time is 45.95 seconds, achieved in July 2006 at the German championships in Ulm.
