= Sam Ellis (runner) =

British 800 metres runner from Barnsley

Personal information
- Nationality: British (English)
- Born: 23 June 1982 (age 44)

Sport
- Sport: Athletics
- Event: middle-distance
- Club: Barnsley Athletics Club
Medal record
Men's athletics
Representing Great Britain
European Championships
Bronze medal – third place	2006 Gothenburg	800 m
Representing England
Commonwealth Youth Games
Bronze medal – third place	2000 Edinburgh	400 m

Samuel James Ellis (born 23 June 1982) is a British former 800 metres runner from Barnsley. He won a bronze medal in the 800 m at the 2006 European Athletics Championships. He was coached by Alan Hastey and was on the World Class Podium funding programme.

== Biography ==
Ellis attended Penistone Grammar School and is a graduate from Sheffield Hallam University in Architecture.

Ellis was a member of Barnsley Athletics Club before joining City of Sheffield Athletic Club in 2007 and was formerly a 400m international, achieving a bronze medal at this distance in the 2000 Commonwealth Youth Games held in Edinburgh.

In 2004 he was a surprise winner of the 800m at the 2004 AAA Championships, claiming his first senior AAA gold. Despite the win at the AAAs, which were also used as the Olympic trials, Ellis was not picked for the Olympics that year as he had not achieved the qualifying standard. Two years later, in 2006, Ellis had another successful run at the AAAs, this time winning the silver medal. Earlier in the season Ellis had set a new personal best at 800m of 1:45.67 which was within the qualifying mark for the European Championships held that year. The new personal best and the silver at the AAAs secured Ellis a place at the Europeans in Gothenburg: his first time representing Great Britain at a senior major championships.

At the Europeans, after initially having a poor run in the first round of the competition, only scraping through as a fastest loser in a time 1:47.72 Ellis was more impressive in his semifinal qualifying by right for the final in third place. A tactically well run race in the final and a strong finish lead him to third place and his first major senior medal.

Following on from his performance at the 2006 European Championships, Ellis was picked to represent the Great Britain and Northern Ireland team in the 800m at the Norwich Union International Great Britain v U.S. v Russia v China meeting in Birmingham, held on 19 and 20 August 2006. In the race Ellis finished third for Great Britain, behind an American and a Russian runner, with a time of 1:47.98.

Ellis' highest IAAF world ranking for the 800m is 44, achieved 26 March 2007.

== Personal bests ==
Ellis set his 800 m personal best on 10 June 2006 at Watford. His second fastest time ever over the distance is 1:46.64, set in the European Championship final in Gothenburg on 13 August 2006.

=== Outdoor ===
- 200 m – 22.20 (13 May 2000, Cudworth)
- 400 m – 47.61 (6 May 2002, Bedford)
- 800 m – 1:45.67 (10 Jun 2006, Watford)
- Javelin throw – 55.41 (31 Jul 2004, Cudworth)
- High jump – 1.93 (27 Sep 1998, Grimsby)

=== Indoor ===
- 400m – 48.48 (29 Jan 2006, Sheffield)
- 600m – 1:18.48 (26 Nov 2005, Sheffield)
- 800m – 1:49.33 (19 Feb 2005, Sheffield)
