= Sergey Ivanov (runner) =

Russian long-distance runner

Personal information
- Nationality: Russia
- Born: Sergey Nikolayevich Ivanov; 12 January 1979 (age 47) Laprakasy, Yadrinsky District, Chuvash ASSR, USSR
- Height: 1.75 m (5 ft 9 in)
- Weight: 63 kg (139 lb)

Sport
- Sport: Athletics
- Event: Long-distance running
- Club: Dynamo Chuvasaia

Achievements and titles
- Personal best(s): 5000 m: 13:35.50 (2004); 10,000 m: 27:53.12 (2008)

Sergey Nikolayevich Ivanov (Russian: Серге́й Николаевич Иванов; born 12 January 1979) is a Russian long-distance runner. He set both a national record and a personal best time of 27:53.12 by winning the 10,000 metres at the 2008 Russian Athletics Championships in Kazan, Russia.

Ivanov represented Russia at the 2008 Summer Olympics in Beijing, where he competed for the men's 10,000 metres. He finished the race in thirtieth place by five seconds ahead of Japan's Takayuki Matsumiya, with a time of 28:34.72.
