= Aleksandr Larin =

Russian sprinter

Personal information
- Full name: Aleksandr Aleksandrovich Larin
- Nationality: Russian
- Born: 23 June 1983 (age 43)

Sport
- Sport: Sprinting
- Event: 4 × 400 metres relay

Aleksandr Aleksandrovich Larin (born 23 June 1983) is a Russian sprinter. He competed in the men's 4 × 400 metres relay at the 2004 Summer Olympics.
