= 2006 European Athletics Championships =

19th European Athletics Championships
- Dates: 7–13 August
- Host city: Gothenburg, Sweden
- Venue: Ullevi Stadium
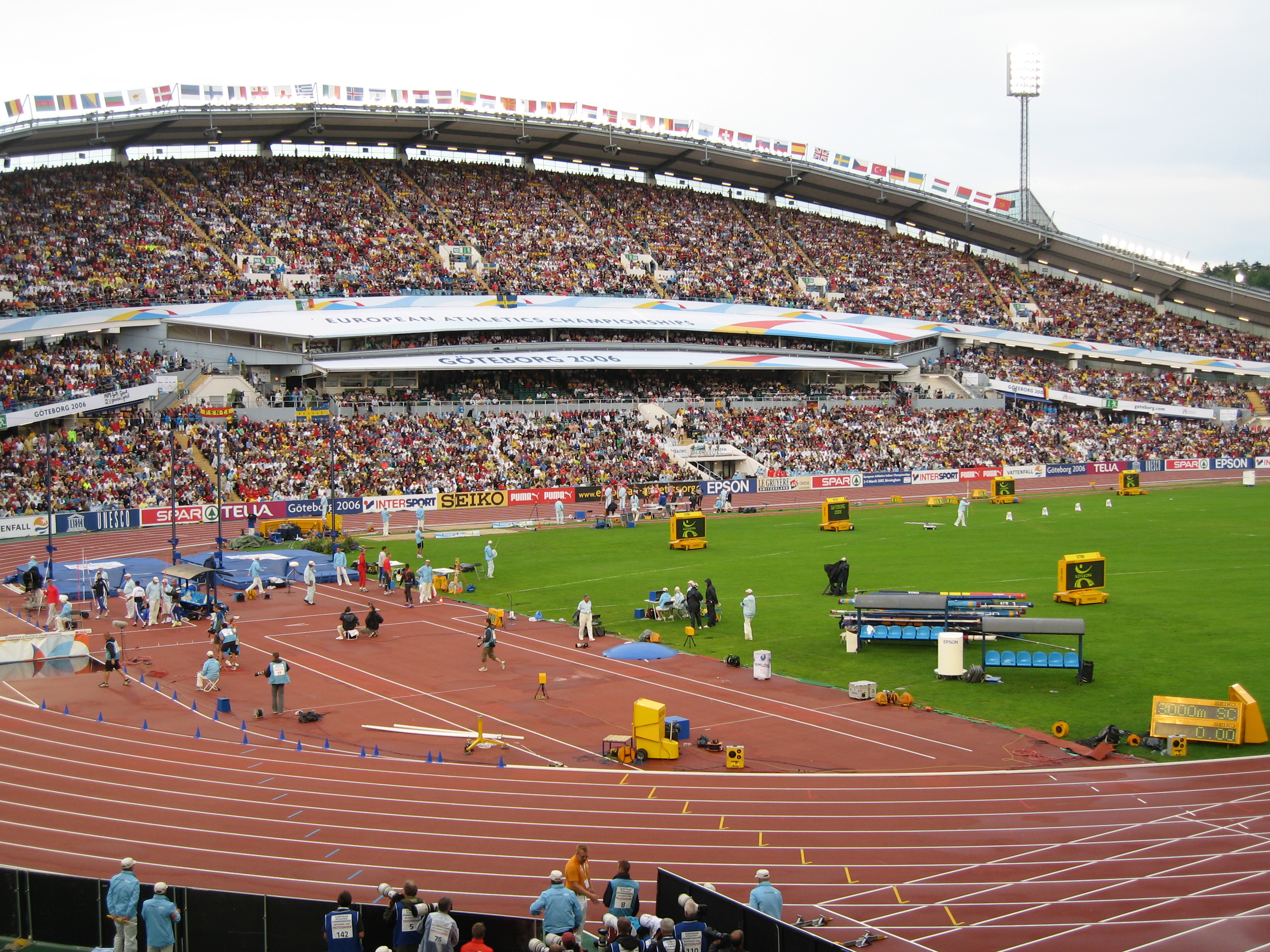
- Level: Senior
- Type: Outdoor
- Events: 47 (men: 24; women: 23)
- Participation: 1,288 athletes from 48 nations

The 19th European Athletics Championships were held in Gothenburg, Sweden, between 7 August and 13 August 2006. The competition arena was the Ullevi Stadium and the official motto "Catch the Spirit". Gothenburg also hosted the 1995 World Championships in Athletics, and Stockholm, Sweden's capital, hosted 1958 European Athletics Championships.

== Men's results ==
=== Track ===
1998 | 2002 | 2006 | 2010 | 2012

Event	Gold		Silver		Bronze	
100 m	Francis Obikwelu; Portugal	9.99; CR	Andrey Yepishin; Russia	10.10; NR	Matic Osovnikar; Slovenia	10.14; NR
200 m	Francis Obikwelu; Portugal	20.01; NR	Johan Wissman; Sweden	20.38; NR	Marlon Devonish; Great Britain	20.54
400 m	Marc Raquil; France	45.02	Vladislav Frolov; Russia	45.09; PB	Leslie Djhone; France	45.40
800 m	Bram Som; Netherlands	1:46.56	David Fiegen; Luxembourg	1:46.59	Sam Ellis; Great Britain	1:46.64
1500 m	Mehdi Baala; France	3:39.02	Ivan Heshko; Ukraine	3:39.50	Juan Carlos Higuero; Spain	3:39.62
5000 m	Jesús España; Spain	13:44.70	Mo Farah; Great Britain	13:44.79	Juan Carlos Higuero; Spain	13:46.48
10,000 m	Jan Fitschen; Germany	28:10.94; PB	José Manuel Martínez; Spain	28:12.06; SB	Juan Carlos de la Ossa; Spain	28:13.73
Marathon	Stefano Baldini; Italy	2:11:32	Viktor Röthlin; Switzerland	2:11:50	Julio Rey; Spain	2:12:37
110 metres hurdles	Staņislavs Olijars; Latvia	13.24	Thomas Blaschek; Germany	13.46	Andy Turner; Great Britain	13.56
400 metres hurdles	Periklis Iakovakis; Greece	48.46	Marek Plawgo; Poland	48.71 SB	Rhys Williams; Great Britain	49.12
3000 metres steeplechase	Jukka Keskisalo; Finland	8:24.89	José Luis Blanco; Spain	8:26.22	Bouabdellah Tahri; France	8:27.15
20 kilometres walk	Paquillo Fernández; Spain	1:19:09	Valeriy Borchin; Russia	1:20:00	João Vieira; Portugal	1:20:09; NR
50 kilometres walk	Yohann Diniz; France	3:41:39; PB	Jesús Ángel García; Spain	3:42:48; SB	Yuriy Andronov; Russia	3:43:26
4 × 100 metres relay	Great Britain; Dwain Chambers; Darren Campbell; Marlon Devonish; Mark Lewis-Francis	38.91	Poland; Przemysław Rogowski; Łukasz Chyła; Marcin Jędrusiński; Dariusz Kuć	39.05	France; Oudéré Kankarafou; Ronald Pognon; Fabrice Calligny; David Alerte	39.07
4 × 400 metres relay	France; Leslie Djhone; Idrissa M'Barke; Naman Keïta; Marc Raquil	3:01.10	Great Britain; Robert Tobin; Rhys Williams; Graham Hedman; Tim Benjamin	3:01.63	Poland; Daniel Dąbrowski; Piotr Kędzia; Piotr Rysiukiewicz; Rafał Wieruszewski	3:01.73
WR world record | AR area record | CR championship record | GR games record | NR national record | OR Olympic record | PB personal best | SB season best | WL world leading (in a given season)

=== Field ===
1998 | 2002 | 2006 | 2010 | 2012

Event	Gold		Silver		Bronze	
High jump	Andrey Silnov; Russia	2.36; CR WL	Tomáš Janků; Czech Republic	2.34; PB	Stefan Holm; Sweden	2.34; SB
Long jump	Andrew Howe; Italy	8.20	Greg Rutherford; Great Britain	8.13	Olexiy Lukashevych; Ukraine	8.12
Pole vault	Aleksandr Averbukh; Israel	5.70	Tim Lobinger; Germany; Romain Mesnil; France	5.65		
Triple jump	Christian Olsson; Sweden	17.67; EL	Nathan Douglas; Great Britain	17.21	Marian Oprea; Romania	17.18
Shot put	Ralf Bartels; Germany	21.13	Joachim Olsen; Denmark	21.09	Rutger Smith; Netherlands	20.90
Discus throw	Virgilijus Alekna; Lithuania	68.67	Gerd Kanter; Estonia	68.03	Aleksander Tammert; Estonia	66.14
Javelin throw	Andreas Thorkildsen; Norway	88.78	Tero Pitkämäki; Finland	86.44	Jan Železný; Czech Republic	85.92
Hammer throw	Olli-Pekka Karjalainen; Finland	80.84; SB	Vadim Devyatovskiy; Belarus	80.76	Markus Esser; Germany	79.19
Decathlon	Roman Šebrle; Czech Republic	8526; SB	Attila Zsivoczky; Hungary	8356	Aleksey Drozdov; Russia	8350; PB
WR world record | AR area record | CR championship record | GR games record | NR national record | OR Olympic record | PB personal best | SB season best | WL world leading (in a given season)

== Women's results ==
=== Track ===
1998 | 2002 | 2006 | 2010 | 2012

Event	Gold		Silver		Bronze	
100 metres	Kim Gevaert; Belgium	11.06	Yekaterina Grigoryeva; Russia	11.22 (SB)	Irina Khabarova; Russia	11.22
200 metres	Kim Gevaert; Belgium	22.68	Yuliya Gushchina; Russia	22.93	Natalya Rusakova; Russia	23.09
400 metres	Vanya Stambolova; Bulgaria	49.85	Tatyana Veshkurova; Russia	50.15	Olga Zaytseva; Russia	50.28
800 metres	Olga Kotlyarova; Russia	1:57.38	Svetlana Klyuka; Russia	1:57.48	Rebecca Lyne; Great Britain	1:58.45
1500 metres	Tatyana Tomashova; Russia	3:56.91 (CR)	Yuliya Chizhenko; Russia	3:57.61	Daniela Yordanova; Bulgaria	3:59.37 (SB)
5000 metres	Marta Domínguez; Spain	14:56.18 (CR)	Liliya Shobukhova; Russia	14:56.57 (SB)	Elvan Abeylegesse; Turkey	14:59.29 (SB)
10,000 metres	Inga Abitova; Russia	30:31.42	Susanne Wigene; Norway	30:32.36	Lidiya Grigoryeva; Russia	30:32.72
Marathon	Ulrike Maisch; Germany	2:30:01 (PB)	Olivera Jevtić; Serbia	2:30:27	Irina Permitina; Russia	2:30:53
100 metres hurdles	Susanna Kallur; Sweden	12.59	Derval O'Rourke; Ireland; Kirsten Bolm; Germany	12.72 (NR Ireland)		
400 metres hurdles	Yevgeniya Isakova; Russia	53.93 (PB)	Fani Chalkia; Greece	54.02	Tetyana Tereshchuk-Antipova; Ukraine	54.55
3000 metres steeplechase	Alesia Turava; Belarus	9:26.05 (SB)	Tatyana Petrova; Russia	9:28.05	Wioletta Janowska; Poland	9:31.62
20 kilometres walk	Ryta Turava; Belarus	1:27:08	Olga Kaniskina; Russia	1:28:35	Elisa Rigaudo; Italy	1:28:37
4 × 100 metres relay	Russia; Yuliya Gushchina; Natalya Rusakova; Irina Khabarova; Yekaterina Grigoryeva	42.71	Great Britain; Anyika Onuora; Emma Ania; Emily Freeman; Joice Maduaka	43.51	Belarus; Yulia Nestsiarenka; Natallia Safronnikava; Alena Neumiarzhitskaya; Aksana Drahun	43.61
4 × 400 metres relay	Russia; Svetlana Pospelova; Natalya Ivanova; Olga Zaytseva; Tatyana Veshkurova	3:25.12	Belarus; Yulyana Zhalniaruk; Sviatlana Usovich; Anna Kozak; Ilona Usovich	3:27.69	Poland; Monika Bejnar; Grażyna Prokopek; Ewelina Sętowska; Anna Jesień	3:27.77
WR world record | AR area record | CR championship record | GR games record | NR national record | OR Olympic record | PB personal best | SB season best | WL world leading (in a given season)

=== Field ===
1998 | 2002 | 2006 | 2010 | 2012

Event	Gold		Silver		Bronze	
High jump	Tia Hellebaut; Belgium	2.03 (CR/NR)	Venelina Veneva; Bulgaria	2.03 (CR)	Kajsa Bergqvist; Sweden	2.01
Pole vault	Yelena Isinbayeva; Russia	4.80 (CR)	Monika Pyrek; Poland	4.65	Tatyana Polnova; Russia	4.65 (SB)
Long jump	Lyudmila Kolchanova; Russia	6.93	Naide Gomes; Portugal	6.84	Oksana Udmurtova; Russia	6.69
Triple jump	Tatyana Lebedeva; Russia	15.15	Hrysopiyi Devetzi; Greece	15.05	Anna Pyatykh; Russia	15.02
Shot put	Natallia Kharaneka; Belarus	19.43	Petra Lammert; Germany	19.17	Olga Ryabinkina; Russia	19.02
Discus throw	Darya Pishchalnikova; Russia	65.55 (PB)	Franka Dietzsch; Germany	64.35	Nicoleta Grasu; Romania	63.58
Hammer throw	Tatyana Lysenko; Russia	76.67 (CR)	Gulfiya Khanafeyeva; Russia	74.50	Kamila Skolimowska; Poland	72.58
Javelin throw	Steffi Nerius; Germany	65.82 (SB)	Barbora Špotáková; Czech Republic	65.64	Mercedes Chilla; Spain	61.98 (SB)
Heptathlon	Carolina Klüft; Sweden	6740 (CR)	Karin Ruckstuhl; Netherlands	6423 (NR)	Lilli Schwarzkopf; Germany	6420 (PB)
WR world record | AR area record | CR championship record | GR games record | NR national record | OR Olympic record | PB personal best | SB season best | WL world leading (in a given season)

== Medal table ==
Rank	Nation	Gold	Silver	Bronze	Total
1	Russia	12	12	11	35
2	Germany	4	5	2	11
3	France	4	1	3	8
4	Spain	3	3	5	11
5	Belarus	3	2	1	6
6	Sweden	3	1	2	6
7	Belgium	3	0	0	3
8	Portugal	2	1	1	4
9	Finland	2	1	0	3
10	Italy	2	0	1	3
11	Great Britain	1	5	5	11
12	Czech Republic	1	2	1	4
13	Greece	1	2	0	3
14	Bulgaria	1	1	1	3
14	Netherlands	1	1	1	3
16	Norway	1	1	0	2
17	Israel	1	0	0	1
17	Latvia	1	0	0	1
17	Lithuania	1	0	0	1
20	Poland	0	3	4	7
21	Ukraine	0	1	2	3
22	Estonia	0	1	1	2
23	Denmark	0	1	0	1
23	Hungary	0	1	0	1
23	Ireland	0	1	0	1
23	Luxembourg	0	1	0	1
23	Serbia	0	1	0	1
23	Switzerland	0	1	0	1
29	Romania	0	0	2	2
30	Slovenia	0	0	1	1
30	Turkey	0	0	1	1
Totals (31 entries)		47	49	45	141

== Participants ==
- Albania
- Andorra
- Austria
- Azerbaijan
- Belarus
- Belgium
- Bosnia & Herzegovina
- Bulgaria
- Croatia
- Cyprus
- Czech Republic
- Denmark
- Estonia
- Finland
- France
- Georgia
- Germany
- Gibraltar
- Great Britain and Northern Ireland
- Greece
- Hungary
- Iceland
- Ireland
- Israel
- Italy
- Latvia
- Lithuania
- Luxembourg
- F.Y.R Macedonia
- Malta
- Moldova
- Monaco
- Montenegro
- Netherlands
- Norway
- Poland
- Portugal
- Romania
- Russia
- San Marino
- Serbia
- Slovakia
- Slovenia
- Spain
- Sweden
- Switzerland
- Turkey
- Ukraine

== Trivia ==
- The official song of the contest is Heroes by Helena Paparizou - winner Eurovision Song Contest 2005 with song „My number one" in Kyiv, Ukraine. Song „Heroes" used in opening ceremony (performed by Helena Paparizou and in an instrumental form during an artistic and pyrotechnic show) and tv intro that event make by public broadcaster SVT. The intro of the event, prepared by the Swedish public broadcaster, presented ice cubes with the logo of the organizing broadcaster, the names of the participating countries and a map of Europe with a focus on the locations of the city of Gothenburg. The dice appeared on the background of athletic competitors and the background itself was gray. The following part presents the organizing city, its inhabitants and the arena of the European Athletics Championships in Gothenburg. At the end of the intro, the event logo was formed. The musical setting of the intro was a melody from the official anthem of the event, recorded as an instrumental.
- The BBC have chosen to use Carola Häggkvist's 2006 Eurovision Song Contest entry Invincible in instrumental form as the title music for their coverage. They have also used various pop songs including Lena Philipsson's "Lena Anthem" and Lev livet by Magnus Carlsson also in instrumental form.
- Merlene Ottey, at the age of 46 and representing Slovenia, is fifth in the 100 m semifinals, failing to qualify for the finals.
- Olivera Jevtić won Serbia's first athletics medal as an independent country, a silver in women's marathon.
