= Emma Ania =

British sprinter

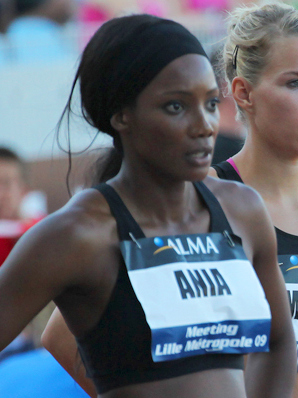
- Ania in 2009

Personal information
- Nationality: British (English)
- Born: 7 February 1980 (age 46) Islington, London
- Height: 173 cm (5 ft 8 in)
- Weight: 63 kg (139 lb)

Sport
- Sport: Athletics
- Event: Sprints
- Club: Shaftesbury Barnet Harriers

Emma Iwebunor Ania is a former track and field sprint athlete who competed internationally for Great Britain.

== Biography ==
Ania attended St Thomas More School, Wood Green and studied biology at Brunel University. She finished third behind Abi Oyepitan in the 100 metres event at the 2004 AAA Championships.

Ania represented Great Britain at the 2008 Summer Olympics in Beijing. She competed at the 4×100 metres relay together with Jeanette Kwakye, Montell Douglas and Emily Freeman. In their first round heat they placed second behind Belgium and in front of Brazil and Nigeria. Their time of 43.02 seconds was the fourth time overall out of sixteen participating nations. With this result they qualified for the final in which they did not finish due to a mistake in the baton exchange.
