= Robert Tobin =

English sprinter (born 1983)

Rob Tobin
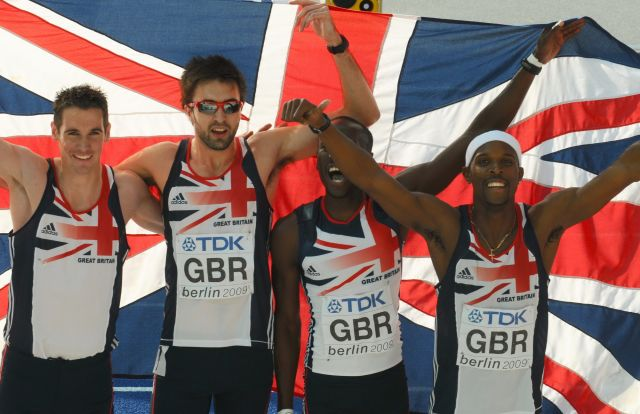
- Tobin (left) with the GB 4 × 400 m team at the World Championships in 2009

Personal information
- Nationality: British (English)
- Born: 20 December 1983 (age 42) Lincoln, England
- Height: 190 cm (6 ft 3 in)
- Weight: 78 kg (172 lb)

Sport
- Sport: Athletics
- Event: 400m
- Club: Basingstoke & Mid Hants AC
Medal record
Representing Great Britain
Olympic Games
Bronze medal – third place	2008 Beijing	4 × 400 m relay
World Championships
Silver medal – second place	2009 Berlin	4 × 400 m relay
European Championships
Silver medal – second place	2006 Gothenburg	4 × 400 m relay
Silver medal – second place	2010 Barcelona	4 × 400 m relay
Silver medal – second place	2012 Helsinki	4 × 400 m relay
European Indoor Championships
Gold medal – first place	2007 Birmingham	4 × 400 m relay
Bronze medal – third place	2007 Birmingham	400 m
Commonwealth Games
Bronze medal – third place	2010 Delhi	4 × 400 m relay

Robert John Tobin (born 20 December 1983) is an English former sprinter and 400 metres runner who competed at the 2008 Summer Olympics.

== Biography ==
Tobin was the youngest of two children born to Jacqueline (née Chidlow) and John Tobin. His talent was honed in his youth at the Basingstoke and Mid Hants Athletic Club and has a PB in the 400 m of 45.01 seconds.

At the 2006 European Athletics Championships in Gothenburg, he won the silver medal in the 4 × 400 m relay along with Rhys Williams, Graham Hedman and Timothy Benjamin, in a time of 3 minutes and 1.63 seconds. He won the bronze medal in the 400 m at the 2007 European Athletics Indoor Championships in Birmingham, also in the same championships picking up a gold in the 4 × 400 m. In 2009 in the World Athletic Championships in Berlin, he was part of the silver medal-winning 4 × 400 relay team. 2010 saw him picking up two medals a silver in the European Athletics Championships and a bronze representing England at the 2010 Commonwealth Games in Delhi.

He has been to two Olympic Games (Athens, Beijing and London), with Beijing bringing back his best performance in an Olympic Games of third in the 4 × 400, in a time of 2 minutes 58.81 seconds with Andrew Steele, Michael Bingham and Martyn Rooney.

Tobin became the British 400 metres champion after winning the British Athletics Championships in 2009.
