= Naman Keïta =

French athlete (born 1978)

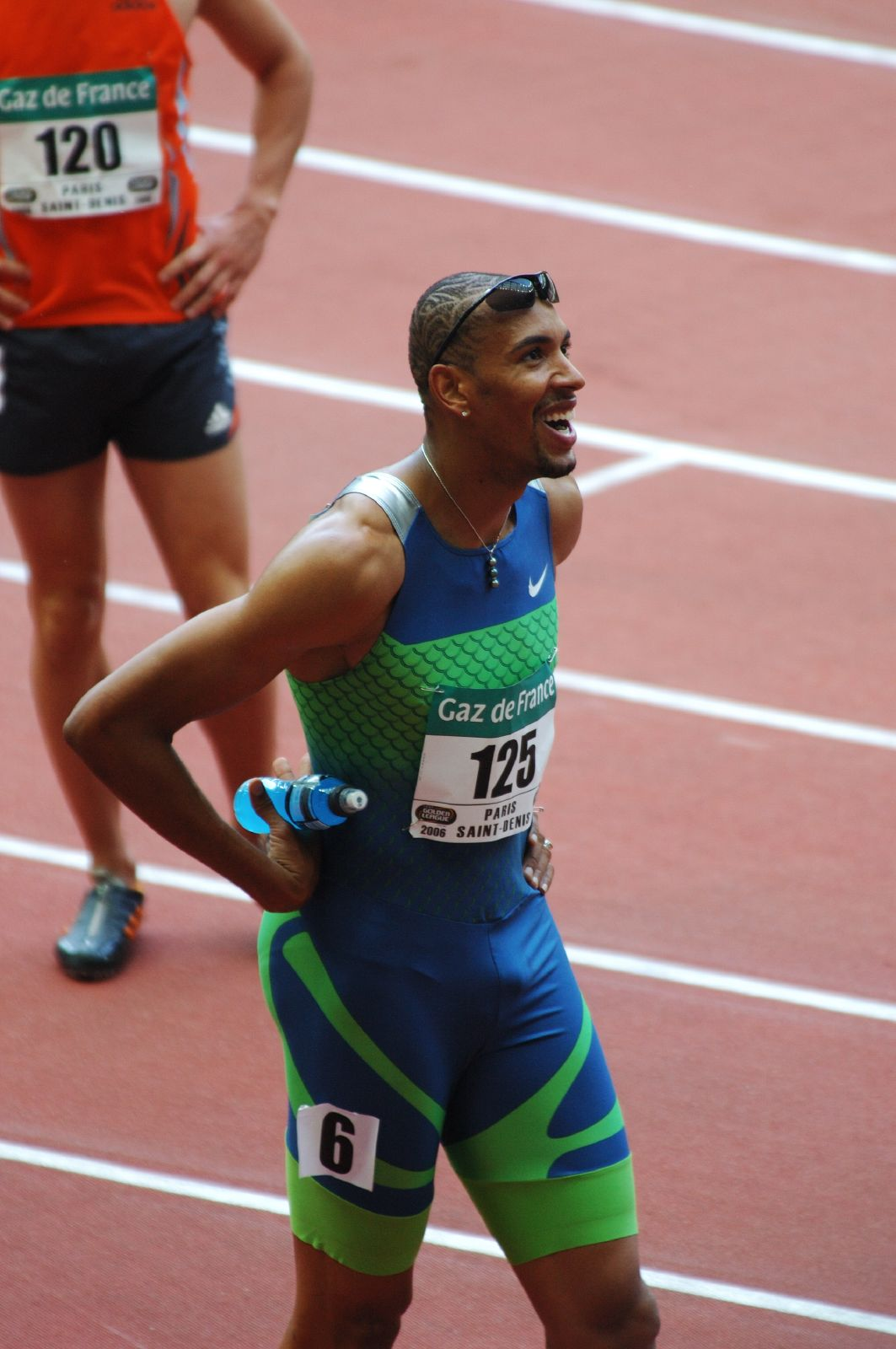
- Naman Keïta at the Golden League 2006, Gaz de France

Medal record

Men's athletics

Representing France

Olympic Games
Bronze medal – third place	2004 Athens	400 m hurdles

World Championships
Gold medal – first place	2003 Paris	4 × 400 m relay

European Championships
Gold medal – first place	2006 Gothenburg	4 × 400 m relay
Bronze medal – third place	2002 Munich	4 × 400 m relay

Naman Keïta (born 9 April 1978 in Paris, France) is a track and field athlete, who takes part in the 400 m hurdles and 4 × 400 m relay, competing internationally for France. He won the 4 × 400 m relay gold medal at the 2003 World Championships in Paris, France. He was the bronze medalist in the 400 metres hurdles at the 2004 Olympic Games in Athens, Greece. Besides, he won a gold medal and a bronze medal in the 4 × 400 m relay at the European Athletics Championships.

== Personal ==
Keïta was born in Paris to a Malian father and an Algerian mother. His hobbies are cooking and jazz music.

== Career ==
Naman Keïta started running while in primary school. He worked for six months as a postman, before stopping to focus his energies on the World Championships and Olympic Games. He is able to use a 12 stride pattern between the hurdles. He competed internationally for Mali until the end of 1999, when he switched his allegiance to France.

He finished fourth in the 400 m hurdles final at the 2006 European Athletics Championships.

Keïta tested positive for a prohibited substance (testosterone) while taking part in the 2007 World Athletics Championship in Osaka, Japan. He was suspended from all competitions for two years by the Fédération française d'athlétisme in October 2007, with the suspension taking effect from 1 Sep 2007.

== See also ==
- List of sportspeople sanctioned for doping offences
