= Graham Hedman =

British sprinter (born 1979)

Personal information
- Nationality: British (English)
- Born: 6 February 1979 (age 46) Witham, Essex, England

Sport
- Sport: Athletics
- Event: 400m
- Club: Woodford Green with Essex Ladies

Graham Lee Hedman (born 6 February 1979) is a British former sprinter.

== Biography ==
Hedman finished third behind Tim Benjamin and Malachi Davis at the 2005 AAA Championships.

At the 2006 European Athletics Championships in Gothenburg, he won the silver medal in the 4 × 400 m relay along with Robert Tobin, Rhys Williams and Timothy Benjamin, in a time of 3:01.63.

In 2010 he was part of the relay squad who won silver at the European Championships in Barcelona, and bronze at the Commonwealth Games in Delhi.

== Personal bests ==
- 100 m – 10.64 sec (2004) (10.45w 2004)
- 200 m – 21.02 (2004) (21.01w 2010)
- 400 m – 45.84 (2006)
