= 2007 European Athletics U23 Championships – Men's 4 × 400 metres relay =

The men's 4 x 400 metres relay event at the 2007 European Athletics U23 Championships was held in Debrecen, Hungary, at Gyulai István Atlétikai Stadion on 14 and 15 July.

== Medalists ==
Gold	Maksim Dyldin; Denis Alekseyev; Artem Sergeyenkov; Anton Kokorin; Russia
Silver	Grzegorz Klimczyk; Patryk Baranowski; Piotr Dąbrowski; Kacper Kozłowski; Poland
Bronze	Jonas Plass; Florian Schwalm; Matthias Bos; Martin Grothkopp; Germany

== Results ==
=== Final ===
15 July

Rank	Nation	Competitors	Time	Notes
1st place, gold medalist(s)	Russia	Maksim Dyldin; Denis Alekseyev; Artem Sergeyenkov; Anton Kokorin	3:02.13	CR
2nd place, silver medalist(s)	Poland	Grzegorz Klimczyk; Patryk Baranowski; Piotr Dąbrowski; Kacper Kozłowski	3:04.76	
3rd place, bronze medalist(s)	Germany	Jonas Plass; Florian Schwalm; Matthias Bos; Martin Grothkopp	3:05.25	
4	Czech Republic	Marek Hrubý; Pavel Jiráň; Theodor Jareš; Petr Klofáč	3:05.71	
5	Great Britain	Jeffrey Lawal-Balogun; Richard Hill; Ben Carne; Richard Buck	3:07.06	
6	Hungary	Miklós Szebeny; Dávid Takács; László Bartha; Balázs Molnár	3:07.08	
7	Spain	Aitor Martín; Mark Ujakpor; Mohamed Amin Hamdoum; Diego Gómez	3:08.63	
8	Romania	Constantin Țucă; Stefan Pavel; Dan Dancianu; Vasile Boboș	3:09.18	

=== Heats ===
14 July
Qualified: first 2 in each heat and 4 best to the Final

==== Heat 1 ====
Rank	Nation	Competitors	Time	Notes
1	Russia	Maksim Dyldin; Aleksandr Sigalovskiy; Artem Sergeyenkov; Anton Kokorin	3:05.25	Q
2	Poland	Grzegorz Klimczyk; Patryk Baranowski; Piotr Dąbrowski; Kacper Kozłowski	3:06.23	q
3	Spain	Mark Ujakpor; Aitor Martín; Mohamed Amin Hamdoum; Diego Gómez	3:09.27	q
4	Romania	Dan Dancianu; Constantin Țucă; Vasile Boboș; Stefan Pavel	3:10.26	Q
	France	Numidia Kadri; Benjamin Chevrol; Yoan Décimus; Teddy Venel	DQ	IAAF Rule 170.14

==== Heat 2 ====
Rank	Nation	Competitors	Time	Notes
1	Czech Republic	Marek Hrubý; Pavel Jiráň; Theodor Jareš; Petr Klofáč	3:07.43	Q
2	Germany	Jonas Plass; Florian Schwalm; Sebastian Schäfer; Martin Grothkopp	3:07.69	Q
3	Great Britain	Dai Greene; Richard Hill; Darren St. Clair; Richard Buck	3:08.26	q
4	Hungary	Miklós Szebeny; Dávid Takács; László Bartha; Balázs Molnár	3:08.40	q
5	Italy	Isalbet Juarez; Lukas Rifesser; Marco Vistalli; Teo Turchi	3:11.51	
	Sweden	Joni Jaako; Fredrik Johansson; Tor Pöllänen; Niklas Larsson	DQ	IAAF Rule 145

== Participation ==
According to an unofficial count, 48 athletes from 11 countries participated in the event.

- Czech Republic (4)
- France (4)
- Germany (5)
- Great Britain (6)
- Hungary (4)
- Italy (4)
- Poland (4)
- Romania (4)
- Russia (5)
- Spain (4)
- Sweden (4)
