= Athletics at the 2012 Summer Olympics – Men's 400 metres hurdles =

Men's 400 metres hurdles at the Games of the XXX Olympiad
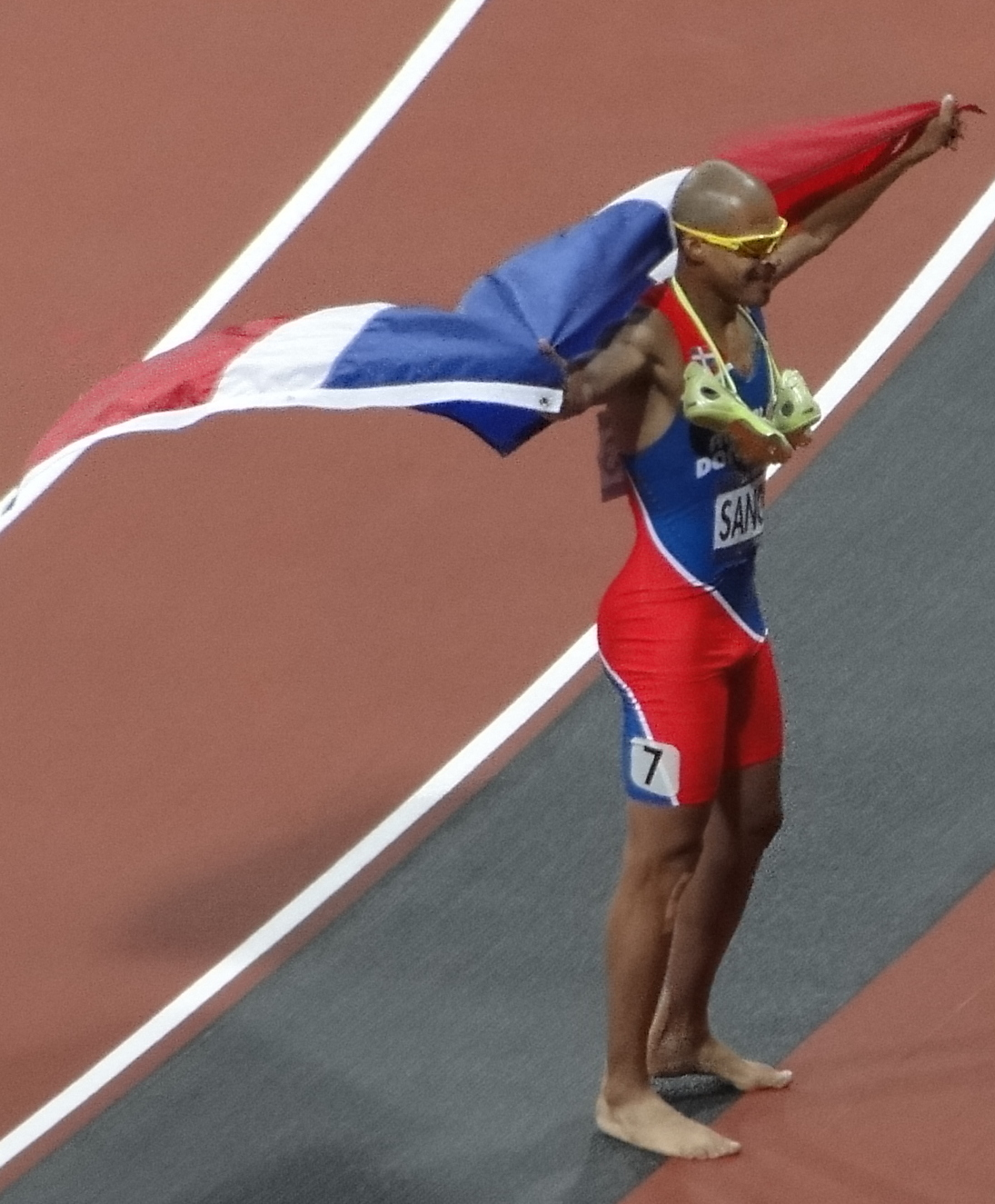
- Félix Sánchez
- Venue: Olympic Stadium
- Dates: 3–6 August
- Competitors: 49 from 33 nations
- Winning time: 47.63

Medalists
1st place, gold medalist(s)		Félix Sánchez; Dominican Republic
2nd place, silver medalist(s)		Michael Tinsley; United States
3rd place, bronze medalist(s)		Javier Culson; Puerto Rico

Official Video

The men's 400 metres hurdles competition at the 2012 Summer Olympics in London, United Kingdom took place on 3–6 August at the Olympic Stadium. There were 49 competitors from 33 nations. The event was won by Félix Sánchez of the Dominican Republic, the second victory in the men's long hurdles for both the man and the nation. Sánchez was the eighth man to win multiple medals in the event and fourth to win two golds. Michael Tinsley of the United States earned silver. Javier Culson's bronze was Puerto Rico's first medal in the event.

== Background ==
This was the 25th time the event was held. It had been introduced along with the men's 200 metres hurdles in 1900, with the 200 being dropped after 1904 and the 400 being held through 1908 before being left off the 1912 programme. However, when the Olympics returned in 1920 after World War I, the men's 400 metres hurdles was back and would continue to be contested at every Games thereafter.

Four of the eight finalists from the 2008 Games returned: gold medalist (and 2000 winner) Angelo Taylor of the United States, silver medalist Kerron Clement of the United States, fifth-place finisher L. J. van Zyl of South Africa, and eighth-place finisher Periklis Iakovakis of Greece. Also returning was the 2004 gold medalist Félix Sánchez of the Dominican Republic, who had not advanced out of the quarterfinals in Beijing 2008. The American team had swept the medals four years earlier; Michael Tinsley won the 2012 U.S. trials to join Taylor and Clement (replacing 2008 bronze medalist Bershawn Jackson on the three-man team). Clement was World Champion in 2007 and 2009. The reigning (2011) world champion was Dai Greene of the host Great Britain. Javier Culson had finished second in both the 2009 and 2011 World Championships. He was a slight favorite among the impressive field.

Comoros, Estonia, Serbia, Togo, Trinidad and Tobago, and Uruguay each made their debut in the event. The United States made its 24th appearance, most of any nation, having missed only the boycotted 1980 Games.

== Summary ==
In the qualifying round, local favorite Dai Greene ran the fastest ever opening round race in the third heat, only to see that mark passed by three athletes in the following heat, led by an eased up Javier Culson. The slowest time qualifier was Kenneth Medwood in 49.78, though Stanislav Melnykov managed to get into the semis automatically with a 50.13 in the slow fifth heat.

With only two automatic qualifiers going to the final from each heat, the first semifinal stacked three former World Champions into one race. Less than a month before his 35th birthday, Félix Sánchez, the 2001 and 2003 World Champion showed he was still in the game, running a season best 47.76. Jehue Gordon upset the form setting the Trinidad and Tobago national record 47.96 in second, leaving 2007 and 2009 World Champion Kerron Clement in 3rd and 2011 World Champion Dai Greene in 4th to hope to qualify on time. The second semi was dominated by world leader Javier Culson and defending champion Angelo Taylor. In the third semi, American trials champion Michael Tinsley and Leford Green separated from the rest of the field. After a nervous wait Clement and Greene made the final on time.

In the final, Taylor, Culson and Sanchez led the way, arriving at the 8th hurdle about even. Taylor took the hurdle awkwardly and started losing ground. While Culson looked to struggle, Sanchez powered away down the stretch for the win, in exactly the same time as his 2004 victory. Tinsley came back from a couple steps back to pass Culson over the last hurdle for the silver, with Greene also trying to make a stretch run to finish fourth.

This was the second ever Olympic medal in Athletics, and the third gold medal overall for the Dominican Republic, the first being Sanchez' in 2004.

In repeating as Olympic champion non-consecutively, Sánchez joined a rare club including Paavo Nurmi, Volodymyr Holubnychy, Heike Drechsler, Nina Romashkova, Edwin Moses (caused by the boycott) and Angelo Taylor. Both Moses and Taylor were in this same event. Ulrike Meyfarth did it remarkably 12 years apart. Ezekiel Kemboi completed such a double the day before and Meseret Defar would complete one four days later.

== Qualification ==
A National Olympic Committee (NOC) could enter up to 3 qualified athletes in the men's 400 metres hurdles event if all athletes met the A standard, or 1 athlete if they met the B standard. The maximum number of athletes per nation had been set at 3 since the 1930 Olympic Congress. The qualifying time standards could be obtained in various meets during the qualifying period that had the approval of the IAAF. Both outdoor meets and indoor meets were eligible. The A standard for the 2012 men's 400 metres hurdles was 49.50 seconds; the B standard was 49.80 seconds. The qualifying period for was from 1 May 2011 to 8 July 2012. NOCs could also have an athlete enter the 400 metres hurdles through a universality place. NOCs could enter one male athlete in an athletics event, regardless of time, if they had no male athletes meeting the qualifying A or B standards in any men's athletic event.

== Competition format ==
The men's 400 metres hurdles competition consisted of quarterfinals, semifinals, and a final. The fastest competitors from each race in the heats qualified for the semifinals along with the fastest overall competitors not already qualified that were required to fill the available spaces in the semifinals. 24 competitors qualified from the heats for the semifinals. There were three semifinals, with the top two runners in each along with the next two fastest overall qualifying for the eight-man final.

== Records ==
Prior to the competition, the existing world record, Olympic record, and world leading time were as follows:

World record	Kevin Young (USA)	46.78	Barcelona, Spain	6 August 1992
Olympic record	Kevin Young (USA)	46.78	Barcelona, Spain	6 August 1992
World Leading	Javier Culson (PUR)	47.78	Paris, France	6 July 2012

The following national records were set during this competition.

Nation	Athlete	Time
Serbia	Emir Bekrić	49.21
Trinidad and Tobago	Jehue Gordon	47.96

== Schedule ==
All times are British Summer Time (UTC+1)

Date	Time	Round
Friday, 3 August 2012	11:15	Quarterfinals
Saturday, 4 August 2012	19:00	Semifinals
Monday, 6 August 2012	20:45	Final

== Results ==
=== Quarterfinals ===
Official Video of First Round

Qual. rule: first 3 of each heat (Q) plus the 6 fastest times (q) qualified.

==== Quarterfinal 1 ====
Rank	Athlete	Nation	Time	Notes
1	Amaurys Valle	Cuba	49.19	Q, PB
2	Brendan Cole	Australia	49.24	Q, PB
3	Amaechi Morton	Nigeria	49.34	Q
4	Kenneth Medwood	Belize	49.78	q
5	Roxroy Cato	Jamaica	50.22	
6	Chen Chieh	Chinese Taipei	50.27	
7	Li Zhilong	China	50.36	
—	Takayuki Kishimoto	Japan	DSQ	

==== Quarterfinal 2 ====
Rank	Athlete	Nation	Time	Notes
1	Michael Tinsley	United States	49.13	Q
2	Leford Green	Jamaica	49.30	Q
3	Kurt Couto	Mozambique	49.31	Q
4	Eric Alejandro	Puerto Rico	49.39	q
5	Rasmus Mägi	Estonia	50.05	
6	Winder Cuevas	Dominican Republic	50.15	SB
—	Akihiko Nakamura	Japan	DSQ	
—	Kariem Hussein	Switzerland	DNS	

==== Quarterfinal 3 ====
Rank	Athlete	Nation	Time	Notes
1	Dai Greene	Great Britain	48.98	Q
2	Emir Bekrić	Serbia	49.21	Q, NR
3	José Reynaldo Bencosme de Leon	Italy	49.35	Q
4	Brent Larue	Slovenia	49.38	q, PB
5	Jamele Mason	Puerto Rico	49.89	
6	Cheng Wen	China	50.38	
7	Vincent Kiplangat Koskei	Kenya	50.80	
8	Cornel Fredericks	South Africa	52.29	
—	Lankantien Lamboni	Togo	DSQ	

==== Quarterfinal 4 ====
Rank	Athlete	Nation	Time	Notes
1	Javier Culson	Puerto Rico	48.33	Q
2	Kerron Clement	United States	48.48	Q, SB
3	Omar Cisneros	Cuba	48.63	Q, SB
4	Tristan Thomas	Australia	49.13	q, SB
5	Rhys Williams	Great Britain	49.17	q, SB
6	Michael Bultheel	Belgium	49.18	q, PB
7	Viacheslav Sakaev	Russia	50.36	
8	Jorge Paula	Portugal	51.40	
9	Maoulida Daroueche	Comoros	53.49	

==== Quarterfinal 5 ====
Rank	Athlete	Nation	Time	Notes
1	Angelo Taylor	United States	49.29	Q
2	Jehue Gordon	Trinidad and Tobago	49.37	Q
3	Stanislav Melnykov	Ukraine	50.13	Q
4	Silvio Schirrmeister	Germany	50.21	
5	Periklis Iakovakis	Greece	50.27	
6	L. J. van Zyl	South Africa	50.31	
7	Josef Prorok	Czech Republic	50.33	
8	Viktor Leptikov	Kazakhstan	51.67	

==== Quarterfinal 6 ====
Rank	Athlete	Nation	Time	Notes
1	Félix Sánchez	Dominican Republic	49.24	Q
2	Jack Green	Great Britain	49.49	Q
3	Mamadou Kasse Hanne	Senegal	49.63	Q
4	Tetsuya Tateno	Japan	49.95	
5	Josef Robertson	Jamaica	49.98	
6	Boniface Mucheru	Kenya	50.33	
7	Artem Dyatlov	Uzbekistan	51.55	
8	Andrés Silva	Uruguay	53.38	

=== Semifinals ===
Official Video of Semifinal Round

Qual. rule: first 2 of each heat (Q) plus the 2 fastest times (q) qualified.

==== Semifinal 1 ====
Rank	Athlete	Nation	Time	Notes
1	Félix Sánchez	Dominican Republic	47.76	Q, SB
2	Jehue Gordon	Trinidad and Tobago	47.96	Q, NR
3	Kerron Clement	United States	48.12	q, SB
4	Dai Greene	Great Britain	48.19	q
5	Mamadou Kasse Hanne	Senegal	48.80	PB
6	Michael Bultheel	Belgium	49.10	PB
7	Eric Alejandro	Puerto Rico	49.15	
8	Kurt Couto	Mozambique	51.55	

==== Semifinal 2 ====
Rank	Athlete	Nation	Time	Notes
1	Javier Culson	Puerto Rico	47.93	Q
2	Angelo Taylor	United States	47.95	Q, SB
3	Omar Cisneros	Cuba	48.23	SB
4	Emir Bekrić	Serbia	49.62	
5	Kenneth Medwood	Belize	49.87	
6	Stanislav Melnykov	Ukraine	50.19	
7	Tristan Thomas	Australia	50.55	
—	Jack Green	Great Britain	DNF	

==== Semifinal 3 ====
Rank	Athlete	Nation	Time	Notes
1	Michael Tinsley	United States	48.18	Q, SB
2	Leford Green	Jamaica	48.61	Q, SB
3	Brent Larue	Slovenia	49.45	
4	Rhys Williams	Great Britain	49.63	
5	Brendan Cole	Australia	49.65	
6	José Reynaldo Bencosme de Leon	Italy	50.07	
7	Amaurys Valle	Cuba	50.48	
—	Amaechi Morton	Nigeria	DSQ	

=== Final ===
Rank	Athlete	Nation	Time	Notes
1st place, gold medalist(s)	Félix Sánchez	Dominican Republic	47.63	WL, SB
2nd place, silver medalist(s)	Michael Tinsley	United States	47.91	PB
3rd place, bronze medalist(s)	Javier Culson	Puerto Rico	48.10	
4	Dai Greene	Great Britain	48.24	
5	Angelo Taylor	United States	48.25	
6	Jehue Gordon	Trinidad and Tobago	48.86	
7	Leford Green	Jamaica	49.12	
8	Kerron Clement	United States	49.15	

== Results summary ==
Rank	Athlete	Nation	Quarterfinals	Semifinals	Final	Notes
1st place, gold medalist(s)	Félix Sánchez	Dominican Republic	49.24	47.76	47.63	WL, SB
2nd place, silver medalist(s)	Michael Tinsley	United States	49.13	48.18	47.91	PB
3rd place, bronze medalist(s)	Javier Culson	Puerto Rico	48.33	47.93	48.10	
4	Dai Greene	Great Britain	48.98	48.19	48.24	
5	Angelo Taylor	United States	49.29	47.95	48.25	SB
6	Jehue Gordon	Trinidad and Tobago	49.37	47.96	48.86	NR
7	Leford Green	Jamaica	49.30	48.61	49.12	SB
8	Kerron Clement	United States	48.48	48.12	49.15	SB
9	Omar Cisneros	Cuba	48.63	48.23	Did not advance	SB
10	Mamadou Kasse Hanne	Senegal	49.63	48.80	Did not advance	PB
11	Michael Bultheel	Belgium	49.18	49.10	Did not advance	PB
12	Eric Alejandro	Puerto Rico	49.39	49.15	Did not advance	
13	Brent Larue	Slovenia	49.38	49.45	Did not advance	PB
14	Emir Bekrić	Serbia	49.21	49.62	Did not advance	NR
15	Rhys Williams	Great Britain	49.17	49.63	Did not advance	SB
16	Brendan Cole	Australia	49.24	49.65	Did not advance	PB
17	Kenneth Medwood	Belize	49.78	49.87	Did not advance	
18	José Reynaldo Bencosme de Leon	Italy	49.35	50.07	Did not advance	
19	Stanislav Melnykov	Ukraine	50.13	50.19	Did not advance	
20	Amaurys Valle	Cuba	49.19	50.48	Did not advance	PB
21	Tristan Thomas	Australia	49.13	50.55	Did not advance	SB
22	Kurt Couto	Mozambique	49.31	51.55	Did not advance	
23	Jack Green	Great Britain	49.49	DNF	Did not advance	
24	Amaechi Morton	Nigeria	49.34	DSQ	Did not advance	
25	Jamele Mason	Puerto Rico	49.89	Did not advance		
26	Tetsuya Tateno	Japan	49.95	Did not advance		
27	Josef Robertson	Jamaica	49.98	Did not advance		
28	Rasmus Mägi	Estonia	50.05	Did not advance		
29	Winder Cuevas	Dominican Republic	50.15	Did not advance		SB
30	Silvio Schirrmeister	Germany	50.21	Did not advance		
31	Roxroy Cato	Jamaica	50.22	Did not advance		
32	Chen Chieh	Chinese Taipei	50.27	Did not advance		
32	Periklis Iakovakis	Greece	50.27	Did not advance		
34	L. J. van Zyl	South Africa	50.31	Did not advance		
35	Boniface Mucheru	Kenya	50.33	Did not advance		
35	Josef Prorok	Czech Republic	50.33	Did not advance		
37	Li Zhilong	China	50.36	Did not advance		
37	Viacheslav Sakaev	Russia	50.36	Did not advance		
39	Cheng Wen	China	50.38	Did not advance		
40	Vincent Kiplangat Koskei	Kenya	50.80	Did not advance		
41	Jorge Paula	Portugal	51.40	Did not advance		
42	Artem Dyatlov	Uzbekistan	51.55	Did not advance		
43	Viktor Leptikov	Kazakhstan	51.67	Did not advance		
44	Cornel Fredericks	South Africa	52.29	Did not advance		
45	Andrés Silva	Uruguay	53.38	Did not advance		
46	Maoulida Daroueche	Comoros	53.49	Did not advance		
47	Takayuki Kishimoto	Japan	DSQ	Did not advance		
47	Lankantien Lamboni	Togo	DSQ	Did not advance		
47	Akihiko Nakamura	Japan	DSQ	Did not advance		
—	Kariem Hussein	Switzerland	DNS	Did not advance		
