= 2007 European Athletics U23 Championships – Men's 400 metres =

The men's 400 metres event at the 2007 European Athletics U23 Championships was held in Debrecen, Hungary, at Gyulai István Atlétikai Stadion on 12 and 13 July.

== Medalists ==
Gold	Denis Alekseyev; Russia
Silver	Željko Vincek; Croatia
Bronze	Kacper Kozłowski; Poland

== Results ==
=== Final ===
13 July

Rank	Name	Nationality	Time	Notes
1st place, gold medalist(s)	Denis Alekseyev	Russia	45.69	
2nd place, silver medalist(s)	Željko Vincek	Croatia	45.69	
3rd place, bronze medalist(s)	Kacper Kozłowski	Poland	45.86	
4	Anton Kokorin	Russia	45.93	
5	Richard Buck	United Kingdom	46.15	
6	Artem Sergeyenkov	Russia	46.19	
7	Fredrik Johansson	Sweden	46.37	
8	Vitaliy Dubonosov	Ukraine	46.69	

=== Semifinals ===
12 July
Qualified: first 4 in each heat to the Final

==== Semifinal 1 ====
Rank	Name	Nationality	Time	Notes
1	Denis Alekseyev	Russia	46.13	Q
2	Kacper Kozłowski	Poland	46.30	Q
3	Anton Kokorin	Russia	46.39	Q
4	Fredrik Johansson	Sweden	46.52	Q
5	Dimitrios Regas	Greece	46.64	
6	Yoan Décimus	France	47.32	
7	Teo Turchi	Italy	47.41	
8	Matthias Bos	Germany	47.75	

==== Semifinal 2 ====
Rank	Name	Nationality	Time	Notes
1	Richard Buck	United Kingdom	46.48	Q
2	Željko Vincek	Croatia	46.57	Q
3	Artem Sergeyenkov	Russia	46.59	Q
4	Vitaliy Dubonosov	Ukraine	46.80	Q
5	Jonas Plass	Germany	47.00	
6	Teddy Venel	France	47.14	
7	Catalin Cîmpeanu	Romania	47.75	
8	Sebastjan Jagarinec	Slovenia	47.77	

=== Heats ===
12 July
Qualified: first 3 in each heat and 4 best to the Semifinals

==== Heat 1 ====
Rank	Name	Nationality	Time	Notes
1	Richard Buck	United Kingdom	46.16	Q
2	Željko Vincek	Croatia	46.68	Q
3	Matthias Bos	Germany	47.07	Q
4	Vitaliy Dubonosov	Ukraine	47.11	q
5	Isalbet Juarez	Italy	47.42	
	Mark Ujakpor	Spain	DNF	

==== Heat 2 ====
Rank	Name	Nationality	Time	Notes
1	Denis Alekseyev	Russia	46.52	Q
2	Dimitrios Regas	Greece	46.69	Q
3	Teddy Venel	France	46.70	Q
4	Catalin Cîmpeanu	Romania	47.02	q
5	Sebastjan Jagarinec	Slovenia	47.18	q
6	Mohamed Amin Hamdoum	Spain	47.81	
7	Yuriy Shapsai	Israel	48.39	

==== Heat 3 ====
Rank	Name	Nationality	Time	Notes
1	Jonas Plass	Germany	47.07	Q
2	Artem Sergeyenkov	Russia	47.35	Q
3	Yoan Décimus	France	47.49	Q
4	Petr Klofáč	Czech Republic	47.80	
5	Aitor Martín	Spain	47.97	
	Richard Strachan	United Kingdom	DNS	

==== Heat 4 ====
Rank	Name	Nationality	Time	Notes
1	Fredrik Johansson	Sweden	46.79	Q
2	Anton Kokorin	Russia	46.82	Q
3	Kacper Kozłowski	Poland	46.83	Q
4	Teo Turchi	Italy	47.08	q
5	Marek Hrubý	Czech Republic	47.59	
6	Numidia Kadri	France	48.05	
7	Stefanos Hadjinicolaou	Cyprus	48.30	

== Participation ==
According to an unofficial count, 25 athletes from 16 countries participated in the event.

- Croatia (1)
- Cyprus (1)
- Czech Republic (2)
- France (3)
- Germany (2)
- Greece (1)
- Israel (1)
- Italy (2)
- Poland (1)
- Romania (1)
- Russia (3)
- Slovenia (1)
- Spain (3)
- Sweden (1)
- Ukraine (1)
- United Kingdom (1)
