= 2009 European Athletics U23 Championships – Men's 400 metres hurdles =

The men's 400 metres hurdles event at the 2009 European Athletics U23 Championships was held in Kaunas, Lithuania, at S. Dariaus ir S. Girėno stadionas (Darius and Girėnas Stadium) on 16, 17, and 18 July.

== Medalists ==
Gold	Lloyd Gumbs; United Kingdom
Silver	Stanislav Melnykov; Ukraine
Bronze	Vincent Vanryckeghem; Belgium

== Results ==
=== Final ===
18 July

Rank	Name	Nationality	Time	Notes
1st place, gold medalist(s)	Lloyd Gumbs	United Kingdom	49.62	
2nd place, silver medalist(s)	Stanislav Melnykov	Ukraine	49.88	
3rd place, bronze medalist(s)	Vincent Vanryckeghem	Belgium	49.90	
4	Hugo Grillas	France	50.02	
5	Silvio Schirrmeister	Germany	50.25	
6	Mickaël François	France	50.25	
7	Stephan Stoll	Germany	50.61	
8	Josef Prorok	Czech Republic	51.02	

=== Semifinals ===
17 July
Qualified: first 3 each heat and 2 fastest to Final

==== Semifinal 1 ====
Rank	Name	Nationality	Time	Notes
1	Vincent Vanryckeghem	Belgium	50.36	Q
2	Hugo Grillas	France	50.37	Q
3	Stephan Stoll	Germany	50.67	Q
4	Spiridon Papadopoulos	Greece	51.21	
5	Radosław Czyż	Poland	51.24	
6	Mikita Yakauleu	Belarus	51.29	
7	Vyacheslav Sakayev	Russia	52.48	
	Toby Ulm	United Kingdom	DNS	

==== Semifinal 2 ====
Rank	Name	Nationality	Time	Notes
1	Stanislav Melnykov	Ukraine	50.05	Q
2	Silvio Schirrmeister	Germany	50.07	Q
3	Lloyd Gumbs	United Kingdom	50.12	Q
4	Mickaël François	France	50.45	q
5	Josef Prorok	Czech Republic	50.48	q
6	Bruno Gualberto	Portugal	51.31	
7	Aarne Nirk	Estonia	51.57	
8	Marius Kranendonk	Netherlands	51.69	

=== Heats ===
16 July
Qualified: first 3 each heat and 4 best to Semifinals

==== Heat 1 ====
Rank	Name	Nationality	Time	Notes
1	Silvio Schirrmeister	Germany	50.83	Q
2	Josef Prorok	Czech Republic	51.03	Q
3	Aarne Nirk	Estonia	51.05	Q
4	Mickaël François	France	51.08	q
5	Radosław Czyż	Poland	51.47	q
6	Attila Nagy	Romania	52.73	
7	Mishael García	Spain	53.02	
8	Alexei Cravcenco	Moldova	53.34	

==== Heat 2 ====
Rank	Name	Nationality	Time	Notes
1	Vyacheslav Sakayev	Russia	50.66	Q
2	Lloyd Gumbs	United Kingdom	51.01	Q
3	Mikita Yakauleu	Belarus	51.63	Q
4	David Gollnow	Germany	51.83	
5	Andrea Gallina	Italy	51.89	
6	Adrien Clemenceau	France	52.02	
7	Krzysztof Klonowicz	Poland	52.02	
8	Fausto Santini	Switzerland	52.20	

==== Heat 3 ====
Rank	Name	Nationality	Time	Notes
1	Stanislav Melnykov	Ukraine	50.67	Q
2	Vincent Vanryckeghem	Belgium	50.70	Q
3	Stephan Stoll	Germany	50.98	Q
4	Spiridon Papadopoulos	Greece	51.11	q
5	Bruno Gualberto	Portugal	51.14	q
6	Leonardo Capotosti	Italy	51.64	
7	Diego Cabello	Spain	52.00	
8	Michael Pfanner	Switzerland	52.54	

==== Heat 4 ====
Rank	Name	Nationality	Time	Notes
1	Hugo Grillas	France	50.97	Q
2	Toby Ulm	United Kingdom	51.08	Q
3	Marius Kranendonk	Netherlands	51.39	Q
4	Javier Sagredo	Spain	51.63	
5	Jarosław Cichosz	Poland	52.35	
6	Valdas Valintėlis	Lithuania	52.35	
7	Jacques Frisch	Luxembourg	52.68	
8	Tarass Shcherenko	Israel	52.75	

== Participation ==
According to an unofficial count, 32 athletes from 21 countries participated in the event.

- Belarus (1)
- Belgium (1)
- Czech Republic (1)
- Estonia (1)
- France (3)
- Germany (3)
- Greece (1)
- Israel (1)
- Italy (2)
- Lithuania (1)
- Luxembourg (1)
- Moldova (1)
- Netherlands (1)
- Poland (3)
- Portugal (1)
- Romania (1)
- Russia (1)
- Spain (3)
- Switzerland (2)
- Ukraine (1)
- United Kingdom (2)
