= 2006 World Junior Championships in Athletics – Men's 4 × 400 metres relay =

The men's 4x400 metres relay event at the 2006 World Junior Championships in Athletics was held in Beijing, China, at Chaoyang Sports Centre on 19 and 20 August.

== Medalists ==
Gold	Quentin Summers; Justin Oliver; Bryshon Nellum; Chris Carter; United States
Silver	Maksim Dyldin; Dmitriy Buryak; Vyacheslav Sakayev; Anton Kokorin; Russia
Bronze	Chris Clarke; Grant Baker; Kris Robertson; Martyn Rooney; United Kingdom

== Results ==
=== Final ===
20 August

Rank	Nation	Competitors	Time	Notes
1st place, gold medalist(s)	United States	Quentin Summers; Justin Oliver; Bryshon Nellum; Chris Carter	3:03.76	
2nd place, silver medalist(s)	Russia	Maksim Dyldin; Dmitriy Buryak; Vyacheslav Sakayev; Anton Kokorin	3:05.13	
3rd place, bronze medalist(s)	United Kingdom	Chris Clarke; Grant Baker; Kris Robertson; Martyn Rooney	3:05.49	
4	Kenya	Silvester Kirwa Meli; Julius Kirwa; Jackson Kivuva; David Rudisha	3:05.54	
5	Belgium	Jonathan Borlée; Jens Panneel; Arnaud Ghislain; Kevin Borlée	3:07.03	
6	Jamaica	Allodin Fothergill; Edino Steele; Ramone McKenzie; Tarik Edwards	3:08.28	
7	Poland	Marcin Klaczański; Krzysztof Tylkowski; Piotr Adamcewicz; Grzegorz Sobiński	3:09.19	
8	Japan	Mitsuhiro Abiko; Yusuke Ishitsuka; Tetsuji Yamamoto; Yuzo Kanemaru	3:16.61	

=== Heats ===
19 August

==== Heat 1 ====
Rank	Nation	Competitors	Time	Notes
1	United States	Calvin Smith; Rodney Lockhart; Quentin Summers; Bryshon Nellum	3:06.07	Q
2	United Kingdom	Chris Clarke; Kris Robertson; Louis Sellers; Grant Baker	3:07.02	Q
3	France	Yoann Décimus; Mickaël François; Emmanuel Biron; Yannick Fonsat	3:07.76	
4	Czech Republic	Petr Vanek; Josef Prorok; Martin Hrstka; Aleš Veselý	3:08.69	
5	Bahamas	Juan Lewis; Jameson Strachan; Jamaal Butler; Ramon Miller	3:10.71	
6	Denmark	Rasmus Olsen; Anders Bøvling; Daniel Bendix Christensen; Andreas Bube	3:16.94	
	Australia	Alex Bubner; Tristan Garrett; Dylan Grant; Lachlan Renshaw	DQ	

==== Heat 2 ====
Rank	Nation	Competitors	Time	Notes
1	Poland	Marcin Klaczański; Krzysztof Tylkowski; Piotr Adamcewicz; Adam Burgiel	3:07.69	Q
2	Jamaica	Gawain Gray; Allodin Fothergill; Jair Francis; Tarik Edwards	3:08.57	Q
3	South Africa	Pieter Smit; Willem de Beer; Ruaan Grobler; Alvin Samuels	3:08.69	
	Canada	Bryan Barnett; Geoffrey Harris; Reid Gústavson; Andrew Dargie	DQ	
	Germany	Quentin Seigel; Manuel Ilg; Stephan Behr; Eric Krüger	DQ	
	Saudi Arabia	Ismail Al-Sabani; Adel Al-Nasser; Ali Al-Deraan; Bandar Yahya Al-Sharahili	DQ	

==== Heat 3 ====
Rank	Nation	Competitors	Time	Notes
1	Russia	Maksim Dyldin; Dmitriy Buryak; Dmtriy Yefimov; Anton Kokorin	3:05.59	Q
2	Kenya	Silvester Kirwa Meli; Julius Kirwa; Jackson Kivuva; David Rudisha	3:05.72	Q
3	Belgium	Jens Panneel; Kevin Borlée; Arnaud Ghislain; Jonathan Borlée	3:05.74	q
4	Japan	Tetsuji Yamamoto; Mitsuhiro Abiko; Masato Yokota; Yuzo Kanemaru	3:07.27	q
5	Trinidad and Tobago	Jovon Toppin; Ade Alleyne-Forte; Jamaal James; Renny Quow	3:08.27	
6	Spain	Guillermo García; Aitor Martín; Jesús Pérez; Álvaro Rodríguez	3:16.56	

== Participation ==
According to an unofficial count, 84 athletes from 19 countries participated in the event.

- Australia (4)
- Bahamas (4)
- Belgium (4)
- Canada (4)
- Czech Republic (4)
- Denmark (4)
- France (4)
- Germany (4)
- Jamaica (6)
- Japan (5)
- Kenya (4)
- Poland (5)
- Russia (5)
- Saudi Arabia (4)
- South Africa (4)
- Spain (4)
- Trinidad and Tobago (4)
- United Kingdom (5)
- United States (6)
