= Athletics at the 2011 Summer Universiade – Men's 400 metres hurdles =

International sporting competition

The men's 400 metres hurdles event at the 2011 Summer Universiade was held on 17–19 August.

== Medalists ==
Gold	Silver	Bronze
Jeshua Anderson; United States	Takayuki Kishimoto; Japan	Kurt Couto; Mozambique

== Results ==
=== Heats ===
Qualification: First 4 of each heat (Q) and the next 4 fastest (q) qualified for the semifinals.

Rank	Heat	Name	Nationality	Time	Notes
1	1	Jeshua Anderson	United States	49.78	Q
2	1	Michaël Bultheel	Belgium	49.87	Q, SB
3	1	Aleksey Pogorelov	Russia	50.71	Q
4	2	João Ferreira	Portugal	50.88	Q
5	1	Gabriel El Hanbli	Canada	50.92	Q
6	4	Richard Davenport	Great Britain	51.08	Q
7	2	Kurt Couto	Mozambique	51.14	Q
8	2	Niall Flannery	Great Britain	51.25	Q
9	5	Takatoshi Abe	Japan	51.27	Q
10	3	Takayuki Kishimoto	Japan	51.29	Q
11	4	Emir Bekrić	Serbia	51.46	Q
12	1	Chen Dayu	China	51.50	q
13	5	Jorge Paula	Portugal	51.52	Q
14	2	Rasmus Mägi	Estonia	51.55	Q
15	2	Silvestras Guogis	Lithuania	51.65	q, SB
16	3	Nils Duerinck	Belgium	51.69	Q
17	3	Viacheslav Sakaev	Russia	51.71	Q
18	5	Leonardo Capotosti	Italy	51.86	Q
19	4	Giacomo Panizza	Italy	51.91	Q
20	4	Pieter Beneke	South Africa	51.92	Q
21	5	Johannes Maritz	Namibia	52.22	Q
22	1	Robert Dwumfour	Ghana	52.24	q, SB
22	5	Fausto Santini	Switzerland	52.24	q
24	1	Lee Roy Bock	Namibia	52.35	PB
25	4	Marko Macuh	Slovenia	52.37	
26	3	Chen Chieh	Chinese Taipei	52.39	Q
27	3	Atilla Nagy	Romania	52.42	
28	2	Jonathan Puemi	Switzerland	52.63	
29	3	Aarne Nirk	Estonia	52.93	
30	4	Choi Suchang	South Korea	54.09	
31	5	Michael Cochrane	New Zealand	55.98	
32	3	Abdou Ahmed Masrahi	Saudi Arabia	56.73	
	2	Mohammed Ali Dakkam	Saudi Arabia	DQ	168.7b

=== Semifinals ===
Official Semifinals Video

Qualification: First 2 of each semifinal (Q) and the next 2 fastest (q) qualified for the final.

Rank	Heat	Name	Nationality	Time	Notes
1	1	Takayuki Kishimoto	Japan	49.53	Q
2	1	Emir Bekrić	Serbia	49.55	Q, NR
3	2	Kurt Couto	Mozambique	49.68	Q
4	2	Jeshua Anderson	United States	49.72	Q
5	2	Michaël Bultheel	Belgium	49.88	q
6	3	Richard Davenport	Great Britain	49.89	Q
7	3	Jorge Paula	Portugal	49.99	Q
8	1	João Ferreira	Portugal	50.07	q, PB
9	1	Rasmus Mägi	Estonia	50.14	PB
10	1	Aleksey Pogorelov	Russia	50.50	
11	3	Nils Duerinck	Belgium	50.80	
12	2	Pieter Beneke	South Africa	50.82	
13	3	Takatoshi Abe	Japan	50.96	
14	3	Gabriel El Hanbli	Canada	51.00	
15	2	Viacheslav Sakaev	Russia	51.18	
16	1	Leonardo Capotosti	Italy	51.19	
17	3	Chen Dayu	China	51.30	
18	3	Silvestras Guogis	Lithuania	51.32	SB
19	3	Giacomo Panizza	Italy	51.47	
20	1	Chen Chieh	Chinese Taipei	51.49	
21	1	Fausto Santini	Switzerland	51.77	
21	2	Robert Dwumfour	Ghana	51.77	SB
23	2	Johannes Maritz	Namibia	51.94	
24	2	Niall Flannery	Great Britain	53.86	

=== Final ===
Rank	Lane	Name	Nationality	Time	Notes
1st place, gold medalist(s)	8	Jeshua Anderson	United States	49.03	
2nd place, silver medalist(s)	5	Takayuki Kishimoto	Japan	49.52	
3rd place, bronze medalist(s)	4	Kurt Couto	Mozambique	49.61	
4	2	João Ferreira	Portugal	49.63	PB
5	3	Richard Davenport	Great Britain	49.98	
6	6	Emir Bekrić	Serbia	50.20	
7	7	Jorge Paula	Portugal	50.69	
8	1	Michaël Bultheel	Belgium	54.39	
