= 2011 World Championships in Athletics – Men's 400 metres hurdles =

Men's 400 metres hurdles at the 2011 World Championships
- Venue: Daegu Stadium
- Dates: 29 August (heats); 30 August (semifinals); 1 September (final)
- Competitors: 34
- Winning time: 48.26

Medalists
gold medal	Dai Greene; Great Britain & N.I.
silver medal	Javier Culson; Puerto Rico
bronze medal	L. J. van Zyl; South Africa

Official Video

The Men's 400 metres hurdles event at the 2011 World Championships in Athletics was held at the Daegu Stadium on August 29, 30 and September 1.

In the final, Angelo Taylor in lane 1 and L. J. van Zyl in lane 8 bookended the field going out fast into the lead. As they were completing the final turn, Taylor faltered and started hitting hurdles while Javier Culson powered into the lead. Both van Zyl and Culson slowed going into the final hurdle while David Greene cleared the hurdle with full momentum, cruising past the others to take the gold medal.

== Medalists ==
Gold	Silver	Bronze
Dai Greene; Great Britain & N.I.	Javier Culson; Puerto Rico	L. J. van Zyl; South Africa

== Records ==
World record	Kevin Young (USA)	46.78	Barcelona, Spain	6 August 1992
Championship record	Kevin Young (USA)	47.18	Stuttgart, Germany	19 August 1993
World leading	Louis van Zyl (RSA)	47.66	Pretoria, South Africa	25 February 2011
World leading	Louis van Zyl (RSA)	47.66	Ostrava, Czech Republic	31 May 2011
African record	Samuel Matete (ZAM)	47.10	Zürich, Switzerland	7 August 1991
Asian record	Hadi Soua'an Al-Somaily (KSA)	47.53	Sydney, Australia	27 September 2000
North, Central American and Caribbean record	Kevin Young (USA)	46.78	Barcelona, Spain	6 August 1992
South American record	Bayano Kamani (PAN)	47.84	Helsinki, Finland	7 August 2005
European record	Stéphane Diagana (FRA)	47.37	Lausanne, Switzerland	5 July 1995
Oceanian record	Rohan Robinson (AUS)	48.28	Atlanta, Georgia, United States	31 July 1996

== Qualification standards ==
A time	B time
49.40	49.80

== Schedule ==
Date	Time	Round
August 29, 2011	11:30	Heats
August 30, 2011	19:30	Heats
September 1, 2011	21:30	Final

== Results ==
KEY:	q	Fastest non-qualifiers	Q	Qualified	NR	National record	PB	Personal best	SB	Seasonal best

=== Heats ===
Qualification: First 4 in each heat (Q) and the next 4 fastest (q) advance to the semifinals.

Rank	Heat	Name	Nationality	Time	Notes
1	1	David Greene	Great Britain & N.I.	48.52	Q
1	1	Cornel Fredericks	South Africa	48.52	Q
3	2	L. J. van Zyl	South Africa	48.58	Q
4	2	Isa Phillips	Jamaica	48.64	Q, SB
5	1	Georg Fleischhauer	Germany	48.72	Q, PB
6	2	Félix Sánchez	Dominican Republic	48.74	Q, SB
7	5	Jeshua Anderson	United States	48.81	Q
8	2	Kerron Clement	United States	48.91	Q
9	3	Javier Culson	Puerto Rico	48.95	Q
10	5	Nathan Woodward	Great Britain & N.I.	49.06	Q
11	5	Stanislav Melnykov	Ukraine	49.24	Q, SB
12	3	Angelo Taylor	United States	49.38	Q
13	3	Aleksandr Derevyagin	Russia	49.43	Q, SB
14	5	Leford Green	Jamaica	49.45	Q
15	3	Andrés Silva	Uruguay	49.48	Q
16	2	Vincent Kiplangat Kosgei	Kenya	49.49	q, SB
17	3	Takayuki Kishimoto	Japan	49.51	q
18	1	Emir Bekrić	Serbia	49.67	Q
19	1	Omar Cisneros	Cuba	49.69	q
20	1	Mahau Suguimati	Brazil	49.74	q
21	4	Bershawn Jackson	United States	49.82	Q
22	2	Jorge Paula	Portugal	49.82	
23	5	Kurt Couto	Mozambique	49.86	
24	4	Jehue Gordon	Trinidad and Tobago	49.90	Q
25	2	Jamele Mason	Puerto Rico	49.98	
26	4	Josef Robertson	Jamaica	50.29	Q
27	4	Jack Green	Great Britain & N.I.	50.39	Q
28	3	Li Zhilong	China	50.44	
29	4	Cheng Wen	China	50.51	
30	5	Yuta Imazeki	Japan	50.92	
31	5	Jean Antonio Vieillesse	Mauritius	51.02	
32	4	Kenneth Medwood	Belize	51.19	
33	4	Takatoshi Abe	Japan	51.90	
34	3	Lee Seung-yun	South Korea	52.98	

=== Semifinals ===
Qualification: First 2 in each heat (Q) and the next 2 fastest (q) advance to the final.

Rank	Heat	Name	Nationality	Time	Notes
1	1	Javier Culson	Puerto Rico	48.52	Q
2	2	David Greene	Great Britain & N.I.	48.62	Q
3	3	Bershawn Jackson	United States	48.80	Q
4	1	Cornel Fredericks	South Africa	48.83	Q
5	1	Angelo Taylor	United States	48.86	q
6	2	Félix Sánchez	Dominican Republic	49.01	Q
7	3	L. J. van Zyl	South Africa	49.05	Q
8	3	Aleksandr Derevyagin	Russia	49.07	q, SB
9	2	Jehue Gordon	Trinidad and Tobago	49.08	
10	2	Isa Phillips	Jamaica	49.16	
11	3	Leford Green	Jamaica	49.29	
12	1	Jeshua Anderson	United States	49.33	
13	3	Georg Fleischhauer	Germany	49.36	
14	3	Nathan Woodward	Great Britain & N.I.	49.57	
15	1	Jack Green	Great Britain & N.I.	49.62	
16	2	Andrés Silva	Uruguay	49.63	
17	3	Vincent Kiplangat Kosgei	Kenya	49.71	
18	1	Stanislav Melnykov	Ukraine	49.74	
19	2	Emir Bekrić	Serbia	49.94	
20	1	Takayuki Kishimoto	Japan	50.05	
21	3	Omar Cisneros	Cuba	50.10	
22	1	Josef Robertson	Jamaica	50.39	
23	2	Mahau Suguimati	Brazil	50.89	
24	2	Kerron Clement	United States	52.11	

=== Final ===
Rank	Name	Nationality	Time	Notes
1st place, gold medalist(s)	David Greene	Great Britain & N.I.	48.26	
2nd place, silver medalist(s)	Javier Culson	Puerto Rico	48.44	
3rd place, bronze medalist(s)	L. J. van Zyl	South Africa	48.80	
4	Félix Sánchez	Dominican Republic	48.87	
5	Cornel Fredericks	South Africa	49.12	
6	Bershawn Jackson	United States	49.24	
7	Angelo Taylor	United States	49.31	
8	Aleksandr Derevyagin	Russia	49.32	
