= 2012 USA Indoor Track and Field Championships =

- Dates: February 25–26
- Host city: Albuquerque, New Mexico, United States
- Venue: Albuquerque Convention Center
- Level: Senior
- Type: Indoor
- Events: 26 (men: 13; women: 13)

The 2012 USA Indoor Track and Field Championships was held at Albuquerque Convention Center in Albuquerque, New Mexico. Organized by USA Track and Field (USATF), the two-day competition took place on February 25–26, in conjunction with the USA Indoor Combined Events Championships which started the week after, and served as the national championships in indoor track and field for the United States.

== Medal summary ==
=== Men ===
Event	Gold		Silver		Bronze	
60 meters	Trell Kimmons	6.45	Justin Gatlin	6.47	Dangelo Cherry	6.58
400 meters	Gil Roberts	45.39	Calvin Smith	45.96	Frankie Wright	46.07
800 meters	Duane Solomon	1:48.58	Michael Rutt	1:49.90	Mark Wieczorek	1:49.96
1500 meters	Leonel Manzano	3:48.05	Matthew Centrowitz Jr.	3:48.16	Galen Rupp	3:48.44
3000 meters	Bernard Lagat	7:47.54	Lopez Lomong	7:51.75	Galen Rupp	7:57.36
60 meters hurdles	Aries Merritt	7.43	Kevin Craddock	7.46	Terrence Trammell	7.51
3000 meters race walk	Trevor Barron	11:36.27 CR	Tim Seaman	12:01.48	John Nunn	12:11.86
High jump	Jesse Williams	2.29 m (7 ft 6 in)	Jamie Nieto	2.26 m (7 ft 4 3/4 in)	Keith Moffatt	2.26 m (7 ft 4 3/4 in)
Pole vault	Brad Walker	5.86 m (19 ft 2 1/2 in)	Scott Roth	5.60 m (18 ft 4 1/4 in)	Mark Hollis	5.60 m (18 ft 4 1/4 in)
Long jump	Ashton Eaton	8.06 m (26 ft 5 1/4 in)	William Claye	8.02 m (26 ft 3 1/2 in)	Norris Frederick	7.99 m (26 ft 2 1/2 in)
Triple jump	William Claye	17.63 m (57 ft 10 in)	Christian Taylor	17.21 m (56 ft 5 1/2 in)	Aarik Wilson	16.53 m (54 ft 2 3/4 in)
Shot put	Reese Hoffa	21.75 m (71 ft 4 1/4 in)	Ryan Whiting	21.60 m (70 ft 10 1/4 in)	Christian Cantwell	21.53 m (70 ft 7 1/2 in)
Weight throw	AG Kruger	24.57 m (80 ft 7 1/4 in)	Michael Mai	23.91 m (78 ft 5 1/4 in)	Garland Porter	23.37 m (76 ft 8 in)
Heptathlon	Eric Broadbent	5908 pts	David Klech	5809 pts	Nick Adcock	5796 pts
Masters 800 meters	Nicholas Berra	2:01.61	Christopher Simpson	2:02.77	Brent Jones	2:03.68

=== Women ===
Event	Gold		Silver		Bronze	
60 meters	Tianna Madison	7.02	Barbara Pierre	7.06	Lakya Brookins	7.14
400 meters	Sanya Richards-Ross	50.71 CR	Natasha Hastings	51.66	Dee Dee Trotter	51.68
800 meters	Erica Moore	2:01.08	Phoebe Wright	2:03.07	Latavia Thomas	2:04.50
1500 meters	Jennifer Simpson	4:15.04	Brenda Martinez	4:15.11	Sara Vaughn	4:18.25
3000 meters	Jennifer Simpson	9:19.15	Jackie Areson	9:20.61	Sara Hall	9:21.87
60 meters hurdles	Kristi Castlin	7.84	Vanneisha Ivy	7.93	Gabrielle Mayo	8.04
3000 meters race walk	Maria Michta	13:15.31	Erin Gray	13:15.35	Lauren Forgues	13:21.94
High jump	Chaunté Lowe	2.02 m (6 ft 7 1/2 in) CR	Inika Mcpherson	1.87 m (6 ft 1 1/2 in)	Rebecca Christensen	1.87 m (6 ft 1 1/2 in)
Pole vault	Jennifer Suhr	4.67 m (15 ft 3 3/4 in)	Mary Saxer	4.62 m (15 ft 1 3/4 in)	Lacy Janson	4.62 m (15 ft 1 3/4 in)
Long jump	Janay DeLoach	6.89 m (22 ft 7 1/4 in)	Brittney Reese	6.86 m (22 ft 6 in)	Funmi Jimoh	6.81 m (22 ft 4 in)
Triple jump	Amanda Smock	13.77 m (45 ft 2 in)	Erica McLain	13.74 m (45 ft 3/4 in)	Crystal Manning	13.65 m (44 ft 9 1/4 in)
Shot put	Jillian Camarena-Williams	19.56 m (64 ft 2 in)	Michelle Carter	19.27 m (63 ft 2 1/2 in)	Alyssa Hasslen	17.77 m (58 ft 3 1/2 in)
Weight throw	Amber Campbell	24.78 m (81 ft 3 1/2 in)	Brittany Riley	23.88 m (78 ft 4 in)	Gwendolyn Berry	22.80 m (74 ft 9 1/2 in)
Pentathlon	Sharon Day-Monroe	4567 pts	Abbie Stechschulte	4373 pts	Bettie Wade	4371 pts
Masters 800 meters	Lisa Ryan	2:21.58	Lisa Valle	2:26.71	Karen Steen	2:32.84
