= Dyatlov =

Dyatlov (Russian: Дятлов, from дятел meaning woodpecker) is a Russian masculine surname; its feminine counterpart is Dyatlova. People with the names include:

- Anatoly Dyatlov (1931–1995), Russian nuclear engineer
- Artem Dyatlov (born 1989), Uzbekistani hurdler
- Igor Dyatlov (hiker) (1936–1959), leader of the group of hikers who died in the area of the Urals during the Dyatlov Pass incident
- Natalya Smirnitskaya (née Dyatlova; 1927–2004), Soviet javelin thrower
