= Athletics at the 2009 Summer Universiade – Men's 400 metres hurdles =

The men's 400 metres hurdles event at the 2009 Summer Universiade was held on 8–10 July.

== Medalists ==
Gold	Silver	Bronze
Tristan Thomas; Australia	Kazuaki Yoshida; Japan	Michael Bultheel; Belgium

== Results ==
=== Heats ===
Qualification: First 3 of each heat (Q) and the next 4 fastest (q) qualified for the semifinals.

Rank	Heat	Name	Nationality	Time	Notes
1	1	Michael Bultheel	Belgium	49.78	Q, PB
2	1	Jussi Heikkilä	Finland	50.73	Q
3	1	Abderrahmane Hamadi	Algeria	50.80	Q
4	2	Viktor Leptikov	Kazakhstan	50.99	Q
5	4	Kazuaki Yoshida	Japan	51.15	Q
6	4	Vladimir Guziy	Russia	51.23	Q, PB
7	3	Brendan Cole	Australia	51.45	Q
8	1	Aarne Nirk	Estonia	51.48	q
9	3	Tristan Thomas	Australia	52.26	Q
10	2	Peter Šajn	Slovenia	52.30	Q, PB
11	4	Thomas Carey	Ireland	52.42	Q
12	4	Tuncay Örs	Turkey	52.56	q
13	4	Valdas Valintėlis	Lithuania	52.60	q
14	2	Abdelgadir Abakar	Sudan	52.73	Q
15	3	Cornel Fredericks	South Africa	52.96	Q
16	1	Denis Byvakin	Russia	52.98	
16	3	Valdis Iļjanovs	Latvia	52.98	q
18	4	Emir Bekrić	Serbia	53.16	PB
19	2	Thomas Cortebeeck	Denmark	53.23	PB
20	4	Sotirios Iakovakis	Greece	54.19	
21	2	Li Zhilong	China	54.24	
22	2	Andrejs Romaņivs	Latvia	54.62	
23	3	Niklas Liberg	Sweden	54.81	PB
24	2	Ilija Cvijetić	Bosnia and Herzegovina	54.84	
25	1	Lukungu Waiswa	Uganda	55.12	
26	4	Nikola Marović	Montenegro	55.24	PB
27	1	Hussein Omer Gamal	Qatar	58.67	
28	3	Damir Andjelov	Serbia	59.20	
29	1	Wong Cheok Wa	Macau	1:01.49	SB
	3	Camilo Quevedo	Guatemala	DNS	

=== Semifinals ===
Qualification: First 3 of each semifinal (Q) and the next 2 fastest (q) qualified for the final.

Rank	Heat	Name	Nationality	Time	Notes
1	1	Tristan Thomas	Australia	50.11	Q
2	1	Kazuaki Yoshida	Japan	50.24	Q
3	2	Michael Bultheel	Belgium	50.46	Q
4	2	Brendan Cole	Australia	50.59	Q
5	2	Cornel Fredericks	South Africa	50.79	Q
6	2	Jussi Heikkilä	Finland	50.86	q
7	1	Viktor Leptikov	Kazakhstan	50.94	Q
8	1	Vladimir Guziy	Russia	51.14	q, PB
9	1	Tuncay Örs	Turkey	51.57	
10	1	Thomas Carey	Ireland	52.08	
11	2	Aarne Nirk	Estonia	52.63	
12	2	Peter Šajn	Slovenia	52.88	
13	2	Valdis Iļjanovs	Latvia	53.00	
14	1	Valdas Valintėlis	Lithuania	53.05	
15	1	Abdelgadir Abakar	Sudan	53.51	
	2	Abderrahmane Hamadi	Algeria	DNF	

=== Final ===
Rank	Lane	Name	Nationality	Time	Notes
1st place, gold medalist(s)	3	Tristan Thomas	Australia	48.75	
2nd place, silver medalist(s)	5	Kazuaki Yoshida	Japan	49.78	SB
3rd place, bronze medalist(s)	4	Michael Bultheel	Belgium	49.79	
4	8	Cornel Fredericks	South Africa	49.93	PB
5	6	Brendan Cole	Australia	50.18	
6	2	Jussi Heikkilä	Finland	50.19	
7	7	Viktor Leptikov	Kazakhstan	50.63	
8	1	Vladimir Guziy	Russia	51.41	
