= 2007 European Athletics U23 Championships – Men's 400 metres hurdles =

The men's 400 metres hurdles event at the 2007 European Athletics U23 Championships was held in Debrecen, Hungary, at Gyulai István Atlétikai Stadion on 13 and 14 July.

== Medalists ==
Gold	Dai Greene; United Kingdom
Silver	Fadil Bellaabouss; France
Bronze	Milan Kotur; Croatia

== Results ==
=== Final ===
14 July

Rank	Name	Nationality	Time	Notes
1st place, gold medalist(s)	Dai Greene	United Kingdom	49.58	
2nd place, silver medalist(s)	Fadil Bellaabouss	France	49.58	
3rd place, bronze medalist(s)	Milan Kotur	Croatia	50.14	
4	Ricardo Lima	Portugal	50.48	
5	Ben Carne	United Kingdom	50.83	
6	Vincent Vanryckeghem	Belgium	50.88	
7	Tuncay Örs	Turkey	50.99	
8	Stanislav Melnykov	Ukraine	51.53	

=== Heats ===
13 July
First 2 in each heat and 2 best to the Final

==== Heat 1 ====
Rank	Name	Nationality	Time	Notes
1	Fadil Bellaabouss	France	50.19	Q
2	Ricardo Lima	Portugal	50.44	Q
3	Tuncay Örs	Turkey	51.09	q
4	Vincent Vanryckeghem	Belgium	51.15	q
5	Josef Prorok	Czech Republic	51.16	
6	Aarne Nirk	Estonia	51.26	
7	Ignacio Sarmiento	Spain	52.32	
8	Andreas Bube	Denmark	52.81	

==== Heat 2 ====
Rank	Name	Nationality	Time	Notes
1	Dai Greene	United Kingdom	50.41	Q
2	Milan Kotur	Croatia	50.80	Q
3	Spiridon Papadopoulos	Greece	51.20	
4	Diego Gómez	Spain	51.21	
5	Balázs Molnár	Hungary	51.93	
6	Yuriy Pelles	Israel	52.49	
	Nicola Cascella	Italy	DNF	

==== Heat 3 ====
Rank	Name	Nationality	Time	Notes
1	Ben Carne	United Kingdom	51.58	Q
2	Stanislav Melnykov	Ukraine	51.71	Q
3	Michaël Bultheel	Belgium	52.06	
4	Niklas Larsson	Sweden	52.67	
5	Artūras Kulnis	Lithuania	52.96	
6	Guillermo García	Spain	53.44	
7	Benjamin Chevrol	France	60.64	
	Kamil Barański	Poland	DNS	

== Participation ==
According to an unofficial count, 22 athletes from 17 countries participated in the event.

- Belgium (2)
- Croatia (1)
- Czech Republic (1)
- Denmark (1)
- Estonia (1)
- France (2)
- Greece (1)
- Hungary (1)
- Israel (1)
- Italy (1)
- Lithuania (1)
- Portugal (1)
- Spain (3)
- Sweden (1)
- Turkey (1)
- Ukraine (1)
- United Kingdom (2)
