= Quentin Iglehart-Summers =

American former track and field sprinter (born 1987)

Personal information
- Nationality: American
- Born: June 15, 1987 (age 39) San Antonio, Texas, U.S.

Sport
- Country: United States
- Sport: Athletics
- Event: 400-meter dash
- College team: Baylor Bears track and field
- Turned pro: 2009
- Retired: 2014

Achievements and titles
- Personal best: 400 m: 45.46 (2008)
Medal record
World Indoor Championships
Gold medal – first place	2012 IStanbul	4 × 400 m relay

Quentin Jarrod Iglehart-Summers (born June 15, 1987) is an American former track and field sprinter, who specialized in the 400-meter dash. He set a personal record of 45.46 seconds for the event in 2008. He was a gold medalist in the 4 × 400 metres relay at the IAAF World Indoor Championships in 2012. He also won a relay gold medal at the 2006 World Junior Championships in Athletics. At collegiate level he was a four-time national champion in the relay with the Baylor Bears.

== Career ==
Born to William Summers and Cheryle Iglehart in San Antonio, Texas, he took up track while at James Madison High School. Under coach Keith Randle, in his final year he was 400 m runner-up at the state championships and won the event at the AAU Junior Olympic Games. He gained an athletic scholarship to attend Baylor University and ran track there with their Baylor Bears track and field team. In his first year there he was runner-up at the Big 12 Conference indoor championships and anchored the team to victory in the 4 × 400 metres relay. Outdoors, he won the Big 12 and NCAA Midwest regional relay titles before helping the team to third at the 2006 NCAA Division I Outdoor Track and Field Championships in a time of 3:02.93 minutes.

Iglehart-Summers established himself as one of the top sprinters in his age group with a 400 m win at the USA Junior Outdoor Track & Field Championships. This led to his first international appearance at the 2006 World Junior Championships in Athletics in Beijing, where he was an individual semi-finalist and a gold medalist in the 4 × 400 m relay, alongside Bryshon Nellum, Chris Carter and Justin Oliver.

In his second year at Baylor he won national relay titles at the 2007 NCAA Indoor Championships and 2007 NCAA Outdoor Championships, setting a school record of 3:00.04 in the process with Reggie Witherspoon, LeJerald Betters, and Kevin Mutai. Individually, he placed third in the 400 m at the NCAA indoor meet. Regionally, he won the NCAA Midwest title and was top three at the Big 12 outdoors and indoors. Iglehart-Summers third year saw him sweep the relay titles with Baylor at NCAA, NCAA Midwest and Big 12 conference level. He was runner-up at the Big 12 outdoor meet, setting a lifetime best of 45.46 seconds. His final year with the Baylor Bears brought another NCAA Indoor relay title, and third place in the relay at the NCAA outdoors.

Iglehart-Summers ran at the 2008 United States Olympic Trials, reaching the semi-finals. He also made another international appearance at the 2008 NACAC Under-23 Championships, though the American relay team he anchored managed only fifth. He returned to national competition at the 2009 USA Outdoor Track and Field Championships, but failed to progress beyond the heats. Following appearances at the 2010 national indoor and outdoor championships, he competed sparingly in 2011 before achieving his best national placing at the 2012 USA Indoor Track and Field Championships, finishing seventh in the 400 m final. This earned him his first and only senior national selection and he came away with a gold medal from the 2012 IAAF World Indoor Championships after running in the heats only of the men's 4 × 400 metres relay. He competed in mostly Texan meets before retiring two years later, with his final national appearance coming at the 2014 USA Indoor Track and Field Championships, where he placed eighth in the 400 m.

== International competitions ==
Year	Competition	Venue	Position	Event	Notes
2006	World Junior Championships	Beijing, China	5th (semis)	400 m	47.04
2006	World Junior Championships	Beijing, China	1st	4 × 400 m relay	3:03.76
2008	NACAC U23 Championships	Toluca, Mexico	5th	4 × 400 m relay	3:18.56
2012	World Indoor Championships	Istanbul, Turkey	1st	4 × 400 m relay	3:07.47 (heats)

== National titles ==
- NCAA Outdoor
  - 4 × 400 m relay: 2007, 2008
- NCAA Indoor
  - 4 × 400 m relay: 2007, 2009

== Personal records ==
Outdoor

- 200 metres – 21.15 (2013)
- 400 metres – 45.46 (2008)
- 4 × 400 metres relay – 3:00.04 (2007)

Indoor

- 200 metres – 21.45 (2013)
- 400 metres – 46.07 (2007)
- 800 metres – 1:56.28 (2011)
- 4 × 400 metres relay – 3:04.24 (2007)
