= 2006 World Junior Championships in Athletics – Men's 400 metres hurdles =

The men's 400 metres hurdles event at the 2006 World Junior Championships in Athletics was held in Beijing, China, at Chaoyang Sports Centre on 16, 17 and 18 August.

== Medalists ==
Gold	Chris Carter; United States
Silver	Bandar Yahya Al-Sharahili; Saudi Arabia
Bronze	Stanislav Melnykov; Ukraine

== Results ==
=== Final ===
18 August

Rank	Name	Nationality	Time	Notes
1st place, gold medalist(s)	Chris Carter	United States	50.08	
2nd place, silver medalist(s)	Bandar Yahya Al-Sharahili	Saudi Arabia	50.34	
3rd place, bronze medalist(s)	Stanislav Melnykov	Ukraine	50.43	
4	Spyridon Papadópoulos	Greece	50.70	
5	Daniël Franken	Netherlands	51.08	
6	Vyacheslav Sakayev	Russia	51.13	
7	Yu Zipei	China	51.17	
8	John Kituu Wambua	Kenya	51.76	

=== Semifinals ===
17 August

==== Semifinal 1 ====
Rank	Name	Nationality	Time	Notes
1	Spyridon Papadópoulos	Greece	50.79	Q
2	Bandar Yahya Al-Sharahili	Saudi Arabia	50.83	Q
3	Stanislav Melnykov	Ukraine	50.87	q
4	Arturas Kulnis	Lithuania	51.92	
5	Marius Kranendonk	Netherlands	52.06	
6	Joe Greene	United States	53.24	
7	Andreas Bube	Denmark	53.35	
8	Yu Kyungmin	South Korea	53.74	

==== Semifinal 2 ====
Rank	Name	Nationality	Time	Notes
1	Vyacheslav Sakayev	Russia	51.30	Q
2	Daniël Franken	Netherlands	51.48	Q
3	Stephan Stoll	Germany	51.64	
4	Mohamed Daak	Saudi Arabia	51.78	
5	Andrew Yong	Australia	51.91	
6	Junya Imai	Japan	52.15	
7	Nick Kalivati	New Zealand	53.08	
	Wiekus Jonck	South Africa	DQ	

==== Semifinal 3 ====
Rank	Name	Nationality	Time	Notes
1	Chris Carter	United States	50.70	Q
2	John Kituu Wambua	Kenya	51.19	Q
3	Yu Zipei	China	51.57	q
4	Josef Prorok	Czech Republic	52.29	
5	Juan Bloem	South Africa	52.90	
6	Edoardo Guaschino	Italy	53.27	
7	Wang Ching-Chun	Chinese Taipei	53.93	
	Hans Villagrán	Guatemala	DNS	

=== Heats ===
16 August

==== Heat 1 ====
Rank	Name	Nationality	Time	Notes
1	Marius Kranendonk	Netherlands	51.40	Q
2	Yu Zipei	China	51.89	Q
3	Arturas Kulnis	Lithuania	52.18	Q
4	Andreas Bube	Denmark	52.79	Q
5	Wang Ching-Chun	Chinese Taipei	53.00	q
6	Yu Kyungmin	South Korea	53.34	q
7	David López	Puerto Rico	54.02	
	Mickaël François	France	DQ	

==== Heat 2 ====
Rank	Name	Nationality	Time	Notes
1	Chris Carter	United States	51.49	Q
2	Bandar Yahya Al-Sharahili	Saudi Arabia	51.78	Q
3	Daniël Franken	Netherlands	52.60	Q
4	Hans Villagrán	Guatemala	52.68	Q
5	Mohamed Sghaier	Tunisia	53.89	
6	Leonardo Capotosti	Italy	54.02	
7	António Rodrigues	Portugal	54.09	

==== Heat 3 ====
Rank	Name	Nationality	Time	Notes
1	Vyacheslav Sakayev	Russia	51.86	Q
2	Mohamed Daak	Saudi Arabia	52.21	Q
3	Spyridon Papadópoulos	Greece	52.28	Q
4	Joe Greene	United States	52.75	Q
5	Nick Kalivati	New Zealand	52.97	q
6	Christopher Quin	Ireland	53.45	
7	Diego Cabello	Spain	58.06	
8	Terry Marshall	Barbados	66.23	

==== Heat 4 ====
Rank	Name	Nationality	Time	Notes
1	Stephan Stoll	Germany	51.57	Q
2	Stanislav Melnykov	Ukraine	51.75	Q
3	John Kituu Wambua	Kenya	52.00	Q
4	Wiekus Jonck	South Africa	52.38	Q
5	Andrew Yong	Australia	52.42	q
6	Horatius Abrahams	Namibia	54.37	
7	Aarne Nirk	Estonia	54.46	
8	Saiful Anwar Shamsudin	Malaysia	55.88	

==== Heat 5 ====
Rank	Name	Nationality	Time	Notes
1	Juan Bloem	South Africa	52.28	Q
2	Junya Imai	Japan	52.47	Q
3	Josef Prorok	Czech Republic	52.52	Q
4	Edoardo Guaschino	Italy	53.42	Q
5	Dmitriy Korabelnikov	Kazakhstan	53.57	
6	Guillermo García	Spain	53.65	
7	Mamoudou Oumarou	Togo	53.74	
8	Wang Mupeng	China	54.94	

== Participation ==
According to an unofficial count, 39 athletes from 32 countries participated in the event.

- Australia (1)
- Barbados (1)
- China (2)
- Chinese Taipei (1)
- Czech Republic (1)
- Denmark (1)
- Estonia (1)
- France (1)
- Germany (1)
- Greece (1)
- Guatemala (1)
- Ireland (1)
- Italy (2)
- Japan (1)
- Kazakhstan (1)
- Kenya (1)
- Lithuania (1)
- Malaysia (1)
- Namibia (1)
- Netherlands (2)
- New Zealand (1)
- Portugal (1)
- Puerto Rico (1)
- Russia (1)
- Saudi Arabia (2)
- South Africa (2)
- South Korea (1)
- Spain (2)
- Togo (1)
- Tunisia (1)
- Ukraine (1)
- United States (2)
