= Tateno =

Tateno (written: 立野) is a Japanese surname. Notable people with the surname include:

- Kanako Tateno (立野 香菜子, born 1980), Japanese voice actress
- Makoto Tateno (立野 真琴), Japanese manga artist
- Noriyo Tateno (立野 記代, born 1965), Japanese professional wrestler
- Tetsuya Tateno (born 1991), Japanese hurdler

== See also ==
- Tateno Station (Kumamoto) (立野駅, Takeno-eki), train station in Minamiaso, Kumamoto Prefecture, Japan
