= Kacper Kozłowski (sprinter) =

Polish sprinter (born 1986)

Personal information
- Nationality: Polish
- Born: 7 December 1986 (age 39) Olsztyn, Poland
- Height: 1.77 m (5 ft 9 1/2 in)
- Weight: 70 kg (154 lb)

Sport
- Sport: Running
- Event: Sprints
Medal record
Men's athletics
Representing Poland
World Championships
Bronze medal – third place	2007 Osaka	4 × 400 m
European Championships
Silver medal – second place	2016 Amsterdam	4 × 400 m
Bronze medal – third place	2014 Zürich	4 × 400 m
European Indoor Championships
Gold medal – first place	2017 Belgrade	4 × 400 m
European Athletics U23 Championships
Silver medal – second place	2007 Debrecen	4 × 400 m
Bronze medal – third place	2007 Debrecen	400 m
Universiade
Silver medal – second place	2009 Belgrade	4 × 400 m

Kacper Kozłowski (Polish pronunciation: [ˈkatspɛr kɔzˈwɔfski]; born 7 December 1986) is a Polish sprint athlete who specializes in the 400 metres. He competed for Poland at the 2012 Summer Olympics in the men's 4 × 400 metres relay event.

He was also selected to represent Poland at the 2016 Summer Olympics in the men's 4 × 400 metres relay event.

== International competitions ==
Year	Competition	Venue	Position	Event	Notes
Representing Poland
2005	European Junior Championships	Kaunas, Lithuania	4th	400 m	46.87
2007	European U23 Championships	Debrecen, Hungary	3rd	400 m	45.86
2007	European U23 Championships	Debrecen, Hungary	2nd	4 × 400 m relay	3:04.76
2007	World Championships	Osaka, Japan	3rd	4 × 400 m relay	3:00.05
2009	Universiade	Belgrade, Serbia	4th	400 m	46.27
2009	Universiade	Belgrade, Serbia	2nd	4 × 400 m relay	3:05.69
2009	World Championships	Berlin, Germany	5th	4 × 400 m relay	3:02.23
2010	European Championships	Barcelona, Spain	8th	400 m	46.07
2010	European Championships	Barcelona, Spain	5th	4 × 400 m relay	3:03.42
2011	World Championships	Daegu, South Korea	11th (h)	4 × 400 m relay	3:01.84
2012	European Championships	Helsinki, Finland	13th (sf)	400 m	46.54
2012	European Championships	Helsinki, Finland	4th	4 × 400 m relay	3:02.37
2012	Olympic Games	London, UK	9th (h)	4 × 400 m relay	3:02.86
2013	World Championships	Moscow, Russia	7th (h)	4 × 400 m relay	3:01.73
2014	World Indoor Championships	Sopot, Poland	4th	4 × 400 m relay	3:04.39
2014	IAAF World Relays	Nassau, Bahamas	19th (h)	4 × 400 m relay	3:05.16
2014	European Championships	Zürich, Switzerland	3rd	4 × 400 m relay	2:59.85
2015	IAAF World Relays	Nassau, Bahamas	9th	4 × 400 m relay	3:03.23
2016	European Championships	Amsterdam, Netherlands	2nd	4 × 400 m relay	3:01.18
2017	European Indoor Championships	Belgrade, Serbia	1st	4 × 400 m relay	3:06.99
2017	IAAF World Relays	Nassau, Bahamas	3rd (B)	4 × 400 m relay	3:07.89
