= Puerto Rico at the 2011 World Championships in Athletics =

- WA code: PUR
- National federation: Federación de Atletismo de Puerto Rico
- Website: www.atletismofapur.com

in Daegu
- Competitors: 8
- Medals: Gold 0 Silver 1 Bronze 0 Total 1

World Championships in Athletics appearances
- 1983; 1987; 1991; 1993; 1995; 1997; 1999; 2001; 2003; 2005; 2007; 2009; 2011; 2013; 2015; 2017; 2019; 2022; 2023; 2025

Puerto Rico competed at the 2011 World Championships in Athletics from August 27 to September 4 in Daegu, South Korea.

== Team selection ==
A team of 8 athletes was announced to represent the country in the event. The team is led by last event's silver medalist, 400m hurdler Javier Culson.

The following athlete appeared on the preliminary Entry List, but not on the Official Start List of the specific event:

| KEY: | Did not participate | Competed in another event |

| | Event | Athlete |
|---|---|---|
| Men | 4 x 100 metres relay | Héctor Cotto |

== Medalists ==
The following competitor from Puerto Rico won a medal at the Championships

| Medal | Athlete | Event |
|---|---|---|
| Silver | Javier Culson | 400 m hurdles |

== Results ==
=== Men ===
| Athlete | Event | Preliminaries | | Heats | | Semifinals | | Final | |
| Athlete | Event | Time Width Height | Rank | Time Width Height | Rank | Time Width Height | Rank | Time Width Height | Rank |
|---|---|---|---|---|---|---|---|---|---|
| Héctor Cotto | 110 m hurdles | | | 13.60 | 20 | Did not advance | | | |
| Javier Culson | 400 m hurdles | | | 48.95 | 9 | 48.52 | 1 | 48.44 | 2nd place, silver medalist(s) |
| Jamele Mason | 400 m hurdles | | | 49.98 | 25 | Did not advance | | | |
| Marcos Amalbert; Carlos Rodríguez; Sean Holston; Miguel López | 4 x 100 metres relay | | | 39.04 NR | 14 | | | Did not advance | |

=== Women ===
| Athlete | Event | Preliminaries | | Heats | | Semifinals | | Final | |
| Athlete | Event | Time Width Height | Rank | Time Width Height | Rank | Time Width Height | Rank | Time Width Height | Rank |
|---|---|---|---|---|---|---|---|---|---|
| Beverly Ramos | 3000 metres steeplechase | | | 9:45.50 | 17 | | | Did not advance | |
