= Michaël Bultheel =

Belgian hurdler

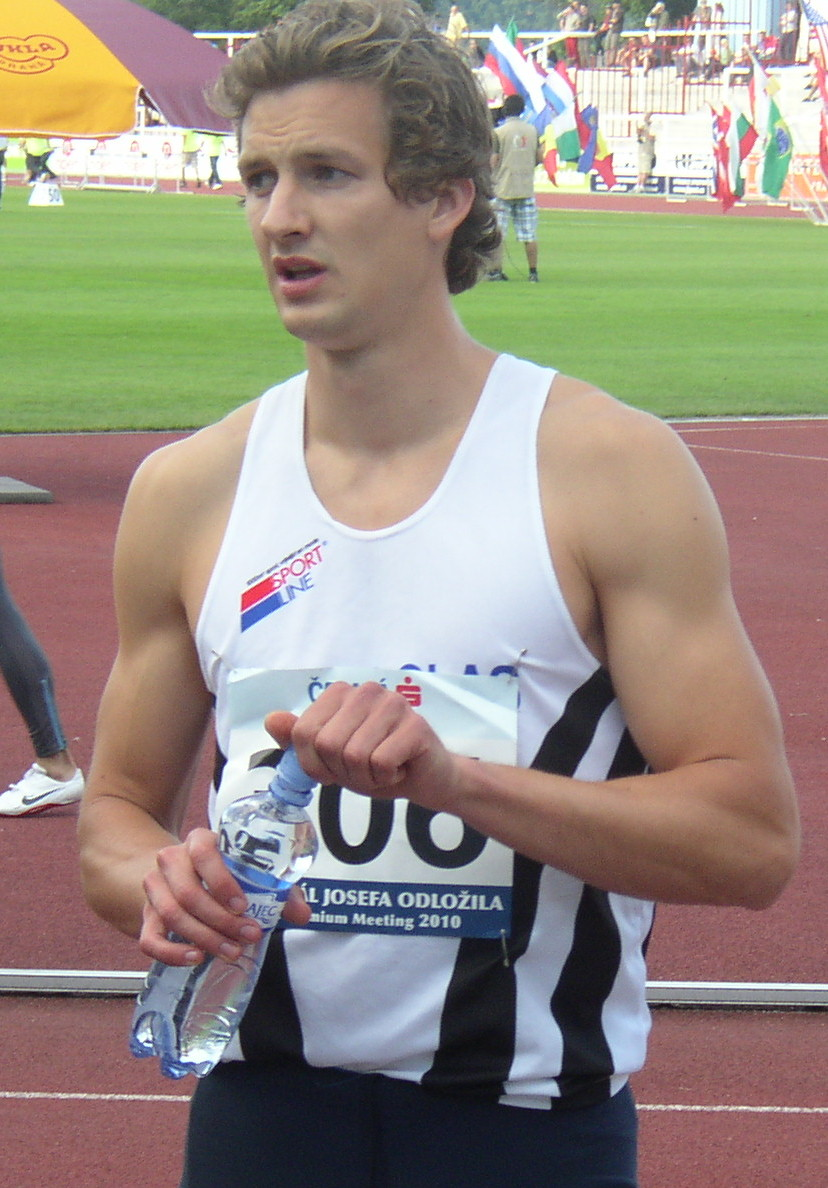
- Michaël Bultheel in 2010

Personal information
- Born: June 30, 1986 (age 39) Ypres, Belgium
- Education: Katholieke Universiteit Leuven
- Height: 1.89 m (6 ft 2 1/2 in)
- Weight: 81 kg (179 lb)

Sport
- Country: Belgium
- Sport: Athletics
- Event: 400 metres hurdles
- Club: Flanders Atletiek Club
- Coached by: Carlos Baillieu; Rudi Diels

Michaël Bultheel (born 30 June 1986 in Ypres) is a retired Belgian athlete, who specialised in the 400 metres hurdles. At the 2012 Summer Olympics, he competed in the men's 400 metres hurdles, making it to the semifinals, and ran anchor leg for Belgium in the 4 × 400 m relay finals, placing sixth. He set a then-personal best at London 2012 of 49.10, which he improved in 2015 to 49.04.

== Competition record ==
Year	Competition	Venue	Position	Event	Notes
Representing Belgium
2004	World Junior Championships	Grosseto, Italy	14th (sf)	400 m hurdles	52.21
2007	European U23 Championships	Debrecen, Hungary	14th (h)	400 m hurdles	52.06
2009	Universiade	Belgrade, Serbia	3rd	400 m hurdles	49.79
2009	World Championships	Berlin, Germany	19th (h)	400 m hurdles	49.67
2010	European Championships	Barcelona, Spain	11th (sf)	400 m hurdles	50.60
2011	Universiade	Shenzhen, China	8th	400 m hurdles	54.39
2012	European Championships	Helsinki, Finland	10th (sf)	400 m hurdles	49.98
2012	Olympic Games	London, United Kingdom	11th (sf)	400 m hurdles	49.10
2012	Olympic Games	London, United Kingdom	6th	4 × 400 m relay	3:01.83
2014	European Championships	Zürich, Switzerland	12th (sf)	400 m hurdles	49.62
2014	European Championships	Zürich, Switzerland	7th	4 × 400 m relay	3:02.60
2015	World Championships	Beijing, China	22nd (sf)	400 m hurdles	49.66
2016	European Championships	Amsterdam, Netherlands	15th (sf)	400 m hurdles	49.72
2016	Olympic Games	Rio de Janeiro, Brazil	18th (sf)	400 m hurdles	49.46
