= João Ferreira (hurdler) =

Portuguese athlete

Personal information
- Born: 20 October 1986 (age 39) Lisbon, Portugal

Sport
- Sport: Athletics
- Event: 400 m hurdles
- Club: Sporting C.P
Medal record
Lusophony Games
Gold medal – first place	2009 Lusophony Games	400 m

João Pedro Ferreira (born 20 October 1986) is a Portuguese former athlete who competed primarily in the 400 metres hurdles. He represented his country in the 4 × 100 metres relay at the 2011 World Championships without qualifying for the final.

== International competitions ==
Year	Competition	Venue	Position	Event	Notes
Representing Portugal
2005	European Junior Championships	Kaunas, Lithuania	5th	110 m hurdles (106.7 cm)	14.57
2005	European Junior Championships	Kaunas, Lithuania	14th (h)	4 × 400 m relay	3:15.92
2007	European U23 Championships	Erfurt, Germany	13th (h)	110 m hurdles	15.02
2009	Lusophony Games	Lisbon, Portugal	2nd	400 m	47.00
2009	Lusophony Games	Lisbon, Portugal	2nd	4 × 400 m relay	3:13.10
2010	Ibero-American Championships	San Fernando, Spain	17th (h)	400 m	48.35
2010	Ibero-American Championships	San Fernando, Spain	–	4 × 400 m relay	DNF
2010	European Championships	Barcelona, Spain	22nd (h)	400 m hurdles	52.27
2010	European Championships	Barcelona, Spain	6th	4 × 100 m relay	38.88
2011	Universiade	Shenzhen, China	4th	400 m hurdles	49.63
2011	World Championships	Daegu, South Korea	14th (h)	4 × 100 m relay	39.09
2012	European Championships	Helsinki, Finland	–	400 m hurdles	DNF

== Personal bests ==
Outdoor

- 100 metres – 10.70 (0.0 m/s, Leiria 2009)
- 200 metres – 21.03 (+0.7 m/s, Lisbon 2008)
- 400 metres – 46.66 (Leiria 2009)
- 110 metres hurdles – 13.97 (+1.1 m/s, Budapest 2010)
- 400 metres hurdles – 49.63 (Shenzhen 2011)

Indoor

- 60 metres – 6.95 (Espinho 2007)
- 200 metres – 21.55 (Pombal 2010)
- 400 metres – 48.00 (Pombal 2011)
- 60 metres hurdles – 7.98 (Espinho 2006)
