= 2012 IAAF World Indoor Championships – Men's 4 × 400 metres relay =

The men's 4 × 400 metres relay at the 2012 IAAF World Indoor Championships will be held at the Ataköy Athletics Arena on 10 and 11 March.

== Medalists ==
Gold	Silver	Bronze
United States; Frankie Wright; Calvin Smith Jr. Manteo Mitchell; Gil Roberts; Jamaal Torrance*; Quentin Iglehart-Summers*	Great Britain; Conrad Williams; Nigel Levine; Michael Bingham; Richard Buck; Luke Lennon-Ford*	Trinidad and Tobago; Lalonde Gordon; Renny Quow; Jereem Richards; Jarrin Solomon

* Runners who participated only in the heats and received medals.

== Records ==
Standing records prior to the 2012 IAAF World Indoor Championships
World record	United States (USA)	3:02.83	Maebashi, Japan	7 March 1999
Championship record	United States (USA)	3:02.83	Maebashi, Japan	7 March 1999
World Leading	University of Arkansas	3:03.76	Fayetteville, United States	11 February 2012
African record	Nigeria (NGR)	3:09.76	Lisbon, Portugal	10 March 2001
Asian record	Japan (JPN)	3:05.90	Maebashi, Japan	6 March 1999
European record	Poland (POL)	3:03.01	Maebashi, Japan	7 March 1999
North and Central American and Caribbean record	United States (USA)	3:02.83	Maebashi, Japan	7 March 1999
Oceanian Record	Australia (AUS)	3:08.49	Seville, Spain	10 March 1991
South American record	Brazil (BRA)	3:10.50	Paris, France	8 March 1997

== Schedule ==
Date	Time	Round
March 10, 2012	11:20	Heats
March 11, 2012	17:40	Final

== Results ==
=== Heats ===
Qualification: First 2 of each heat (Q) plus the 2 fastest times (q) advance to the final.

11 teams from 11 countries participated. One country did not start the competition. With two heats competing, the qualification round started at 11:20 and 11:33.

Rank	Heat	Nation	Athletes	Time	Notes
1	2	Great Britain	Conrad Williams, Luke Lennon-Ford, Michael Bingham, Richard Buck	3:07.45	Q, SB
2	1	United States	Frankie Wright, Jamaal Torrance, Manteo Mitchell, Quentin Iglehart-Summers	3:07.47	Q, SB
3	2	Poland	Jakub Krzewina, Marcin Marciniszyn, Grzegorz Sobiński, Łukasz Krawczuk	3:07.99	Q, SB
4	2	Trinidad and Tobago	Lalonde Gordon, Renny Quow, Jereem Richards, Jarrin Solomon	3:08.32	q, SB
5	2	Russia	Sergey Petukhov, Valentin Kruglyakov, Semen Golubev, Vladislav Frolov	3:08.43	q, SB
6	2	Ukraine	Myhaylo Knysh, Volodymyr Burakov, Dmytro Bikulov, Yevhen Hutsol	3:08.92	NR
7	2	Czech Republic	Josef Prorok, Petr Lichý, Vaclav Barak, Theodor Jareš	3:09.46	SB
8	1	Spain	Mark Ujakpor, David Testa, Samuel García, Xavier Carrión	3:10.51	Q, SB
9	1	Venezuela	José Acevedo, Omar Longart, Alberto Aguilar, Freddy Mezones	3:11.11	NR
10	1	Turkey	Ali Ekber Kayaş, Halit Kiliç, Mehmet Güzel, Yavuz Can	3:11.28	NR
11	1	Botswana	Thapelo Ketlogetswe, Isaac Makwala, Pako Seribe, Zacharia Kamberuka	3:13.21	NR
	1	Bahamas	Michael Mathieu, La'Sean Pickstock, Jameson Strachan, Demetrius Pinder	DNS	

=== Final ===
Started at 17:40.

Rank	Nation	Athletes	Time	Notes
1st place, gold medalist(s)	United States	Frankie Wright, Calvin Smith Jr., Manteo Mitchell, Gil Roberts	3:03.94	SB
2nd place, silver medalist(s)	Great Britain	Conrad Williams, Nigel Levine, Michael Bingham, Richard Buck	3:04.72	SB
3rd place, bronze medalist(s)	Trinidad and Tobago	Lalonde Gordon, Renny Quow, Jereem Richards, Jarrin Solomon	3:06.85	NR
4	Russia	Sergey Petukhov, Valentin Kruglyakov, Semen Golubev, Vladislav Frolov	3:07.35	SB
5	Spain	Mark Ujakpor, David Testa, Samuel García, Xavier Carrión	3:10.01	SB
6	Poland	Jakub Krzewina, Marcin Marciniszyn, Grzegorz Sobiński, Łukasz Krawczuk	3:11.86	
