= Nils Duerinck =

Belgian sprinter and hurdler (born 1984)

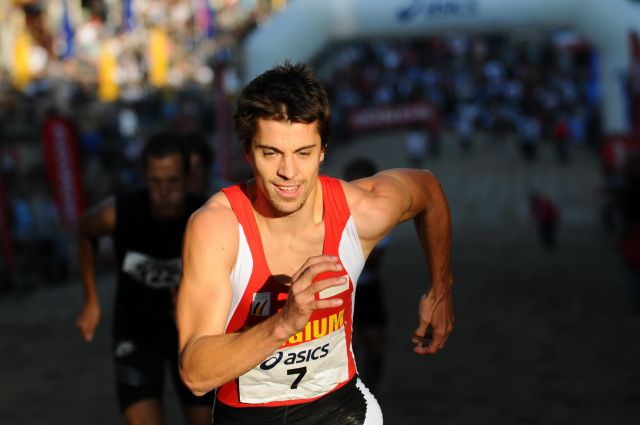

Personal information
- Born: 20 March 1984 (age 42)
- Height: 1.83 m (6 ft 0 in)
- Weight: 75 kg (165 lb)

Sport
- Country: Belgium
- Sport: Athletics
- Event: 4 × 400m Relay

Nils Duerinck (born 20 March 1984) is a retired Belgian sprint athlete who specialized in the 400 meters hurdles.

== Achievements ==
Year	Competition	Venue	Position	Event	Notes
Representing Belgium
Year	Competition	Venue	Position	Event	Notes
2005	European U23 Championships	Erfurt, Germany	16th (h)	400 m	47.09
2005	Universiade	İzmir, Turkey	9th (sf)	400 m	46.79
2009	Universiade	Belgrade, Serbia	14th (sf)	400 m	47.24
2009	Universiade	Belgrade, Serbia	4th	4 × 400 m relay	3:06.61
2009	World Championships	Berlin, Germany	4th	4 × 400 m relay	3:01.88
2010	World Indoor Championships	Doha, Qatar	2nd	4 × 400 m relay	3:08.84 (h)
2010	European Championships	Barcelona, Spain	9th (sf)	400 m hurdles	50.46
2010	European Championships	Barcelona, Spain	3rd	4 × 400 m relay	3:03.49 (h)
2011	European Indoor Championships	Paris, France	3rd	4 × 400 m relay	3:06.57
2011	Universiade	Shenzhen, China	11th (sf)	400 m hurdles	50.80
2011	World Championships	Daegu, South Korea	5th	4 × 400 m relay	3:00.41
2012	European Championships	Helsinki, Finland	1st (h)	4 × 400 m relay	3:05.29
2012	Olympic Games	London, United Kingdom	6th (h)	4 × 400 m relay	3:01.70
