= Brent LaRue =

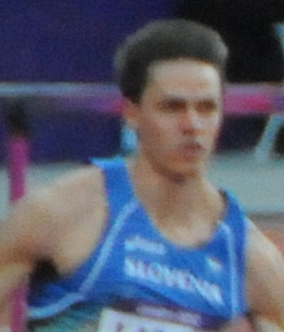
- LaRue in 2012

Personal information
- Nationality: American/Slovenian
- Born: April 26, 1987 (age 39) Arlington Heights, Illinois, U.S.
- Home town: Kernersville, North Carolina, U.S.
- Education: Wake Forest University
- Height: 193 cm (76 in)
- Weight: 187 lb (85 kg)
- Website: www.brentlarue.me

Sport
- Country: Slovenia
- Sport: Track and field
- Event: 400 meters hurdles
- University team: Wake Forest Demon Deacons
- Club: AD MASS Ljubljana
- Coached by: Albert Šoba

Achievements and titles
- Personal bests: 400 m hurdles: 49.38 (2012); 400 m: 45.75 (2011)

Brent LaRue (born April 26, 1987) is an American-born Slovenian athlete from Kernersville, North Carolina. An alumnus of Wake Forest University, he represented Slovenia in the men's 400 meters hurdles at the 2012 Summer Olympics.

== Personal life ==
LaRue attended East Forsyth High School in Kernersville, North Carolina where he was a track standout. He went on to attend Wake Forest University. LaRue's track career at Wake Forest included being a 2-time NCAA All-American and 4-time ACC Champion.

While at Wake Forest, LaRue met Ana Jerman, a Wake Forest tennis player originally from Slovenia. They moved to Slovenia, where they got married in 2010. In July 2011 LaRue received Slovenian citizenship. He holds a master's degree in international business. He currently works in the tech industry and is a co-founder of the telehealth app Circle Medical. He currently lives in Switzerland with his wife and daughter.
