= 2010 European Athletics Championships – Men's 400 metres hurdles =

Men's 400 metres hurdles at the European Athletics Championships

The men's 400 metres hurdles at the 2010 European Athletics Championships was held at the Estadi Olímpic Lluís Companys on 28, 29 and 31 July.

== Medalists ==
Gold	(United Kingdom) Dai Greene; Great Britain (GBR)
Silver	(United Kingdom) Rhys Williams; Great Britain (GBR)
Bronze	Stanislav Melnykov; Ukraine (UKR)

== Records ==
Standing records prior to the 2010 European Athletics Championships
World record	Kevin Young (USA)	46.78	Barcelona, Spain	6 August 1992
European record	Stéphane Diagana (FRA)	47.37	Lausanne, Switzerland	5 July 1995
Championship record	Harald Schmid (FRG)	47.48	Athens, Greece	8 September 1982
World Leading	Bershawn Jackson (USA)	47.32	Des Moines, IA, United States	26 June 2010
European Leading	Dai Greene (GBR)	48.49	Lausanne, Switzerland	8 July 2010
Broken records during the 2010 European Athletics Championships
European Leading	Dai Greene (GBR)	48.12	Barcelona, Spain	31 July 2010

== Schedule ==
Date	Time	Round
28 July 2010	12:50	Round 1
29 July 2010	19:30	Semifinals
31 July 2010	20:10	Final

== Results ==
=== Round 1 ===
First 3 in each heat (Q) and 4 best performers (q) advance to the Semifinals.

==== Heat 1 ====
Rank	Lane	Name	Nationality	React	Time	Notes
1	4	Aleksandr Derevyagin	Russia	0.186	50.14	Q
2	6	Fadil Bellaabouss	France	0.193	50.32	Q
3	8	Nathan Woodward	Great Britain & N.I.	0.187	50.45	Q
4	3	Michal Uhlík	Czech Republic	0.188	50.47	q
5	5	Ignacio Sarmiento	Spain	0.171	51.82	
6	2	Silvestras Guogis	Lithuania	0.178	53.38	
–	7	Sotírios Iakovákis	Greece	0.238		DSQ

==== Heat 2 ====
Rank	Lane	Name	Nationality	React	Time	Notes
1	5	Rhys Williams	Great Britain & N.I.	0.208	49.35	Q
2	4	Periklis Iakovakis	Greece	0.204	49.49	Q, SB
3	3	Josef Prorok	Czech Republic	0.272	49.97	Q, PB
4	7	Attila Nagy	Romania	0.275	50.31	q, PB
5	6	Stef Vanhaeren	Belgium	0.190	50.71	q, PB
6	2	Tuncay Örs	Turkey	0.314	51.41	
–	8	Andreas Totsås	Norway	0.211		DSQ

==== Heat 3 ====
Rank	Lane	Name	Nationality	React	Time	Notes
1	6	Stanislav Melnykov	Ukraine	0.260	50.32	Q
2	3	Héni Kechi	France	0.259	50.50	Q
3	2	Nils Duerinck	Belgium	0.262	50.89	Q
4	5	Spirídon Papadópoulos	Greece	0.235	51.25	
5	4	Diego Cabello	Spain	0.175	51.48	
6	7	João Ferreira	Portugal	0.184	52.27	
7	8	Aarne Nirk	Estonia	0.229	52.75	
8	1	Björgvin Vikingsson	Iceland	0.158	54.46	

==== Heat 4 ====
Rank	Lane	Name	Nationality	React	Time	Notes
1	4	Dai Greene	Great Britain & N.I.	0.189	50.11	Q
2	5	Michaël Bultheel	Belgium	0.232	50.48	Q
3	2	Sébastien Maillard	France	0.219	50.73	Q
4	6	Giacomo Panizza	Italy	0.374	51.11	q
5	8	Fausto Santini	Switzerland	0.207	51.43	
6	3	Jussi Heikkilä	Finland	0.211	52.46	
7	7	Rafał Omelko	Poland	0.196	52.54	

==== Summary ====
Rank	Heat	Lane	Name	Nationality	React	Time	Notes
1	2	5	Rhys Williams	Great Britain & N.I.		49.35	Q
2	2	4	Periklis Iakovakis	Greece		49.49	Q, SB
3	2	3	Josef Prorok	Czech Republic		49.97	Q, PB
4	4	4	Dai Greene	Great Britain & N.I.		50.11	Q
5	1	4	Aleksandr Derevyagin	Russia		50.14	Q
6	2	7	Attila Nagy	Romania		50.31	q, PB
7	1	6	Fadil Bellaabouss	France		50.32	Q
7	3	6	Stanislav Melnykov	Ukraine		50.32	Q
9	1	8	Nathan Woodward	Great Britain & N.I.		50.45	Q
10	1	3	Michal Uhlík	Czech Republic		50.47	q
11	4	5	Michaël Bultheel	Belgium		50.48	Q
12	3	3	Héni Kechi	France		50.50	Q
13	2	6	Stef Vanhaeren	Belgium		50.71	q, PB
14	4	2	Sébastien Maillard	France		50.73	Q
15	3	2	Nils Duerinck	Belgium		50.89	Q
16	4	6	Giacomo Panizza	Italy		51.11	q
17	3	5	Spirídon Papadópoulos	Greece		51.25	
18	2	2	Tuncay Örs	Turkey		51.41	
19	4	8	Fausto Santini	Switzerland		51.43	
20	3	4	Diego Cabello	Spain		51.48	
21	1	5	Ignacio Sarmiento	Spain		51.82	
22	3	7	João Ferreira	Portugal		52.27	
23	4	3	Jussi Heikkilä	Finland		52.46	
24	4	7	Rafał Omelko	Poland		52.54	
25	3	8	Aarne Nirk	Estonia		52.75	
26	1	2	Silvestras Guogis	Lithuania		53.38	
27	3	1	Björgvin Vikingsson	Iceland		54.46	
	1	7	Sotírios Iakovákis	Greece			DSQ
	2	8	Andreas Totsås	Norway			DSQ

=== Semifinals ===
First 3 in each heat and 2 best performers advance to the Final.

==== Semifinal 1 ====
Rank	Lane	Name	Nationality	Time	Notes
1	3	Dai Greene	Great Britain & N.I.	49.48	Q
2	5	Aleksandr Derevyagin	Russia	49.85	Q, SB
3	6	Fadil Bellaabouss	France	50.09	Q
4	7	Nathan Woodward	Great Britain & N.I.	50.51	
5	4	Michaël Bultheel	Belgium	50.60	
6	2	Stef Vanhaeren	Belgium	50.86	
7	1	Michal Uhlík	Czech Republic	51.06	
8	8	Sébastien Maillard	France	51.26	

==== Semifinal 2 ====
Rank	Lane	Name	Nationality	Time	Notes
1	4	Rhys Williams	Great Britain & N.I.	49.61	Q
2	6	Stanislav Melnykov	Ukraine	49.76	Q
3	3	Héni Kechi	France	50.05	Q
4	7	Josef Prorok	Czech Republic	50.13	q
5	5	Periklis Iakovakis	Greece	50.33	q
6	8	Nils Duerinck	Belgium	50.46	
7	1	Giacomo Panizza	Italy	51.46	
8	2	Attila Nagy	Romania	51.98	

==== Summary ====
Rank	Semifinal	Lane	Name	Nationality	Time	Notes
1	1	3	Dai Greene	Great Britain & N.I.	49.48	Q
2	2	4	Rhys Williams	Great Britain & N.I.	49.61	Q
3	2	6	Stanislav Melnykov	Ukraine	49.76	Q
4	1	5	Aleksandr Derevyagin	Russia	49.85	Q, SB
5	2	3	Héni Kechi	France	50.05	Q
6	1	6	Fadil Bellaabouss	France	50.09	Q
7	2	7	Josef Prorok	Czech Republic	50.13	q
8	2	5	Periklis Iakovakis	Greece	50.33	q
9	2	8	Nils Duerinck	Belgium	50.46	
10	1	7	Nathan Woodward	Great Britain & N.I.	50.51	
11	1	4	Michaël Bultheel	Belgium	50.60	
12	1	2	Stef Vanhaeren	Belgium	50.86	
13	1	1	Michal Uhlík	Czech Republic	51.06	
14	1	8	Sébastien Maillard	France	51.26	
15	2	1	Giacomo Panizza	Italy	51.46	
16	2	2	Attila Nagy	Romania	51.98	

=== Final ===
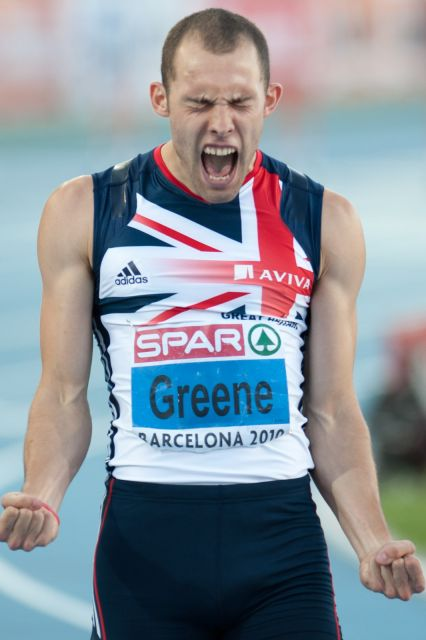
Dai Greene celebrating his first major championship win.

Rank	Lane	Name	Nationality	React	Time	Notes
1st place, gold medalist(s)	3	Dai Greene	Great Britain & N.I.	0.175	48.12	EL
2nd place, silver medalist(s)	5	Rhys Williams	Great Britain & N.I.	0.195	48.96	PB
3rd place, bronze medalist(s)	6	Stanislav Melnykov	Ukraine	0.314	49.09	PB
4	7	Héni Kechi	France	0.186	49.34	PB
5	1	Periklis Iakovakis	Greece	0.225	49.38	SB
6	2	Josef Prorok	Czech Republic	0.217	49.68	PB
7	4	Aleksandr Derevyagin	Russia	0.200	49.70	SB
8	8	Fadil Bellaabouss	France	0.180	1:02.94	
