= Teddy Atine-Venel =

French sprinter

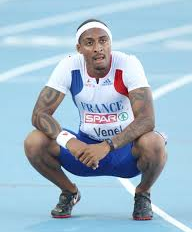
- Teddy Venel in 2010

Personal information
- Born: 16 March 1985 (age 41) Orsay, France
- Height: 1.84 m (6 ft 0 in)
- Weight: 85 kg (187 lb)

Sport
- Country: France
- Sport: Athletics
- Event: 400 metres
- Club: Lagardère Paris Racing
- Coached by: Guy Ontanon

Teddy Atine-Venel (born 16 March 1985 in Orsay, France) is a French athlete who specialises in the 400 meters. He represented his country at the 2008 Summer Olympics as well as three outdoor and one indoor World Championships.

His personal bests in the event are 45.39 seconds outdoors (Forbach 2017) and 47.38 seconds indoors (Aubière 2006).

== International competitions ==
Year	Competition	Venue	Position	Event	Notes
Representing France
2003	European Junior Championships	Tampere, Finland	5th	4 × 400 m relay	3:11.82
2004	World Junior Championships	Berlin, Germany	24th (h)	400 m	47.73
2004	World Junior Championships	Berlin, Germany	15th (h)	4 × 400 m relay	3:12.80
2006	World Indoor Championships	Moscow, Russia	6th	4 × 400 m relay	3:09.55
2007	European U23 Championships	Debrecen, Hungary	11th (sf)	400 m	47.14
2007	European U23 Championships	Debrecen, Hungary	–	4 × 400 m relay	DQ
2008	Olympic Games	Beijing, China	11th (h)	4 × 400 m relay	3:03.19
2009	Mediterranean Games	Pescara, Italy	2nd	400 m	46.04
2009	World Championships	Berlin, Germany	21st (sf)	400 m	46.30
2009	World Championships	Berlin, Germany	7th	4 × 400 m relay	3:02.65
2010	European Championships	Barcelona, Spain	9th (sf)	400 m	45.55
2010	European Championships	Barcelona, Spain	6th	4 × 400 m relay	3:03.85
2011	World Championships	Daegu, South Korea	14th (h)	4 × 400 m relay	3:03.68
2012	European Championships	Helsinki, Finland	–	400 m	DQ
2012	European Championships	Helsinki, Finland	6th	4 × 400 m relay	3:03.04
2014	IAAF World Relays	Nassau, Bahamas	10th (h)	4 × 400 m relay	3:03.74
2014	European Championships	Zürich, Switzerland	3rd	4 × 400 m relay	2:59.89
2015	IAAF World Relays	Nassau, Bahamas	10th (h)	4 × 400 m relay	3:03.88
2015	World Championships	Beijing, China	6th	4 × 400 m relay	3:00.65
2016	Olympic Games	Rio de Janeiro, Brazil	9th (h)	4 × 400 m relay	3:00.82
2017	IAAF World Relays	Nassau, Bahamas	8th	4 × 400 m relay	3:06.33
2017	World Championships	London, United Kingdom	30th (h)	400 m	45.90
2017	World Championships	London, United Kingdom	8th	4 × 400 m relay	3:01.79
2018	Mediterranean Games	Tarragona, Spain	10th (h)	400 m	48.12
2018	European Championships	Berlin, Germany	4th	4 × 400 m relay	3:02.08
