= Stanislav Melnykov =

Ukrainian hurdler (born 1987)

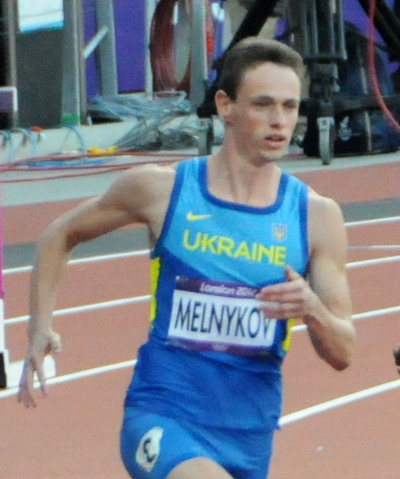

Personal information
- Born: 26 February 1987 (age 39)
- Height: 1.83 m (6 ft 0 in)
- Weight: 72 kg (159 lb)

Sport
- Country: Ukraine
- Sport: Athletics
- Event: 400m Hurdles
Medal record
European Championships
Bronze medal – third place	2010 Barcelona	400 metres hurdles
Bronze medal – third place	2012 Helsinki	400 metres hurdles
European Team Championships
Bronze medal – third place	2010 Bergen	4x400 metres relay

Stanislav Melnykov (Ukrainian: Станіслав Мельников; born 26 February 1987 in Odessa) is a Ukrainian 400 metres hurdler and many times national champion.

== Competition record ==
Year	Competition	Venue	Position	Event	Notes
Representing Ukraine
2005	European Junior Championships	Kaunas, Lithuania	23rd (h)	400 m hurdles	53.74
2006	World Junior Championships	Beijing, China	3rd	400 m hurdles	50.43
2007	European U23 Championships	Debrecen, Hungary	8th	400 m hurdles	51.53
2009	European Indoor Championships	Turin, Italy	12th (h)	400 m	47.24
2009	European U23 Championships	Kaunas, Lithuania	2nd	400 m hurdles	49.88
2009	World Championships	Berlin, Germany	23rd (h)	400 m hurdles	50.41
2010	European Championships	Barcelona, Spain	3rd	400 m hurdles	49.09
2011	World Championships	Daegu, South Korea	18th (sf)	400 m hurdles	49.74
2012	European Championships	Helsinki, Finland	3rd	400 m hurdles	49.69
2012	European Championships	Helsinki, Finland	7th	4 × 400 m relay	3:04.56
2012	Olympic Games	London, United Kingdom	19th (sf)	400 m hurdles	50.19
2014	European Championships	Zürich, Switzerland	19th (sf)	400 m hurdles	50.60
2016	European Championships	Amsterdam, Netherlands	23rd (sf)	400 m hurdles	51.06
