= Mickaël François =

French hurdler

Personal information
- Born: 12 March 1988 (age 37) Montfermeil, France

Sport
- Sport: Athletics
- Event: 400 metres hurdles
- Club: A.C. Paris Joinville
- Coached by: François Pépin

Mickaël François (born 12 March 1988 in Montfermeil) is a French athlete specialising in the 400 metres hurdles. He represented his country at the 2013 World Championships reaching the semifinals.

His personal best in the event is 49.35 seconds set in Ninove in 2013.

== International competitions ==
Year	Competition	Venue	Position	Event	Notes
Representing France
2006	World Junior Championships	Beijing, China	–	400 m hurdles	DQ
2006	World Junior Championships	Beijing, China	8th (h)	4 × 400 m relay	3:07.76
2007	European Junior Championships	Hengelo, Netherlands	4th	400 m hurdles	51.06
2007	European Junior Championships	Hengelo, Netherlands	3rd	4 × 400 m relay	3:09.10
2009	European U23 Championships	Kaunas, Lithuania	6th	400 m hurdles	50.25
2013	World Championships	Moscow, Russia	22nd (sf)	400 m hurdles	50.58
2013	Jeux de la Francophonie	Nice, France	4th	400 m hurdles	51.60
2017	Jeux de la Francophonie	Abidjan, Ivory Coast	4th	400 m hurdles	51.03
2017	Jeux de la Francophonie	Abidjan, Ivory Coast	3rd	4 × 400 m relay	3:12.23

== Personal bests ==
Outdoor

- 400 metres – 47.17 (Albi 2013)
- 400 metres hurdles – 49.35 (Ninove 2013)

Indoor

- 400 metres – 47.55 (Eaubonne 2008)
