= Ignacio Sarmiento =

Spanish hurdler (born 1986)

Ignacio Sarmiento (born 28 December 1986) is a Spanish hurdler.

He competed at the 2007 European Athletics Championships and the 2010 European Championships without reaching the final.

He became Spanish champion in the event in 2009, and his personal best time is 50.63 seconds, achieved in July 2014 in Alcobendas.
