= Aarne Nirk =

Estonian hurdler

Personal information
- Full name: Aarne Nirk
- Born: 8 May 1987 (age 39) Tartu, then part of Estonian SSR, Soviet Union

Aarne Nirk (born 8 May 1987 in Tartu) is an Estonian hurdler.

== Achievements ==
Year	Competition	Venue	Position	Event	Notes
Representing Estonia
2006	World Junior Championships	Beijing, China	34th (h)	400m hurdles	54.46
2007	European U23 Championships	Debrecen, Hungary	8th (h)	400m hurdles	51.26
2009	Universiade	Belgrade, Serbia	11th (sf)	400 m hurdles	52.63
2009	European U23 Championships	Kaunas, Lithuania	13th (sf)	400m hurdles	51.57
2009	European U23 Championships	Kaunas, Lithuania	8th	4 × 400 m relay	3:12.30
2010	European Championships	Barcelona, Spain	25th (h)	400 m hurdles	52.75
2011	Universiade	Shenzhen, China	29th (h)	400 m hurdles	52.93
