= Josef Prorok =

Czech track and field athlete (born 1987)

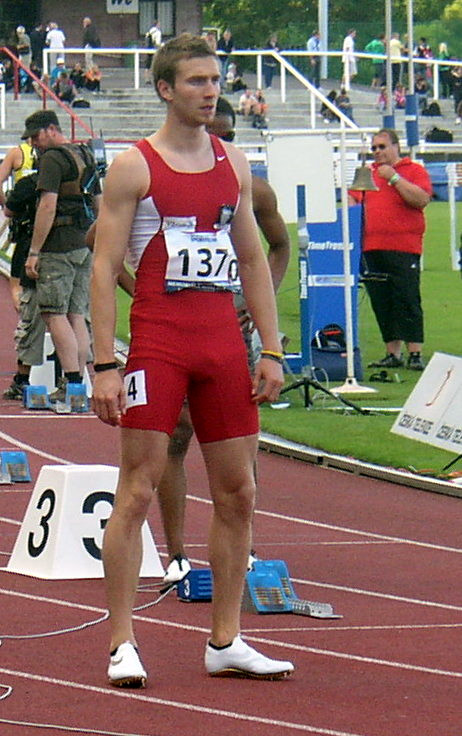
- Prorok in 2010

Personal information
- Born: 16 November 1987 (age 38) Prague, Czech Republic
- Height: 1.90 m (6 ft 3 in)
- Weight: 81 kg (179 lb)

Sport
- Country: Czech Republic
- Sport: Athletics
- Event: 400m Hurdles
Medal record
European Indoor Championships
Bronze medal – third place	2013 Gothenburg	4 x 400 m relay

Josef Prorok (Czech pronunciation: [ˈjozɛf ˈprorok]; born 16 November 1987) is a Czech track and field athlete who specialises in the 400 metres hurdles. He participated in his first Olympic Games in London in 2012.

== Achievements ==
Year	Competition	Venue	Position	Event	Notes
Representing the Czech Republic
2006	World Junior Championships	Beijing, China	15th (sf)	400m hurdles	52.29
2006	World Junior Championships	Beijing, China	12th (h)	4 × 400 m relay	3:08.69
2007	European U23 Championships	Debrecen, Hungary	7th (h)	400m hurdles	51.16
2009	European U23 Championships	Kaunas, Lithuania	8th	400m hurdles	51.02
2010	World Indoor Championships	Doha, Qatar	7th (h)	4 × 400 m relay	3:09.76
2010	European Championships	Barcelona, Spain	6th	400 m hurdles	49.68
2012	World Indoor Championships	Istanbul, Turkey	7th (h)	4 × 400 m relay	3:09.46
2012	European Championships	Helsinki, Finland	5th	4 × 400 m relay	3:02.72 (NR)
2013	European Indoor Championships	Gothenburg, Sweden	3rd	4 × 400 m relay	3:06.96
