= Gil Roberts =

American sprinter

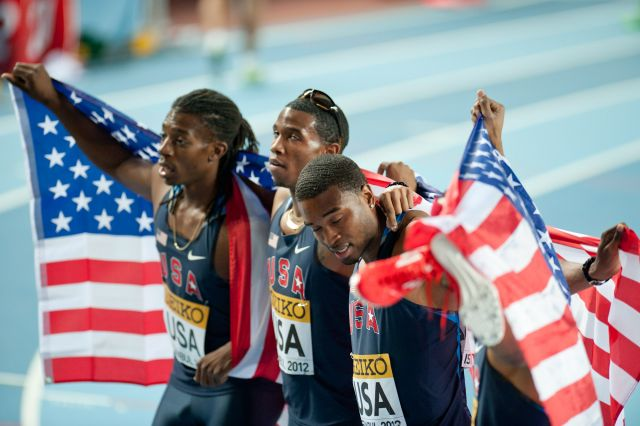
- Calvin Smith, Gil Roberts, Manteo Mitchell

Personal information
- Born: March 15, 1989 (age 37) Oklahoma City, Oklahoma
- Height: 1.85 m (6 ft 1 in)
- Weight: 79.5 kg (175 lb)

Sport
- College team: Texas Tech Red Raiders
Medal record
Men's athletics
Representing the United States
Olympic Games
Gold medal – first place	2016 Rio de Janeiro	4 × 400 m relay
World Championships
Silver medal – second place	2017 London	4 × 400 m relay
World Indoor Championships
Gold medal – first place	2012 Istanbul	4 × 400 m relay

Gil Roberts (born March 15, 1989) is an American athlete who specializes in the 200 m and 400 m. He is an Olympic gold medallist and World Championship silver medallist in the men's 4 × 400 metres relay.

== Career ==
He competed for Texas Tech under coach Wes Kittley at the NCAA level. He was a member of the USA team that won the gold medal in the Men's 4 × 400 metres relay at the 2012 IAAF World Indoor Championships. Roberts won the 2014 US Outdoor championship in 44.53 on June 28 in Sacramento, California.

While competing at the 2016 Summer Olympics, Roberts won an Olympic gold medal in the 4 × 400 m relay. Another Texas Tech athlete, Michael Mathieu won bronze in the same event competing for the Bahamas.

== Anti-doping rules violations ==
Roberts has been issued with three anti-doping rules violations (ADRV) during his career. In 2017 he tested positive for probenecid, but a tribunal hearing found that he "ingested [the] prohibited substance without fault or negligence" after the source was deemed to have occurred after kissing his girlfriend and therefore received no sanctions from the United States Anti-Doping Agency (USADA). The World Anti-Doping Agency (WADA) challenged the decision, but a tribunal dismissed their appeal.

In 2022, Roberts received a 16-month competition ban after testing positive for unintentional use of andarine and ostarine.

In June 2024, Roberts received an eight-year competition ban after testing positive for ostarine and other prohibited substances.
