= Artem Dyatlov =

Uzbekistani hurdler (born 1989)

Personal information
- Born: May 22, 1989 (age 37) Tashkent, Uzbekistan
- Height: 1.3 m (4 ft 3 in)
- Weight: 63 kg (139 lb)

Sport
- Country: Uzbekistan
- Sport: Athletics
- Event: 400 m hurdles

Artem Andreyevich Dyatlov (22 May 1989, Tashkent) is an Uzbekistani hurdler. At the 2012 Summer Olympics, he competed in the Men's 400 metres hurdles.
