= Tetsuya Tateno =

Japanese hurdler

Personal information
- Nationality: Japanese
- Born: 5 August 1991 (age 35) Koga, Ibaraki, Japan
- Education: Chuo University
- Height: 1.77 m (5 ft 10 in)
- Weight: 73 kg (161 lb)

Sport
- Country: Japan
- Sport: Athletics
- Event: 400m Hurdles

Achievements and titles
- Personal best: 400m hurdles: 49.49 (Osaka 2012)

Tetsuya Tateno (舘野 哲也, Tateno Tetsuya; born 5 August 1991 in Koga, Ibaraki) is a Japanese hurdler. At the 2012 Summer Olympics, he competed in the Men's 400 metres hurdles.

He is currently the head coach at the athletics club "Run for the Future".

He married Japanese hurdler Manami Kira in May 2020.

== International competition ==
Year	Competition	Venue	Position	Event	Time
Representing Japan
2012	Olympic Games	London, United Kingdom	25th (h)	400m hurdles	49.95

== Japanese Championships podiums ==
Year	Venue	Position	Event	Time
Representing Chuo University
2012	Osaka, Osaka	3rd	400m hurdles	49.49 PB
2012	Yokohama, Kanagawa	2nd	4 × 400 m relay	3:07.35 (relay leg: 3rd)

== National titles ==
- National Junior Championships
  - 400m hurdles: 2010
- National Junior High School Championships
  - Tetrathlon (400m, 110m hurdles, High Jump, Shot Put): 2006
