= Silvio Schirrmeister =

German hurdler (born 1988)

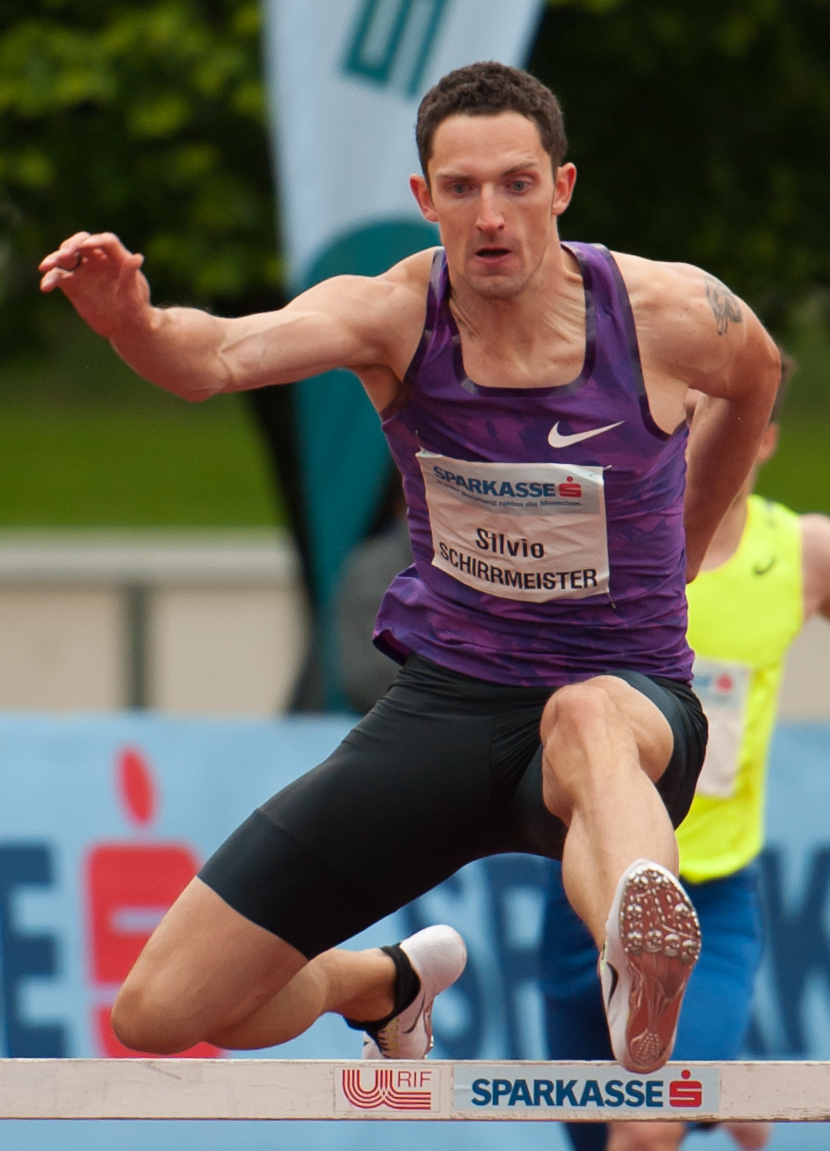
- Silvio Schirrmeister, Salzburg 2015

Personal information
- Born: December 7, 1988 (age 37) Neubrandenburg, East Germany
- Height: 1.93 m (6 ft 4 in)
- Weight: 82 kg (181 lb)

Sport
- Country: Germany
- Sport: Athletics
- Event: 400m Hurdles

Silvio Schirrmeister (born 7 December 1988, Neubrandenburg) is a German hurdler. At the 2012 Summer Olympics, he competed in the Men's 400 metres hurdles.
