= Frankie Wright =

American athlete (born 1985)

Personal information
- Born: February 1, 1985 (age 41) Baltimore, Maryland, U.S.
- Height: 1.85 m (6 ft 1 in)
- Weight: 75 kg (165 lb)

Sport
- Country: United States
- Sport: Athletics
- Events: 200 m, 400 m, 4 × 400 m Relay
Medal record
World Indoor Championships
| Gold medal – first place | 2012 Istanbul | 4 × 400 m relay |

Frankie Wright (born February 1, 1985) is an American athlete who specialises in the 200 m and 400 m. He was a member of the USA team that won the gold medal in the Men's 4 × 400 metres relay at the 2012 IAAF World Indoor Championships.

Wright competed for the Oklahoma Sooners track and field team in the NCAA.

== Personal bests ==
| Event | Time (seconds) | Venue |
|---|---|---|
| 200 meters (outdoor) | 21.29 | Arizona State University, United States |
| 200 meters (indoor) | 21.47 | Lincoln, Nebraska, United States |
| 400 meters (outdoor) | 46.16 | Paradise Valley, Arizona, United States |
| 400 meters (indoor) | 45.72 | Albuquerque, New Mexico, United States |
| Long Jump (Indoors) | 7.75m | Ames, Iowa, United States |
