= Dai Greene =

Welsh hurdler (born 1986)

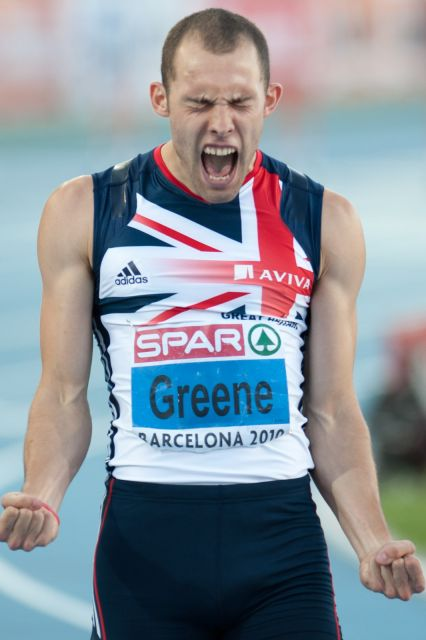
- Greene at the 2010 European Athletics Championships

Personal information
- Nationality: British (Welsh)
- Born: 11 April 1986 (age 40) Llanelli, Wales
- Height: 1.85 m (6 ft 1 in)
- Weight: 78 kg (172 lb)

Sport
- Sport: Athletics
- Events: 400 m, 400 m hurdles
- Club: Swansea Harriers

Achievements and titles
- Personal bests: 400 m: 45.82 (2011); 400 m hurdles: 47.84 (2012)
Medal record
Representing Great Britain
World Championships
Gold medal – first place	2011 Daegu	400 m hurdles
Silver medal – second place	2009 Berlin	4 × 400 m relay
Diamond League
Gold medal – first place	2011	400 m hurdles
Bronze medal – third place	2010	400 m hurdles
European Championships
Gold medal – first place	2010 Barcelona	400 m hurdles
Athletics World Cup
Bronze medal – third place	2018 London	400 m hurdles
European Team Championships
Gold medal – first place	2011 Stockholm	400 m hurdles
European U23 Championships
Gold medal – first place	2007 Debrecen	400 m hurdles
Representing Wales
Commonwealth Games
Gold medal – first place	2010 Delhi	400 m hurdles
Representing Europe
Continental Cup
Gold medal – first place	2010 Split	400 m hurdles

David "Dai" Greene (born 11 April 1986) is a Welsh retired hurdler who specialised in the 400 metres hurdles, competing internationally for both Wales and Great Britain, as well as Europe in the IAAF Intercontinental Cup.

In a 'golden' sixteen-month period between 2010 and 2011, Greene dominated his event at international level, winning every international title available in that period: he won the World, European, Diamond League and (for Wales) the Commonwealth Games titles in quick succession, in addition to winning the event as part of both the European Team Championships for Great Britain and the IAAF Continental Cup for Europe. Hindered by a knee injury in late 2011, Greene managed to finish in 4th at the 2012 Summer Olympics, but the same injury persisted thereafter and prevented him from being competitive again at the highest global level.

He is the second fastest British man over the 400 m hurdles, behind the British record holder, Kriss Akabusi and has captained the Great Britain team in several championships.

== Early life ==
Born in Llanelli near Felinfoel, Greene showed an aptitude for sport while attending Pen-y-gaer primary school. Inspired to follow his hero Ryan Giggs, he began practising football skills with his left foot. When aged 13, while attending Coedcae School, he joined the youth team set-up at Swansea City, playing left wing, and once scored a penalty against a Barcelona youth side. Turning down a contract to turn professional as a footballer aged 16, he continued his studies while still playing youth football for Manchester City youth side . After contracting Osgood-Schlatter disease during a growth spurt, he decided to give up football in his late teens for athletics, and he still runs to this day for Swansea Harriers Athletics Club. Aged 17, Greene was diagnosed with epilepsy, and continues to manage the condition today by avoiding late nights and alcohol, the main diagnosed triggers of his seizures. Greene is an ambassador for the charity Young Epilepsy.

== Athletics career ==
=== Junior and age-group ===
Moving to Cardiff to be coached by Benke Blomqvist, Greene had his first success on the junior athletics circuit in 2005. He won the silver medal at the 2005 European Athletics Junior Championships, finishing with a personal best time of 51.14 seconds. The following year he competed in his first senior tournament, the 2006 European Athletics Championships, but he failed to progress beyond the heats with a run of 50.66 seconds. His age-group success continued, however, as he won the gold medal at the 2007 European Athletics U23 Championships with a new best of 49.58 seconds. He beat Frenchman Fadil Bellaabouss by a narrow margin to mark an impressive return, following an ankle injury which had ruled him out for six weeks of the season.

After his coach Blomqvist decided to return to Sweden for family reasons, from 2009 Greene moved to the University of Bath, to allow him to train under coach Malcolm Arnold, supported by the Wells Sports Foundation. He was later joined by fellow Welsh 400 m hurdler Rhys Williams, who became his training partner.

=== Seniors career ===
The 2009 outdoor season saw Greene making his first impact on the senior circuit. In June he set a meet record and a new personal best of 48.62 seconds to win the 400 m hurdles at the Josef Odlozil Memorial in Prague. This was a significant improvement from his 2008 best of 49.58 seconds and made him top of the European rankings for the first time. Competing for Team GB at the 2009 World Championships, Greene won his heat with a strong first round performance of 48.76 seconds. He followed this with a new personal best in the semi-finals, finishing in 48.27 seconds to take second place behind Bershawn Jackson. He finished 7th in the final of the men's 400 m hurdles, and received a silver medal for the 4 × 400 m relay, despite only running in the semi-final, being replaced in the final by Michael Bingham.

=== 2010 and 2011: Senior success ===
On 31 July 2010, he won the Gold Medal in the 400 m hurdles at the European Athletics Championships in Barcelona, with fellow Welshman Rhys Williams getting the silver. On 10 October 2010, Greene won the gold medal in the Commonwealth Games in Delhi.

On 1 September 2011, at the World Athletics Championships in Daegu, South Korea, Greene won the gold medal, overtaking a strong field in the final straight.

In 2011 Greene was named an Ambassador for the Jaguar Academy of Sport.

=== 2012 to present ===
At the Diamond League event in Paris on 6 July 2012, Greene ran a personal best of 47.84 secs in finishing second to Javier Culson to move even closer to the British record in the 400 m hurdles. Greene was selected to captain the Great Britain athletics team for the 2012 London Olympics, as one of the favourites for a medal. In the first round of the 400 m hurdles Greene won his heat in 48.98s, the fastest time of round. In the semi-finals Greene ran sluggishly, finishing fourth and only qualifying for the final as a fastest loser. In the final Greene finished fourth behind 2004 Olympic champion Félix Sánchez, surprise American Michael Tinsley and Javier Culson, running slower than he had in the semi-final. Post-race Greene admitted huge disappointment, and blamed disruption to his training caused by a knee injury in the winter. Greene also ran in the final of the 4 × 400 metres relay, as the British team finished fourth, just 0.13 seconds off a medal.

Greene's injury problems continued throughout 2013 and 2014, interrupting his training regime and preventing him from successfully defending his 2011 World crown in Moscow where Greene was eliminated in the semi-final. An attempt to retain his Commonwealth title also ended in the semi-finals, while running nearly two seconds outside his personal best. Greene resultantly withdrew himself from consideration for the 2014 European Athletics Championships, because of lack of form and a failure to make the agreed qualification time.

In light of further injury issues, which resulted in him missing the 2016 Summer Olympics in Brazil, in November 2016 Greene was stripped of his UK National Lottery funding by UK Athletics, and hence omitted from UKA's world-class performance programme from 2017 onwards. Despite this further setback, Greene continued to train through 2017. Free of injury for the first time in several years, Greene began returning to form through 2018, culminating in winning the British championships in July of that year, sealing qualification for both the 2018 European Athletics Championships, and the inaugural Athletics World Cup.

Greene announced his retirement from athletics on 19 July 2024.

== Personal bests ==
Event	Best	Location	Date
400 metres	45.82 s	Birmingham, England	31 July 2011
400 metres hurdles	47.84 s	Paris, France	6 July 2012

== Awards ==
- 2010 – Brin Isaac sportsperson of the year
- 2011 – Greene received the 'Jump off the Sofa Moment' Award at the Jaguar Academy of Sport Annual Awards for his victory at the World Athletics Championships in Daegu.
