= Michael Tinsley =

American hurdler

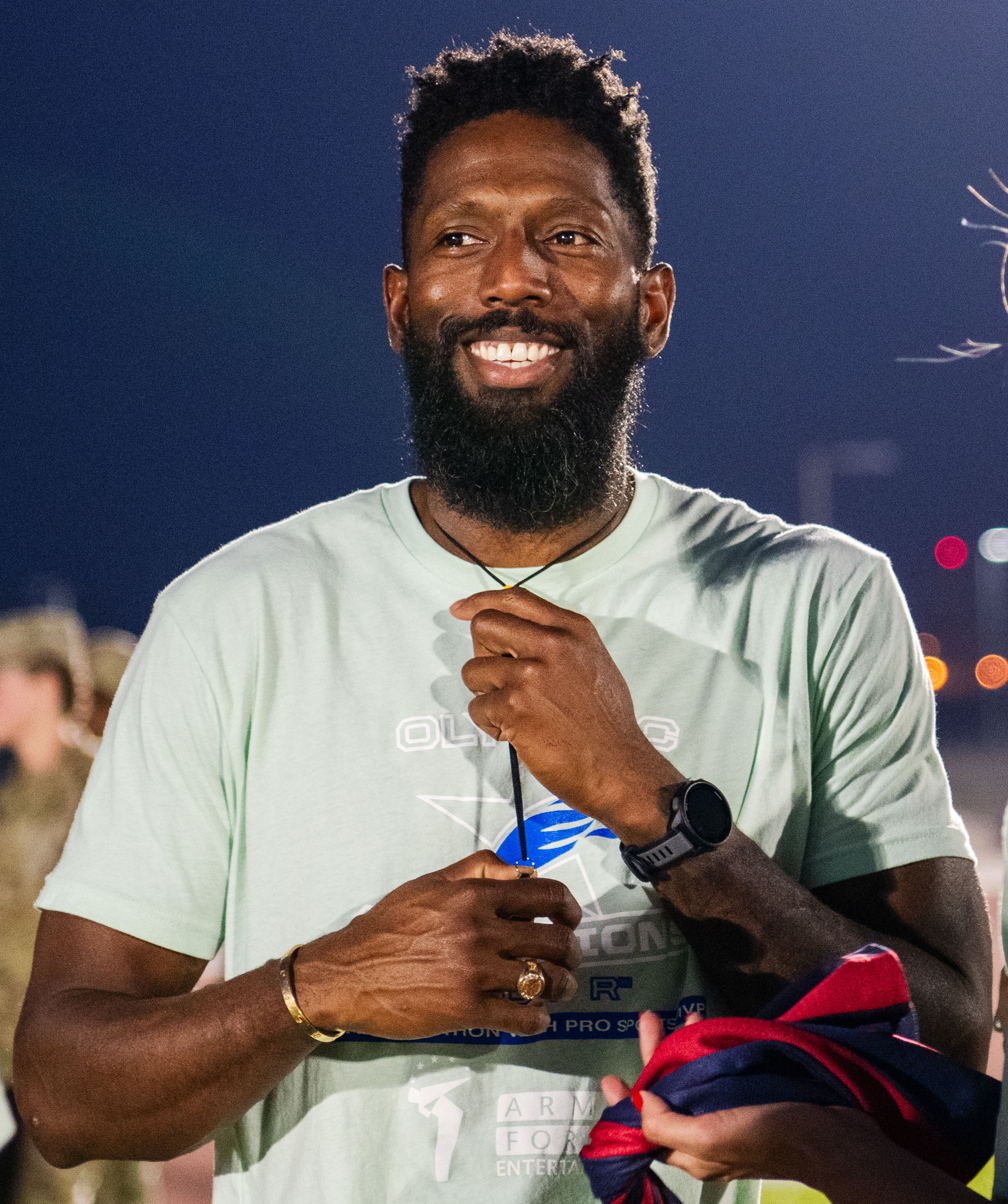
- Tinsley in 2024

Personal information
- Nickname: Mike.T
- Nationality: American
- Born: April 21, 1984 (age 42) Little Rock, Arkansas, U.S.
- Height: 6’0”ft (1.83m)
- Weight: 180 lb (82 kg)

Sport
- Country: USA
- Sport: Track and field
- Event: 400m Hurdles
- University team: Jackson State Tigers
- Turned pro: 2006
- Coached by: Darryl Woodson

Achievements and titles
- Personal bests: 200m: 20.66s (Oxford 2009); 400m: 46.05s (Greensboro 2007); 400mh: 47.70s (Moscow 2013)
Medal record
Men's athletics
Representing the United States
Olympic Games
Silver medal – second place	2012 London	400 m hurdles
World Championships
Silver medal – second place	2013 Moscow	400 m hurdles
- Updated on 15 August 2013

Michael Tinsley (born April 21, 1984) is an American track and field athlete specializing in the 400 metres hurdles.

== Early life ==
Tinsley, a native of Little Rock, Arkansas, was born on April 21, 1984. He attended Little Rock's Joe T. Robinson High School and Jackson State University.

== Career ==
Tinsley achieved a personal best in the 400-meter hurdles in 2007 with a time of 48.02 seconds. He placed third at the 2010 USA Outdoor Track and Field Championships with a time of 48.46 seconds. He won the 400-meter hurdles event at the 2012 US Olympic Trials with a time of 48.33 seconds and earned a spot on the US Olympic team.

Tinsley won his first heat in the 400-meter hurdles at the Olympics in 49.13 seconds. He then won his semifinal in a season best time of 48.13 seconds. On August 6, 2012 Tinsley won silver at the 2012 London Olympics in the 400 meters hurdles, in a new personal best time of 47.91. In 2013, Tinsley followed up his silver medal at the London Olympics with a silver medal at the 2013 World Championships in Moscow.

== Personal life ==
Tinsley has two sons, MyKayle 17 and Titus 10.
