= Jorge Paula =

Portuguese hurdler

Personal information
- Born: 8 October 1984 (age 41)
- Height: 1.90 m (6 ft 3 in)
- Weight: 85 kg (187 lb)

Sport
- Country: Portugal
- Sport: Athletics
- Event: 400m Hurdles

Jorge Paula (born 8 October 1984) is a Portuguese hurdler who represented his country in the men's 400 metres hurdles at the 2012 Summer Olympics.

He is of Cape Verdean descent.
