= Li Zhilong =

Chinese hurdler

Personal information
- Born: March 9, 1988 (age 38)
- Height: 1.8 m (5 ft 11 in)
- Weight: 70 kg (150 lb)

Sport
- Country: China
- Sport: Athletics
- Event: 400m Hurdles

Li Zhilong (born March 9, 1988, in Beijing) is a Chinese 2012 Olympics athlete who competes in the 400 metre hurdles.

== See also ==
- China at the 2012 Summer Olympics - Athletics
  - Athletics at the 2012 Summer Olympics – Men's 400 metres hurdles
