= Jonas Plass =

German sprinter

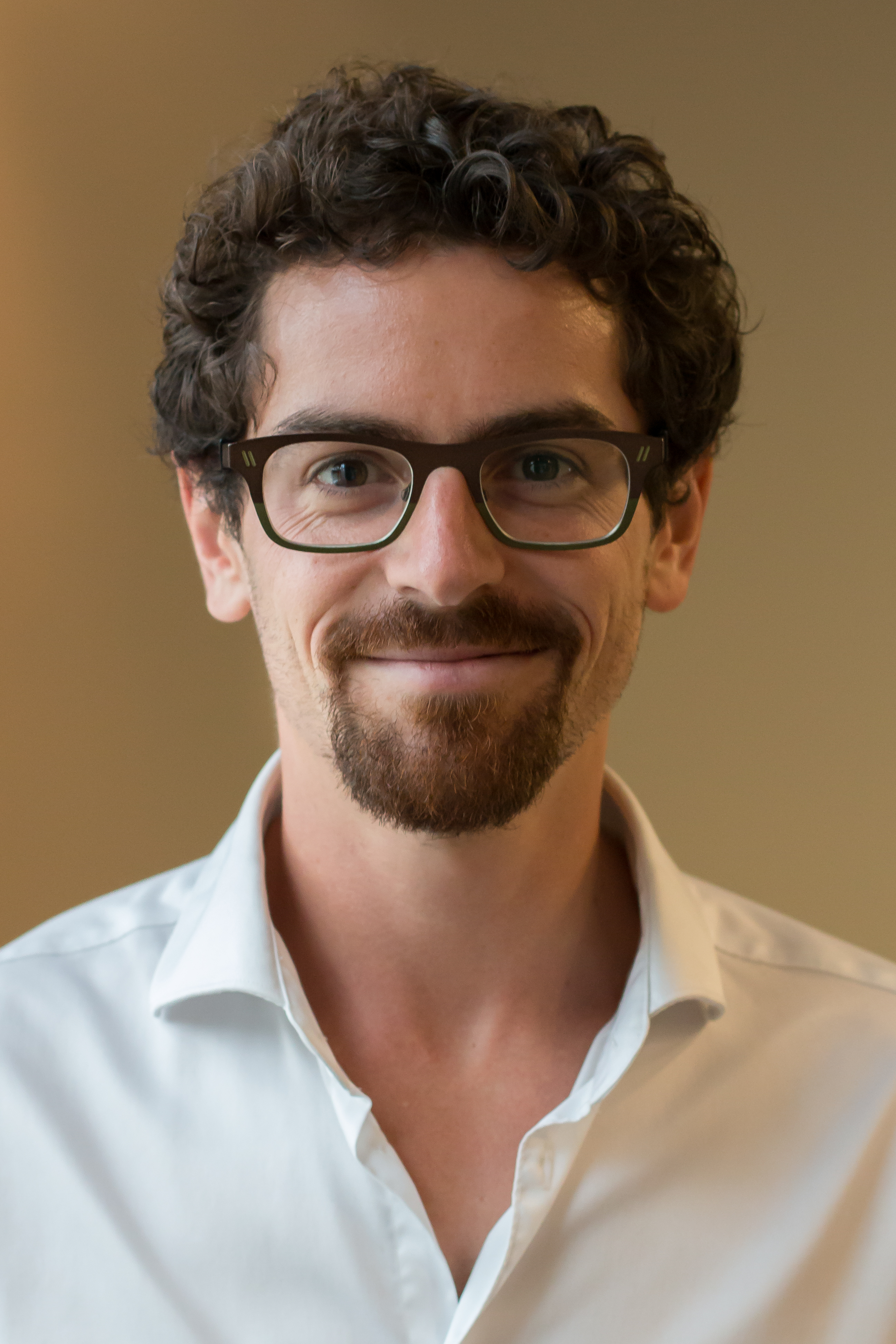

Personal information
- Full name: Jonas Plass
- Born: 1 August 1986 (age 39) Bamberg, West Germany
- Height: 1.83 m (6 ft 0 in)
- Weight: 75 kg (165 lb)

Sport
- Country: Germany
- Sport: Athletics
- Event: 400 metres

Achievements and titles
- Regional finals: 3rd at the 2012 European Athletics Championships
- Personal best(s): 400 metres: 46.00 (Ulm; July 2009)

Jonas Plass (born 1 August 1986 in Bamberg) is a German athlete who competes in the sprint with a personal best time of 46.00 seconds over the 400 metres.

Plass won the bronze medal at the 2012 European Athletics Championships in Helsinki in the 4 × 400 metres relay.
