= Anton Kokorin =

Russian sprinter

Personal information
- Full name: Anton Sergeyevich Kokorin
- Born: 5 April 1987 (age 39) Tashkent, Uzbek SSR, Soviet Union

Sport
- Country: Russia
- Sport: Athletics
- Event: 4 × 400m Relay
Medal record
Olympic Games
Disqualified	2008 Beijing	4x400 m relay

Anton Sergeyevich Kokorin (Russian: Антон Серге́евич Кокорин) (born April 5, 1987 in Tashkent, Uzbek SSR) is a Russian sprint athlete. Anton was part of the team that finished third in Men's 4x400 m relay at the 2008 Summer Olympics, but the team was disqualified after team mate Denis Alekseyev tested positive for doping.

Kokorin competed for the South Plains Texans track and field team in the NJCAA and the Arkansas Razorbacks track and field team in the NCAA after winning his Olympic medal.
