= Denis Alekseyev =

Russian sprinter (born 1987)

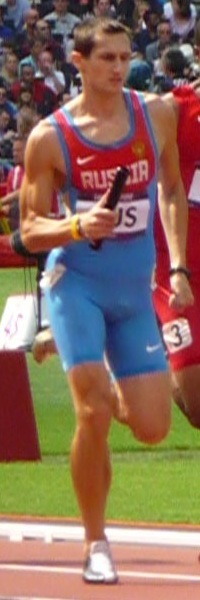

Personal information
- Born: 21 December 1987 (age 38)
- Height: 1.86 m (6 ft 1 in)
- Weight: 75 kg (165 lb)

Sport
- Country: Russia
- Sport: Athletics
- Event: 4 × 400 metres relay
Medal record
Olympic Games
Disqualified	2008 Beijing	4x400 m relay

Denis Sergeyevich Alekseyev (Russian: Денис Серге́евич Алексеев; born 21 December 1987) is a Russian sprint athlete, born in St. Petersburg.

== Doping ban ==
Alekseyev tested positive for the anabolic steroid Dehydrochloromethyltestosterone (Oral Turinabol) in an out-of-competition control 27 June 2013 and was subsequently handed a two-year ban from sports. The ban ended 3 July 2015.

In May 2016, it was reported that Alekseyev was one of 14 Russian athletes, and nine medalists, implicated in doping following the retesting of urine from the 2008 Olympic Games. Alekseyev was named by Russian press agency TASS as having failed the retest, which was undertaken following the Russian doping scandal of 2015 and 2016. If confirmed, under IOC and IAAF rules, he stands to lose all results, medals and records from the date of the original test to May 2016. As this would be a second doping offence, he also faces a lifetime ban from sport. By 13 September 2016 his doping case and subsequent disqualification from the 2008 Summer Olympics was confirmed, and he and the Russian 4x400m relay team were stripped of their bronze medals.
