= Vyacheslav Sakayev =

Russian athlete (born 1988)

Vyacheslav Sakayev (Сакаев Вячеслав; born 12 January 1988 in Novosibirsk Oblast) is a Russian athlete, who specializes in 400 m hurdles. His personal best is 49.59s, set when he won the National Championships in Cheboksary on 4 July 2012 when he qualified for the 2012 London Olympic Games.

He won the silver medal at 2007 European Athletics Junior Championships and finished in 6th at the 2006 World Junior Championships.
