= 2002 IAAF World Cup – Results =

These are the results of the 2002 IAAF World Cup, which took place in Madrid, Spain on 21 and 22 September 2002.

== Results ==
=== 100 m ===
==== Men ====
Pos.	Team	Competitor	Result
1	AFR	Uchenna Emedolu	10.06 PB
2	AME	Kim Collins	10.06
3	EUR	Francis Obikwelu	10.09
4	USA	Jon Drummond	10.10
5	ASI	Jamal Al-Saffar	10.38
6	GER	Marc Blume	10.46
7	OCE	Patrick Johnson	10.58
8	ESP	Angel David Rodríguez	10.78
DQ	GBR	Dwain Chambers	10.16

==== Women ====
Pos.	Team	Competitor	Result
1	AME	Tayna Lawrence	11.06
2	ASI	Susanthika Jayasinghe	11.20
3	AFR	Endurance Ojokolo	11.26
4	ESP	Glory Alozie	11.28
5	GER	Melanie Paschke	11.37
6	RUS	Marina Kislova	11.41
7	EUR	Kim Gevaert	11.41
8	OCE	Lauren Hewitt	11.48
DQ	USA	Marion Jones	10.90

=== 200 m ===
==== Men ====
Pos.	Team	Competitor	Result
1	EUR	Francis Obikwelu	20.18 SB
2	AFR	Frankie Fredericks	20.20
3	GBR	Marlon Devonish	20.32
4	USA	Ramon Clay	20.32
5	AME	Dominic Demeritte	20.47
6	ASI	Gennadiy Chernovol	20.73
7	ESP	Julian Martínez	21.23
8	GER	Oliver Koenig	21.32
9	OCE	Dallas Roberts	21.61

==== Women ====
Pos.	Team	Competitor	Result
1	AME	Debbie Ferguson	22.49
2	EUR	Muriel Hurtis	22.78
3	AFR	Myriam Léonie Mani	22.81 SB
4	ASI	Susanthika Jayasinghe	22.82 SB
5	OCE	Lauren Hewitt	23.30
6	RUS	Marina Kislova	23.38
7	USA	Kelli White	23.51
8	GER	Gabi Rockmeier	23.67
9	ESP	Julia Alba	24.21

=== 400 m ===
==== Men ====
Pos.	Team	Competitor	Result
1	AME	Michael Blackwood	44.60 PB
2	GER	Ingo Schultz	44.86 SB
3	ASI	Fawzi Al-Shammari	45.14
4	AFR	Eric Milazar	45.41
5	USA	Alvin Harrison	45.46
6	OCE	Clinton Hill	45.74
7	GBR	Timothy Benjamin	45.80
8	ESP	David Canal	46.21
9	EUR	Zsolt Szeglet	46.26

==== Women ====
Pos.	Team	Competitor	Result
1	AME	Ana Guevara	49.56
2	USA	Jearl Miles Clark	50.27 SB
3	RUS	Olesya Zykina	50.67
4	EUR	Lee McConnell	50.82 PB
5	AFR	Kaltouma Nadjina	51.11
6	GER	Claudia Marx	52.30
7	ASI	Tatyana Roslanova	52.44
8	OCE	Rosemary Hayward	52.76 PB
9	ESP	Miriam Bravo	53.79 SB

=== 800 m ===
==== Men ====
Pos.	Team	Competitor	Result
1	ESP	Antonio Manuel Reina	1:43.83 CR
2	AFR	Djabir Saïd-Guerni	1:44.03 SB
3	USA	David Krummenacker	1:45.14
4	EUR	André Bucher	1:45.31
5	GER	Nils Schumann	1:45.34
6	AME	Osmar dos Santos	1:46.01 SB
7	ASI	Mihail Kolganov	1:47.45 PB
8	GBR	James McIlroy	1:48.43
	OCE	Kris McCarthy	DNF

==== Women ====
Pos.	Team	Competitor	Result
1	AFR	Maria de Lurdes Mutola	1:58.60
2	ESP	Mayte Martínez	1:59.24
3	EUR	Jolanda Čeplak	1:59.42
4	AME	Zulia Calatayud	1:59.44
5	RUS	Svetlana Cherkasova	2:00.72
6	GER	Claudia Gesell	2:01.58
7	USA	Sasha Spencer	2:02.92
8	OCE	Tamsyn Lewis	2:03.10
9	ASI	Miho Sugimori	2:03.22 PB

=== 1500 m ===
==== Men ====
Pos.	Team	Competitor	Result
1	AFR	Bernard Lagat	3:31.20 CR
2	ESP	Reyes Estévez	3:33.67
3	EUR	Mehdi Baala	3:38.04
4	OCE	Youcef Abdi	3:41.01
5	GER	Franek Haschke	3:41.58
6	GBR	Michael East	3:41.88
7	ASI	Abdulrahman Suleiman	3:42.27
8	AME	Hudson Santos de Souza	3:42.58
9	USA	Seneca Lassiter	4:05.82

==== Women ====
Pos.	Team	Competitor	Result
1	EUR	Süreyya Ayhan	4:02.57
2	RUS	Tatyana Tomashova	4:09.74
3	GER	Kathleen Friedrich	4:10.20
4	USA	Regina Jacobs	4:10.78
5	AFR	Jackline Maranga	4:11.10
6	ASI	Tatyana Borisova	4:11.14 PB
7	ESP	Nuria Fernández	4:11.56
8	OCE	Sarah Jamieson	4:12.33
9	AME	Mardrea Hyman	4:14.60

=== 3000 m ===
==== Men ====
Pos.	Team	Competitor	Result
1	OCE	Craig Mottram	7:41.37 CR
2	AME	José David Galván	7:47.43 SB
3	ESP	Roberto García	7:53.96
4	AFR	Paul Bitok	7:56.31
5	GBR	Anthony Whiteman	8:03.33
6	ASI	Ahmed Ibrahim Hashim	8:08.31
7	EUR	Serhiy Lebid	8:08.65
8	USA	Bolota Asmerom	8:10.66
9	GER	Raphael Schäfer	8:33.89

==== Women ====
Pos.	Team	Competitor	Result
1	AFR	Berhane Adere	8:50.88
2	EUR	Gabriela Szabo	8:50.89
3	RUS	Yelena Zadorozhnaya	8:50.93
4	USA	Sarah Schwald	8:57.27
5	OCE	Susie Power	8:58.09
6	ESP	Beatriz Santiago	8:59.88
7	AME	Courtney Babcock	9:05.98
8	GER	Melanie Schulz	9:10.57 PB
9	ASI	Mizuho Nasukawa	9:23.47 PB

=== 5000 m ===
==== Men ====
Pos.	Team	Competitor	Result
1	ESP	Alberto García	13:30.04
2	AFR	Paul Malakwen Kosgei	13:31.71
3	EUR	Ismaïl Sghyr	13:32.82
4	USA	Meb Keflezighi	13:33.44
5	GBR	John Mayock	13:38.63
6	GER	Michael May	13:39.73
7	ASI	Abdulhak Zakaria	13:54.68 PB
8	OCE	Michael Power	13:58.07
9	AME	Sean Kaley	13:33.57

==== Women ====
Pos.	Team	Competitor	Result
1	RUS	Olga Yegorova	15:18.15 CR
2	ESP	Marta Domínguez	15:19.73
3	EUR	Joanne Pavey	15:20.10
4	OCE	Benita Johnson	15:20.83
5	AFR	Susan Chepkemei	15:27.04
6	ASI	Akiko Kawashima	15:41.95
7	GER	Sabrina Mockenhaupt	15:42.22
8	AME	Nora Leticia Rocha	15:45.48
9	USA	Collette Liss	15:59.44

=== 3000 m Steeplechase ===
==== Men ====
Pos.	Team	Competitor	Result
1	AFR	Wilson Boit Kipketer	8:25.34
2	ESP	Luis Miguel Martín	8:26.35
3	ASI	Khamis Abdullah Saifeldin	8:30.66
4	USA	Anthony Famiglietti	8:32.72
5	EUR	Simon Vroemen	8:36.06
6	OCE	Peter Nowill	8:39.22 SB
7	GER	Filmon Ghirmai	8:42.29
8	GBR	Stuart Stokes	8:43.38
9	AME	Joël Bourgeois	8:56.13

=== 100/110 m hurdles ===
==== Men (110 m) ====
Pos.	Team	Competitor	Result
1	AME	Anier García	13.10
2	USA	Allen Johnson	13.45
3	EUR	Staņislavs Olijars	13.58
4	AFR	Shaun Bownes	13.67
5	ESP	Felipe Vivancos	13.79 PB
6	GER	Florian Schwarthoff	13.79
7	OCE	Tim Ewen	14.10
DQ	GBR	Colin Jackson
DNF	ASI	Liu Xiang

==== Women (100 m) ====
Pos.	Team	Competitor	Result
1	USA	Gail Devers	12.65
2	AME	Brigitte Foster	12.82
3	ESP	Glory Alozie	12.95
4	EUR	Olena Krasovska	13.07
5	AFR	Rosa Rakotozafy	13.07
6	RUS	Svetlana Laukhova	13.14
7	GER	Kirsten Bolm	13.15
8	OCE	Jacquie Munro	13.46
9	ASI	Yvonne Kanazawa	13.59

=== 400 m hurdles ===
==== Men ====
Pos.	Team	Competitor	Result
1	USA	James Carter	48.27
2	ASI	Mubarak Faraj Al-Nubi	48.96
3	GBR	Christopher Rawlinson	49.18
4	EUR	Jirí Muzik	49.28
5	AME	Ian Weakley	49.62
6	ESP	José María Romera	49.68
7	AFR	Llewellyn Herbert	50.52
8	GER	Christian Duma	50.57
9	OCE	Mowen Boino	51.66

==== Women ====
Pos.	Team	Competitor	Result
1	RUS	Yuliya Pechonkina	53.74
2	USA	Sandra Glover	54.46
3	OCE	Jana Pittman	55.15
4	EUR	Ionela Târlea	56.17
5	ASI	Natalya Torshina	56.38
6	AME	Debbie-Ann Parris	57.36
7	GER	Heike Meissner	57.40
8	AFR	Zahra Lachgar	59.14
9	ESP	Beatriz Montero	59.79

=== 4 × 100 m relay ===
==== Men ====
Pos.	Team	Competitor	Result
1	USA	Jon Drummond, Jason Smoots, Kaaron Conwright, Coby Miller	37.95 CR
2	AME	Freddy Mayola, Kim Collins, Christopher Williams, Dominic Demeritte	38.32
3	AFR	Idrissa Sanou, Uchenna Emedolu, Aziz Zakari, Frankie Fredericks	38.63
4	EUR	Kostyantyn Vasyukov, Kostyantyn Rurak, Anatoliy Dovhal, Oleksandr Kaydash	38.86
5	ASI	Reanchai Srihawong, Vissanu Sophanich, Ekkachai Janthana, Sittichai Suwonprateep	38.91 PB
6	GBR	Jonathan Barbour, Marlon Devonish, Christian Malcolm, Daniel Plummer	39.23
7	OCE	Tim Williams, Paul Di Bella, David Geddes, Patrick Johnson	39.58
8	ESP	Cecilio Maestra, Pedro Pablo Nolet, Angel David Rodríguez, Carlos Berlanga	39.64
	GER	Ronny Ostwald, Marc Blume, Alexander Kosenkow, Marc Kochan	DQ

==== Women ====
Pos.	Team	Competitor	Result
1	AME	Tayna Lawrence, Juliet Campbell, Beverly McDonald, Debbie Ferguson	41.91 WL
2	AFR	Chinedu Odozor, Myriam Léonie Mani, Makaridja Sanganoko, Endurance Ojokolo	42.99
3	EUR	Delphine Combe, Muriel Hurtis, Fabe Dia, Odiah Sidibé	43.30
4	GER	Melanie Paschke, Gabi Rockmeier, Birgit Rockmeier, Katchi Habel	43.36
5	RUS	Natalya Ignatova, Larisa Kruglova, Irina Khabarova, Marina Kislova	43.69
6	ASI	Zeng Xiujun, Yan Jiankui, Huang Mei, Qin Wangping	43.82
7	ESP	Carmen Blay, Arantxa Reinares, Concepción Montaner, Julia Alba	45.07
	USA	Chryste Gaines, Marion Jones, Inger Miller, Gail Devers	DQ (r40.8) (42.05)
	OCE	Melanie Kleeberg, Jodi Lambert, Lauren Hewitt, Sarah Mullan	DQ (r170.14)

=== 4 × 400 m relay ===
==== Men ====
Pos.	Team	Competitor	Result
1	AME	Félix Sánchez, Alleyne Francique, Michael McDonald, Michael Blackwood	2:59.19 WL
2	AFR	Adem Hecini, Sofiane Labidi, Fernando Augustin, Eric Milazar	3:01.69
3	ASI	Rohan Pradeep Kumara, Hamdan O. Al-Bishi, Sugath Thilakaratne, Fawzi Al-Shammari	3:03.02 PB
4	GBR	Jared Deacon, Jamie Baulch, Timothy Benjamin, Matthew Elias	3:03.34
5	OCE	Daniel Batman, Patrick Dwyer, Paul Pearce, Clinton Hill	3:03.65
6	GER	Ingo Schultz, Ruwen Faller, Jens Dautzenberg, Lars Figura	3:05.31
DQ	ESP	Salvador Rodríguez, David Canal, Antonio Manuel Reina, Alberto Martínez
DQ	EUR	Oleksandr Kaydash, Cédric Van Branteghem, Francis Obikwelu, Karel Bláha
DQ	USA	James Carter, Leonard Byrd, Godfrey Herring, Antonio Pettigrew	2:59.21

==== Women ====
Pos.	Team	Competitor	Result
1	AME	Sandie Richards, Daimí Pernía, Christine Amertil, Ana Guevara	3:23.53
2	USA	Michelle Collins, Crystal Cox, Suziann Reid, Monique Hennagan	3:24.67
3	RUS	Natalya Antyukh, Yuliya Pechonkina, Natalya Nazarova, Olesya Zykina	3:26.59
4	AFR	Mireille Nguimgo, Hortense Bewouda, Maria de Lurdes Mutola, Kaltouma Nadjina	3:26.84 PB
5	EUR	Grażyna Prokopek, Antonina Yefremova, Sviatlana Usovich, Lee McConnell	3:29.21
6	GER	Florence Ekpo-Umoh, Nancy Kette, Birgit Rockmeier, Claudia Marx	3:31.09
7	OCE	Rosemary Hayward, Jana Pittman, Katerina Dressler, Tamsyn Lewis	3:31.32
8	ESP	Julia Alba, Mayte Martínez, Miriam Bravo, Maripaz Maqueda	3:36.50
9	ASI	Tatyana Roslanova, Zamira Amirova, Thi Tinh Nguyen, Makiko Yoshida	3:37.18

=== High jump ===
==== Men ====
Pos.	Team	Competitor	Result
1	EUR	Yaroslav Rybakov	2.31 SB
2	AME	Mark Boswell	2.29
3	GBR	Ben Challenger	2.20
4	AFR	Abderrahmane Hammad	2.15
5	ESP	Ignacio Pérez	2.15
6	GER	Martin Buss	2.15
7	USA	Nathan Leeper	2.10
8	ASI	Cui Kai	2.10
	OCE	Nick Moroney	NM

==== Women ====
Pos.	Team	Competitor	Result
1	AFR	Hestrie Cloete	2.02 SB
2	EUR	Kajsa Bergqvist	2.02
3	RUS	Marina Kuptsova	2.00 PB
4	USA	Tisha Waller	1.96 SB
5	ASI	Tatyana Efimenko	1.91 PB
6	ESP	Ruth Beitia	1.91
7	GER	Kathryn Holinski	1.91
8	AME	Nicole Forrester	1.85
9	OCE	Jane Jamieson	1.75

=== Pole vault ===
==== Men ====
Pos.	Team	Competitor	Result
1	AFR	Okkert Brits	5.75 SB
2	USA	Jeff Hartwig	5.70
3	GER	Lars Börgeling	5.40
4	AME	Dominic Johnson	5.20
5	ESP	Andrés Hinojo	5.20
6	OCE	Paul Burgess	5.20
7	GBR	Tim Thomas	5.00
	EUR	Aleksandr Averbukh	NM
	ASI	Daichi Sawano	NM

==== Women ====
Pos.	Team	Competitor	Result
1	GER	Annika Becker	4.55
2	RUS	Svetlana Feofanova	4.40
3	ESP	Dana Cervantes	4.30
4	ASI	Gao Shuying	4.30
5	EUR	Monique de Wilt	4.20
6	AFR	Syrine Balti	4.10 PB
7	USA	Mary Sauer	4.00
	OCE	Tatiana Grigorieva	NM
	AME	Stephanie McCann	NM

=== Long jump ===
==== Men ====
Pos.	Team	Competitor	Result
1	USA	Savanté Stringfellow	8.21
2	AME	Iván Pedroso	8.19
3	ESP	Yago Lamela	8.11
4	ASI	Hussein Taher Al-Sabee	7.92
5	AFR	Younes Moudrik	7.90
6	GBR	Christopher Tomlinson	7.85
7	EUR	Olexiy Lukashevych	7.83
8	OCE	Tim Parravicini	7.69
9	GER	Andreas Pohle	7.26

==== Women ====
Pos.	Team	Competitor	Result
1	RUS	Tatyana Kotova	6.85
2	AME	Maurren Higa Maggi	6.81
3	ESP	Concepción Montaner	6.68
4	EUR	Jade Johnson	6.41
5	OCE	Chantal Brunner	6.35
6	ASI	Yelena Kashcheyeva	6.32
7	GER	Sofia Schulte	6.16
8	AFR	Françoise Mbango Etone	6.06
9	USA	Brianna Glenn	5.91

=== Triple jump ===
==== Men ====
Pos.	Team	Competitor	Result
1	GBR	Jonathan Edwards	17.34
2	USA	Walter Davis	17.23
3	EUR	Christian Olsson	17.05
4	GER	Charles Michael Friedek	16.91
5	AME	Jadel Gregório	16.61
6	ASI	Kazuyoshi Ishikawa	16.50 PB
7	AFR	Olivier Sanou	16.30
8	ESP	Raúl Chapado	15.91
9	OCE	Viktor Chistiakov	14.96

==== Women ====
Pos.	Team	Competitor	Result
1	AFR	Françoise Mbango Etone	14.37
2	EUR	Ashia Hansen	14.32
3	ESP	Carlota Castrejana	14.13
4	AME	Trecia Smith	13.82
5	USA	Yuliana Perez	13.79
6	RUS	Yelena Oleynikova	13.79
7	ASI	Wu Lingmei	13.60
8	GER	Sofia Schulte	12.73
9	OCE	Michelle Apostolou	12.12

=== Shot put ===
==== Men ====
Pos.	Team	Competitor	Result
1	USA	Adam Nelson	20.80
2	OCE	Justin Anlezark	20.77
3	GER	Ralf Bartels	20.67
4	AFR	Janus Robberts	20.00
5	EUR	Yuriy Bilonoh	19.88
6	ESP	Manuel Martínez	19.76
7	GBR	Carl Myerscough	19.13
8	AME	Bradley Snyder	18.99
9	ASI	Li Rongxiang	10.09

==== Women ====
Pos.	Team	Competitor	Result
1	RUS	Irina Korzhanenko	20.20
2	AME	Yumileidi Cumbá	19.14
3	GER	Astrid Kumbernuss	19.11
4	EUR	Vita Pavlysh	19.06
5	USA	Teri Steer	18.63
6	OCE	Valerie Adams	18.40 PB
7	AFR	Vivian Chukwuemeka	17.30
8	ASI	Juttaporn Krasaeyan	17.25
9	ESP	Irache Quintanal	15.79

=== Discus throw ===
==== Men ====
Pos.	Team	Competitor	Result
1	EUR	Róbert Fazekas	71.25 CR
2	AFR	Frantz Kruger	66.78
3	ESP	Mario Pestano	64.64
4	GER	Michael Möllenbeck	64.57
5	AME	Jason Tunks	62.89
6	USA	Adam Setliff	61.52
7	GBR	Robert Weir	58.91
8	OCE	Peter Elvy	56.60
9	ASI	Koji Murofushi	41.93

==== Women ====
Pos.	Team	Competitor	Result
1	OCE	Beatrice Faumuina	62.47
2	EUR	Ekaterini Voggoli	61.77
3	RUS	Natalya Sadova	61.30
4	ASI	Li Yanfeng	59.89
5	USA	Kristin Kuehl	59.57
6	GER	Jana Tucholke	57.94
7	AFR	Monia Kari	56.16
8	ESP	Alice Matejková	56.05
9	AME	Elisângela Adriano	53.60

=== Hammer throw ===
==== Men ====
Pos.	Team	Competitor	Result
1	EUR	Adrián Annus	80.93
2	ASI	Koji Murofushi	80.08
3	GER	Karsten Kobs	78.44
4	AFR	Chris Harmse	77.16
5	ESP	Moisés Campeny	73.21 SB
6	USA	John McEwen	71.03
7	OCE	Philip Jensen	67.09
8	GBR	Michael Jones	66.92
9	AME	Yosvany Suárez	66.33

==== Women ====
Pos.	Team	Competitor	Result
1	ASI	Gu Yuan	70.75
2	AME	Yipsi Moreno	69.65
3	RUS	Olga Kuzenkova	66.98
4	USA	Anna Mahon	65.94
5	EUR	Kamila Skolimowska	65.24
6	GER	Susanne Keil	64.62
7	OCE	Bronwyn Eagles	63.49
8	ESP	Berta Castells	63.49
9	AFR	Marwa Hussein	58.49

=== Javelin throw ===
==== Men ====
Pos.	Team	Competitor	Result
1	EUR	Sergey Makarov	86.44
2	GER	Boris Henry	81.60
3	AME	Emeterio González	79.77
4	GBR	Steve Backley	79.39
5	AFR	Gerhardus Pienaar	78.91
6	ASI	Li Rongxiang	78.12
7	OCE	William Hamlyn-Harris	74.48
8	ESP	Gustavo Dacal	68.26
9	USA	Chris Clever	65.73

==== Women ====
Pos.	Team	Competitor	Result
1	AME	Osleidys Menéndez	64.41
2	RUS	Tatyana Shikolenko	60.11
3	EUR	Mikaela Ingberg	60.08
4	GER	Steffi Nerius	57.81
5	USA	Serene Ross	56.91
6	ASI	Ma Ning	56.60
7	ESP	Marta Míguez	55.97
8	AFR	Aïda Sellam	52.48
9	OCE	Cecilia McIntosh	52.35
