= 2003 European Athletics Indoor Cup =

Sporting event in Leipzig, Germany

- Host city: Leipzig, Germany
- Events: 19
- Dates: 15 February
- Main venue: Arena Leipzig

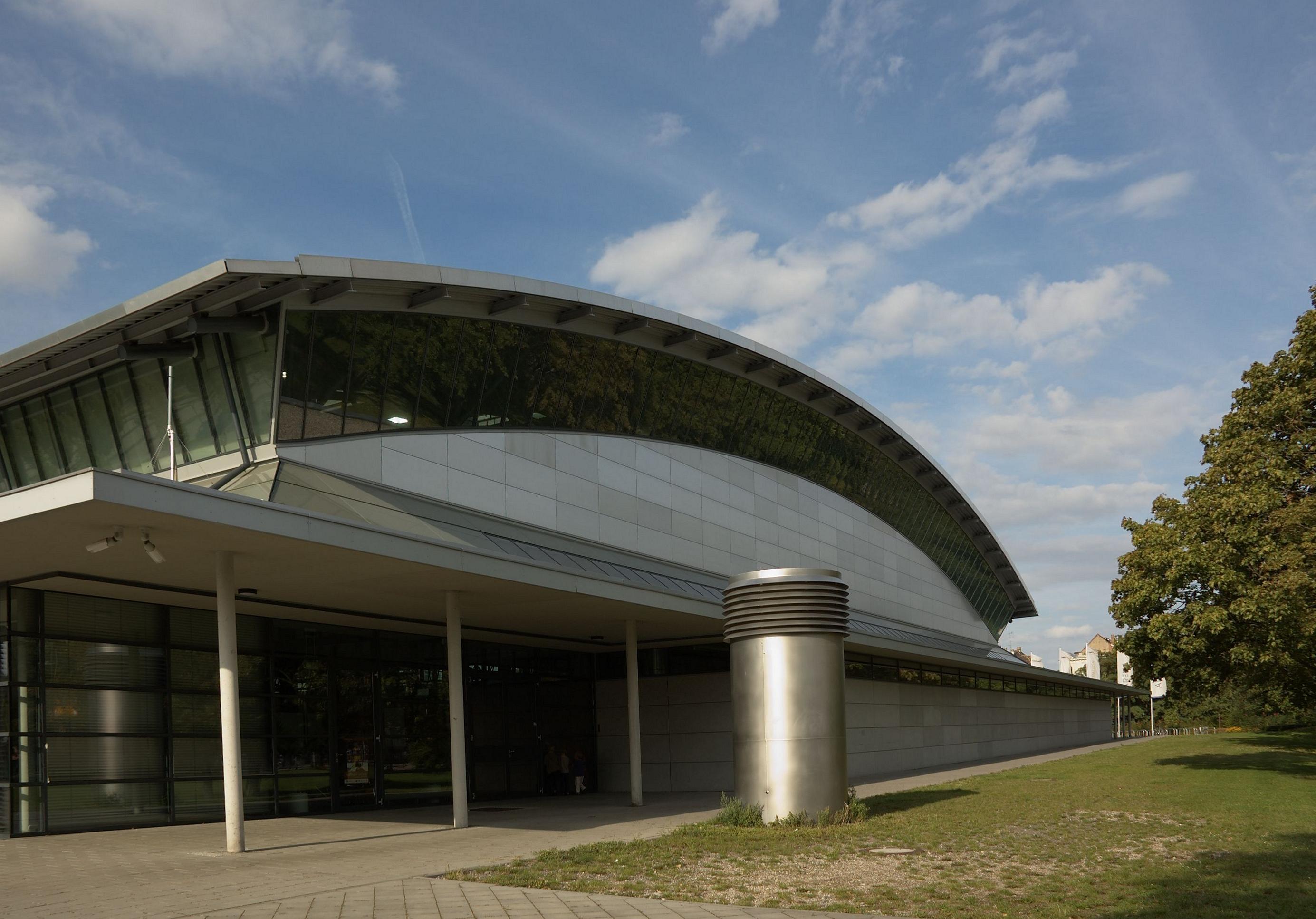
The host stadium for the event in Leipzig

The 2003 European Athletics Indoor Cup was held on 15 February 2003 at the Arena Leipzig in Leipzig, Germany. It was the inaugural edition of the indoor track and field meeting for international teams, which featured the eight top performing nations from the 2002 European Cup. The event was held before a sell-out crowd of 3069 people and athletes gave a positive reaction to the competition, with 60 metres winner Jason Gardener remarking that "The public, the organisation and the facilities are very good here". This reception led to Leipzig being awarded the hosting rights to the 2004 European Athletics Indoor Cup by the European Athletic Association. Spain won the men's section of the team competition, while Russia took the top women's honours.

The competition comprised nineteen athletics events, ten for men and nine for women. The 400 metres races and medley relays were held in a dual final format, with finishing times determining the ultimate final rankings. The international team points totals were decided by their athletes' finishing positions, with each representative's performance contributing towards their national overall score.

== Results summary ==
=== Men ===
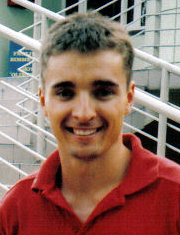
The reigning European Indoor champion Marek Plawgo won the 400 m.

Event	Gold		Silver		Bronze	
60 metres	Jason Gardener (GBR)	6.55	Aristotelis Gavelas (GRE)	6.61	Andrey Yepishin (RUS)	6.70
400 metres	Marek Plawgo (POL)	46.76	David Canal (ESP)	46.93	Jamie Baulch (GBR)	46.99
800 metres	René Herms (GER)	1:48.65	Dmitriy Bogdanov (RUS)	1:49.30	Nicolas Aïssat (FRA)	1:49.43
1500 metres	Juan Carlos Higuero (ESP)	3:41.64	Saïd Chébili (FRA)	3:42.27	Zbigniew Graczyk (POL)	3:42.55
3000 metres	Yousef El Nasri (ESP)	8:00.28	Jan Fitschen (GER)	8:00.59	Lorenzo Perrone (ITA)	8:01.15
60 metres hurdles	Mike Fenner (GER)	7.68	Andrea Giaconi (ITA)	7.74	Ladji Doucouré (FRA)	7.77
2000 m medley relay (200/400/600/800 m)	France (FRA); Leslie Djhone; Cédric Felip; Jimmy Lomba; Florent Lacasse	4:14.42	Poland (POL); Marcin Urbaś; Piotr Rysiukiewicz; Artur Gąsiewski; Grzegorz Krzosek	4:15.18	Great Britain (GBR); Julian Golding; Matthew Elias; Jared Deacon; Chris Moss	4:16.38
High jump	Alessandro Talotti (ITA)	2.28 m	Yaroslav Rybakov (RUS)	2.26 m	Roman Fricke (GER)	2.24 m
Long jump	Yago Lamela (ESP)	8.09 m	Ruslan Gataullin (RUS)	7.97 m	Chris Tomlinson (GBR)	7.97 m
Shot put	Ralf Bartels (GER)	19.69 m	Manuel Martínez (ESP)	19.60 m	Ivan Yushkov (RUS)	19.58 m

=== Women ===
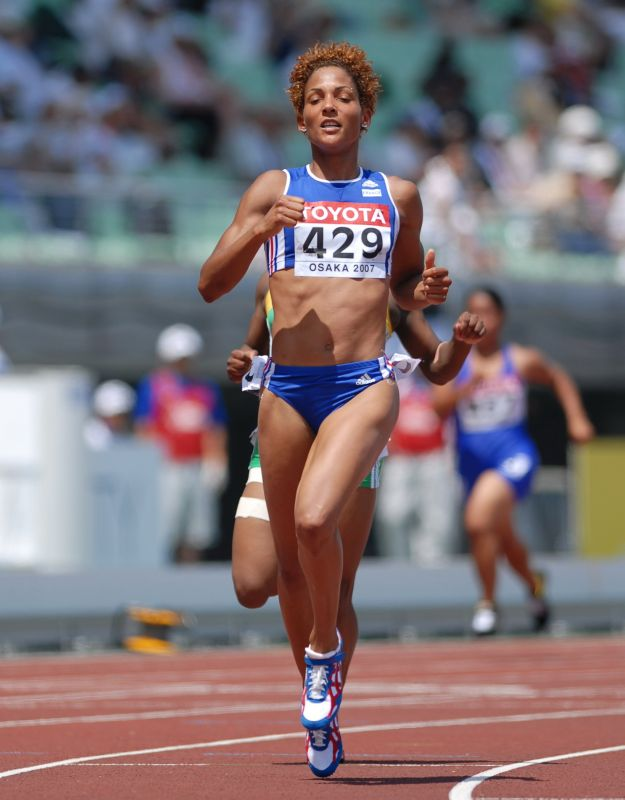
Christine Arron of France won the women's 60 metres.

Event	Gold		Silver		Bronze	
60 metres	Christine Arron (FRA)	7.18	Marina Kislova (RUS)	7.24	Esther Möller (GER)	7.30
400 metres	Grit Breuer (GER)	51.91	Catherine Murphy (GBR)	52.63	Natalya Antyukh (RUS)	52.66
800 metres	Mayte Martínez (ESP)	2:03.14	Jo Fenn (GBR)	2:03.70	Anna Jakubczak (POL)	2:04.03
1500 metres	Hayley Tullett (GBR)	4:08.63	Yuliya Kosenkova (RUS)	4:09.10	Lidia Chojecka (POL)	4:10.79
3000 metres	Galina Bogomolova (RUS)	8:55.41	Sabrina Mockenhaupt (GER)	8:56.33	Wioletta Janowska (POL)	9:00.77
60 metres hurdles	Glory Alozie (ESP)	7.94	Linda Ferga (FRA)	8.06	Flora Rentoumi (GRE)	8.17
2000 m medley relay (200/400/600/800 m)	Russia (RUS); Yuliya Tabakova; Svetlana Goncharenko; Svetlana Khrushcheleva; Svetlana Klyuka	4:41.69	Germany (GER); Gabi Rockmeier; Claudia Marx; Ulrike Urbansky; Anja Knippel	4:49.40	Romania (ROM); Eveline Lisenco; Maria Rus; Alina Rîpanu; Elena Iagăr	4:52.62
Pole vault	Svetlana Feofanova (RUS)	4.65 m	Annika Becker (GER)	4.50 m	Monika Pyrek (POL)	4.30 m
Triple jump	Adelina Gavrilă (ROM)	14.23 m	Olga Vasdeki (GRE)	14.07 m	Carlota Castrejana (ESP)	14.01 m

== Medal table ==
Key

The host country is highlighted in lavender blue

Men
Rank	Nation	Points total	Gold	Silver	Bronze	Medal total
1	Spain	56	3	2	0	5
2	Germany	56	3	1	1	5
3	France	49	1	1	2	4
4	Russia	49	0	3	2	5
5	Italy	47	1	1	1	3
6	Poland	46	1	1	1	3
7	Great Britain	39	1	0	3	4
8	Greece	24	0	1	0	1
Total			10	10	10	30

Women
Rank	Nation	Points total	Gold	Silver	Bronze	Medal total
1	Russia	60	3	2	1	6
2	Germany	49	1	3	1	5
3	Great Britain	40	1	2	0	3
4	France	40	1	1	0	2
5	Poland	40	0	0	4	4
6	Spain	37	2	0	1	3
7	Greece	32	0	1	1	2
8	Romania	31	1	0	1	2
Total			9	9	9	27

== See also ==
- 2003 European Cup (athletics)
