= Athletics at the 2002 Commonwealth Games – Men's 400 metres =

Men's 400 metres at the 2002 Commonwealth Games
- Venue: City of Manchester Stadium
- Dates: 26 July 2002 (heats); 26 July 2002 (quarter finals); 27 July 2002 (semi finals); 28 July 2002 (final)
- Competitors: 48 from 26 nations
- Winning time: 45.07

Medalists
gold medal	Michael Blackwood	Jamaica
silver medal	Shane Niemi	Canada
bronze medal	Avard Moncur	Bahamas

Official Video

The men's 400 metres event at the 2002 Commonwealth Games took place between 26 and 28 July at the City of Manchester Stadium in Manchester, England. Michael Blackwood won the gold medal with a time of 45.07 seconds giving Jamaica its second victory in the event after Bert Cameron claimed the title in 1982. Canadian Shane Niemi placed second, taking the silver medal in 45.09. He finished ahead of world champion Avard Moncur of the Bahamas who won the bronze.

This was the ninth running of the 400 metres event at the Commonwealth Games after converting to metric at the 1970 Edinburgh Games. A 440 yard event was contested between 1930 and 1966. 48 competitors from 26 nations entered the event. The 1999 world indoor champion Jamie Baulch withdrew from the event as he had failed to recover from a hamstring injury. His Welsh team mate and defending champion Iwan Thomas also chose not to contest the event. However, both men were part of the quartet who won silver the 4 × 400 metres relay held later in the meet. Mark Richardson, the silver medallist from Kuala Lumpur, withdrew from the Games in June due to an achilles injury. Sri Lankan Sugath Thilakaratne, who won the bronze four year prior, narrowly missed reaching the final, finishing sixth in the second semi final. The other notable absentee was Greg Haughton, the Olympic and world bronze medallist who missed the Games over a dispute with the Jamaica Athletics Administrative Association.

== Records ==
Prior to this competition, the existing records were as follows:

Records before the 2002 Commonwealth Games
Record	Time (s)	Athlete (nation)	Meet	Location	Date	Ref
World record	43.18	Michael Johnson (USA)	World Championships	Seville, Spain	29 August 1996	
Commonwealth record	44.17	Innocent Egbunike (NGR)	Weltklasse Zürich	Zurich, Switzerland	19 August 1987	
Games record	44.52	Iwan Thomas (WAL)	Commonwealth Games	Kuala Lumpur, Malaysia	18 September 1998	

== Results ==
=== Heats ===
The heats were held on 26 July, starting at 13:26 in the afternoon.

Qualification Rules: First 4 in each heat (Q) and the best 4 of remaining athletes (q) advance to the quarter finals.

==== Heat 1 ====
Results of heat 1
Rank	Athlete	Nation	Time	Notes
1	Avard Moncur	Bahamas	45.72	Q
2	Marcus la Grange	South Africa	45.95	Q
3	Sean Baldock	England	46.02	Q
4	Clinton Hill	Australia	46.11	Q
5	Fidelis Gadzama	Nigeria	46.37	q, SB
6	Quincy Anthony	Antigua and Barbuda	46.76	q
	Nabi Wallace	Dominica	DQ	

==== Heat 2 ====
Results of heat 2
Rank	Athlete	Nation	Time	Notes
1	Alleyne Francique	Grenada	46.36	Q
2	Jared Deacon	England	46.52	Q
3	Wilan Louis	Barbados	46.69	Q
4	Enefiok Udo-Obong	Nigeria	46.77	Q
5	Lulu Basinyi	Botswana	47.62	q
6	Micha Charles	Dominica	50.44	
7	Reonardo Harvey	Turks and Caicos Islands	50.76	NR

==== Heat 3 ====
Results of heat 3
Rank	Athlete	Nation	Time	Notes
1	Michael Blackwood	Jamaica	46.68	Q
2	Sugath Thilakaratne	Sri Lanka	46.80	Q
3	Tim Benjamin	Wales	46.89	Q
4	Paul McKee	Northern Ireland	47.02	Q
5	Lupo Kumitau	Niue	59.38	
	Timothy Munnings	Bahamas	DQ	
	Musa Audu	Nigeria	DQ	

==== Heat 4 ====
Results of heat 4
Rank	Athlete	Nation	Time	Notes
1	Chris Brown	Bahamas	46.39	Q
2	Pete Coley	Jamaica	46.45	Q
3	Damian Barry	Trinidad and Tobago	46.59	Q
4	Chris Lloyd	Dominica	46.90	Q
5	Sahr Thomas	Sierra Leone	48.36	q, SB
6	Kevin Arthurton	Saint Kitts and Nevis	48.48	
	Clement Abai	Papua New Guinea	DNS	

==== Heat 5 ====
Results of heat 5
Rank	Athlete	Nation	Time	Notes
1	Daniel Caines	England	47.37	Q
2	Shane Niemi	Canada	47.87	Q
3	Jeffrey Masvanhise	Zimbabwe	48.04	Q
4	Fernando Augustin	Mauritius	48.12	Q
5	Evans Marie	Seychelles	49.01	
6	Jeffrey Bai	Papua New Guinea	50.45	

==== Heat 6 ====
Results of heat 6
Rank	Athlete	Nation	Time	Notes
1	Sanjay Ayre	Jamaica	46.82	Q
2	Johnson Kubisa	Botswana	46.84	Q
3	Young Talkmore Nyongani	Zimbabwe	46.96	Q
4	Simon Pierre	Trinidad and Tobago	47.72	Q
5	Moses Kamut	Vanuatu	49.57	
	John Fuller	Sierra Leone	DQ	
	Jamie Baulch	Wales	DNS	

==== Heat 7 ====
Results of heat 7
Rank	Athlete	Nation	Time	Notes
1	Eric Milazar	Mauritius	47.31	Q
2	Rohan Pradeep Kumara	Sri Lanka	47.70	Q
3	California Molefe	Botswana	48.39	Q
4	Mowen Boino	Papua New Guinea	48.97	Q
	Lewis Banda	Zimbabwe	DQ	
	Frank Turay	Sierra Leone	DNS	
	Sylvester Chishiba	Zambia	DNS	

=== Quarter finals ===
The quarter finals were held on 26 July, starting at 19:12 in the evening.

Qualification: First 4 of each heat qualified directly (Q) for the semi finals.

==== Quarter final 1 ====
Results of quarter final 1
Rank	Athlete	Nation	Time	Notes
1	Eric Milazar	Mauritius	46.02	Q
2	Michael Blackwood	Jamaica	46.07	Q
3	Clinton Hill	Australia	46.28	Q
4	Johnson Kubisa	Botswana	46.70	Q
5	Fidelis Gadzama	Nigeria	47.05	
6	Rohan Pradeep Kumara	Sri Lanka	47.14	
7	Jeffrey Masvanhise	Zimbabwe	47.50	
8	Mowen Boino	Papua New Guinea	48.74	

==== Quarter final 2 ====
Results of quarter final 2
Rank	Athlete	Nation	Time	Notes
1	Shane Niemi	Canada	46.49	Q
2	Sanjay Ayre	Jamaica	46.49	Q
3	Jared Deacon	England	46.66	Q
4	Chris Brown	Bahamas	46.71	Q
5	California Molefe	Botswana	46.74	
6	Young Talkmore Nyongani	Zimbabwe	47.14	
7	Quincy Anthony	Antigua and Barbuda	47.61	
	Simon Pierre	Trinidad and Tobago	DNF	

==== Quarter final 3 ====
Results of quarter final 3
Rank	Athlete	Nation	Time	Notes
1	Avard Moncur	Bahamas	46.11	Q
2	Marcus la Grange	South Africa	46.19	Q
3	Sean Baldock	England	46.26	Q
4	Paul McKee	Northern Ireland	46.47	Q
5	Wilan Louis	Barbados	46.60	
6	Pete Coley	Jamaica	47.03	
7	Chris Lloyd	Dominica	47.91	
8	Sahr Thomas	Sierra Leone	49.60	

==== Quarter final 4 ====
Results of quarter final 4
Rank	Athlete	Nation	Time	Notes
1	Alleyne Francique	Grenada	45.93	Q
2	Daniel Caines	England	46.11	Q
3	Sugath Thilakaratne	Sri Lanka	46.48	Q
4	Tim Benjamin	Wales	46.54	Q
5	Fernando Augustin	Mauritius	47.06	
6	Lulu Basinyi	Botswana	47.93	
	Damian Barry	Trinidad and Tobago	DNF	
	Enefiok Udo-Obong	Nigeria	DNF	

=== Semi finals ===
The semi finals were held on 27 July, starting at 20:04 in the evening.

Qualification: First 4 of each heat qualified directly (Q) for the final.

==== Semi final 1 ====
Results of semi final 1
Rank	Athlete	Nation	Time	Notes
1	Alleyne Francique	Grenada	45.06	Q
2	Shane Niemi	Canada	45.08	Q, SB
3	Chris Brown	Bahamas	45.11	Q, SB
4	Michael Blackwood	Jamaica	45.12	Q
5	Marcus la Grange	South Africa	45.51	
6	Sean Baldock	England	45.71	SB
7	Paul McKee	Northern Ireland	45.91	
8	Jared Deacon	England	46.07	

==== Semi final 2 ====
Results of semi final 2
Rank	Athlete	Nation	Time	Notes
1	Daniel Caines	England	44.98	Q, PB
2	Eric Milazar	Mauritius	45.04	Q, SB
3	Avard Moncur	Bahamas	45.30	Q
4	Clinton Hill	Australia	45.41	Q, PB
5	Sanjay Ayre	Jamaica	45.43	
6	Sugath Thilakaratne	Sri Lanka	45.79	
7	Tim Benjamin	Wales	45.89	
8	Johnson Kubisa	Botswana	46.28	

=== Final ===
The final was held at 21:00 on 28 July.

Results of the final
Rank	Athlete	Nation	Time	Notes
1st place, gold medalist(s)	Michael Blackwood	Jamaica	45.07	
2nd place, silver medalist(s)	Shane Niemi	Canada	45.09	
3rd place, bronze medalist(s)	Avard Moncur	Bahamas	45.12	
4	Daniel Caines	England	45.13	
5	Alleyne Francique	Grenada	45.47	
6	Eric Milazar	Mauritius	45.64	
7	Chris Brown	Bahamas	45.67	
8	Clinton Hill	Australia	46.00	
