= 2002 European Athletics Championships – Men's 400 metres =

Men's 400 metres at the European Athletics Championships

The men's 400 metres at the 2002 European Athletics Championships were held at the Olympic Stadium on August 6–8.

== Medalists ==
Gold	Silver	Bronze
Ingo Schultz; Germany	David Canal; Spain	Daniel Caines; Great Britain

== Results ==
=== Heats ===
Qualification: First 3 of each heat (Q) and the next 4 fastest (q) qualified for the semifinals.

Rank	Heat	Name	Nationality	Time	Notes
1	1	Marc Raquil	France	45.70	Q
2	1	David Canal	Spain	45.75	Q
3	2	Ingo Schultz	Germany	45.79	Q
4	3	Marek Plawgo	Poland	45.97	Q
5	2	Paul McKee	Ireland	46.03	Q
5	4	Karel Bláha	Czech Republic	46.03	Q
7	4	Daniel Caines	Great Britain	46.06	Q
8	2	Tim Benjamin	Great Britain	46.15	Q
9	1	Bastian Swillims	Germany	46.20	Q, PB
10	3	Cédric Van Branteghem	Belgium	46.23	Q
10	4	Zsolt Szeglet	Hungary	46.23	Q
12	1	Radek Zachoval	Czech Republic	46.25	q, PB
13	1	Yuriy Borzakovskiy	Russia	46.28	q
14	4	Piotr Rysiukiewicz	Poland	46.44	q
15	2	Stilianos Dimotsios	Greece	46.46	q
16	1	Alessandro Attene	Italy	46.54	
16	3	Andrey Semyonov	Russia	46.54	Q
16	4	Ioan Vieru	Romania	46.54	
19	3	Sean Baldock	Great Britain	46.62	
20	2	Christian Birk	Denmark	46.64	
21	3	Robert Daly	Ireland	46.67	
22	4	Marco Salvucci	Italy	46.70	
23	3	Dmitrijs Miļkevičs	Latvia	46.87	
24	4	Anastasios Goussis	Greece	46.94	
25	2	Matija Šestak	Slovenia	46.97	
26	2	Yevgeniy Lebedev	Russia	47.08	
27	3	Andrea Barberi	Italy	47.14	
28	1	David McCarthy	Ireland	47.30	
29	1	Viktors Lācis	Latvia	47.40	SB

=== Semifinals ===
Qualification: First 4 of each semifinal (Q) qualified directly for the final.

Rank	Heat	Name	Nationality	Time	Notes
1	1	Daniel Caines	Great Britain	45.35	Q
2	1	Ingo Schultz	Germany	45.49	Q
3	1	Marek Plawgo	Poland	45.83	Q
4	1	Zsolt Szeglet	Hungary	45.84	Q
5	2	David Canal	Spain	45.86	Q
6	1	Paul Mckee	Ireland	45.92	
7	2	Cédric Van Branteghem	Belgium	45.94	Q, PB
8	1	Stilianos Dimotsios	Greece	45.98	
9	1	Yuriy Borzakovskiy	Russia	46.04	
10	2	Tim Benjamin	Great Britain	46.07	Q
11	2	Karel Bláha	Czech Republic	46.15	Q
12	2	Piotr Rysiukiewicz	Poland	46.15	
13	2	Bastian Swillims	Germany	46.19	
14	1	Radek Zachoval	Czech Republic	46.24	
15	2	Andrey Semyonov	Russia	46.51	
	2	Marc Raquil	France	DNF	

=== Final ===
Rank	Name	Nationality	Time	Notes
1st place, gold medalist(s)	Ingo Schultz	Germany	45.14	
2nd place, silver medalist(s)	David Canal	Spain	45.24	SB
3rd place, bronze medalist(s)	Daniel Caines	Great Britain	45.28	
4	Marek Plawgo	Poland	45.40	
5	Zsolt Szeglet	Hungary	45.74	
6	Cédric Van Branteghem	Belgium	45.95	
7	Karel Bláha	Czech Republic	46.21	
	Timothy Benjamin	Great Britain	DNS	
