= 2002 European Athletics Championships – Men's 4 × 400 metres relay =

Men's 4 × 400 relay for the European Athletics Championships 2002

Men's 4 × 400 metres relay at the European Athletics Championships

The men's 4 × 400 metres relay at the 2002 European Athletics Championships were held at the Olympic Stadium on August 10–11.

== Medalists ==
Gold	Silver	Bronze
Great Britain; Jared Deacon; Matthew Elias; Jamie Baulch; Daniel Caines; Sean Baldock	Russia; Oleg Mishukov; Andrey Semyonov; Ruslan Mashchenko; Yuriy Borzakovskiy; Yevgeniy Lebedev	France; Leslie Djhone; Ahmed Douhou; Naman Keïta; Ibrahima Wade

== Results ==
=== Heats ===
Qualification: First 3 of each heat (Q) and the next 2 fastest (q) qualified for the final.

Rank	Heat	Nation	Athlete	Time	Notes
1	1	Great Britain	Jared Deacon, Sean Baldock, Jamie Baulch, Matthew Elias	3:02.97	Q
2	1	Poland	Marcin Marciniszyn, Artur Gąsiewski, Piotr Rysiukiewicz, Robert Maćkowiak	3:03.11	Q
3	1	Russia	Oleg Mishukov, Yuriy Borzakovskiy, Yevgeniy Lebedev, Andrey Semyonov	3:03.11	Q
4	2	Germany	Bastian Swillims, Jens Dautzenberg, Lars Figura, Ingo Schultz	3:03.55	Q
5	1	Ireland	Robert Daly, Paul McKee, Antoine Burke, David McCarthy	3:03.73	q, NR
6	2	France	Leslie Djhone, Ahmed Douhou, Ibrahima Wade, Naman Keïta	3:03.77	Q
7	2	Greece	Stilianos Dimotsios, Anastasios Gousis, Georgios Ikonomidis, Periklis Iakovakis	3:04.31	Q
8	1	Czech Republic	Jiří Vojtík, Radek Zachoval, Jan Mazanec, Karel Bláha	3:04.35	q
9	2	Spain	César Martínez, Salvador Rodríguez, Alberto Martínez, David Canal	3:05.28	
	2	Latvia	Inguns Sviklinš, Viktors Lacis, Girts Lamba, Dmitrijs Miļkevičs	DQ	

=== Final ===
Rank	Nation	Athletes	Time	Notes
1st place, gold medalist(s)	Great Britain	Jared Deacon, Matthew Elias, Jamie Baulch, Daniel Caines	3:01.25	
2nd place, silver medalist(s)	Russia	Oleg Mishukov, Andrey Semyonov, Ruslan Mashchenko, Yuriy Borzakovskiy	3:01.34	
3rd place, bronze medalist(s)	France	Leslie Djhone, Ahmed Douhou, Naman Keïta, Ibrahima Wade	3:02.76	
4	Czech Republic	Štěpán Tesařík, Radek Zachoval, Jiří Mužík, Karel Bláha	3:03.82	
5	Ireland	Robert Daly, Paul McKee, Antoine Burke, David McCarthy	3:04.13	
6	Greece	Stilianos Dimotsios, Anastasios Gousis, Georgios Ikonomidis, Periklis Iakovakis	3:04.26	
7	Germany	Ingo Schultz, Jens Dautzenberg, Lars Figura, Bastian Swillims	3:08.56	
	Poland	Marcin Marciniszyn, Marek Plawgo, Piotr Rysiukiewicz, Robert Maćkowiak	DQ	
