= 2006 European Athletics Championships – Men's 400 metres =

Men's 400 metres at the 2006 European Athletics Championships
- Venue: Ullevi Stadium
- Location: Gothenburg, Sweden
- Dates: 7 August (heats); 8 August (semi-finals); 9 August (final)
- Competitors: 33 from 19 nations
- Winning time: 45.02

Medalists
gold medal	Marc Raquil	France
silver medal	Vladislav Frolov	Russia
bronze medal	Leslie Djhone	France

The men's 400 metres at the 2006 European Athletics Championships were held at the Ullevi on August 7, 8 and August 9. Raquil proved the stronger in the final sprint, taking over the race in the final 50 metres.

== Medalists ==
Gold	Silver	Bronze
Marc Raquil; France	Vladislav Frolov; Russia	Leslie Djhone; France

== Schedule ==
Date	Time	Round
August 7, 2006	12:15	Round 1
August 8, 2006	18:55	Semifinals
August 9, 2006	20:45	Final

== Results ==
KEY:	q	Fastest non-qualifiers	Q	Qualified	NR	National record	PB	Personal best	SB	Seasonal best

=== Round 1 ===
Qualification: First 3 in each heat (Q) and the next 4 fastest (q) advance to the semifinals.

Rank	Heat	Name	Nationality	Time	Notes
1	1	Daniel Dąbrowski	Poland	45.58	Q
2	4	Marc Raquil	France	45.65	Q
3	1	Leslie Djhone	France	45.67	Q
4	3	Vladislav Frolov	Russia	45.73	Q
5	3	Andrea Barberi	Italy	45.81	Q, SB
5	4	Dimitrios Regas	Greece	45.81	Q, PB
7	3	Cédric Van Branteghem	Belgium	45.95	Q
8	4	Graham Hedman	United Kingdom	46.02	Q
9	3	Rafał Wieruszewski	Poland	46.05	q
10	2	Timothy Benjamin	United Kingdom	46.10	Q
11	3	Robert Tobin	United Kingdom	46.10	q
11	4	Ioan Vieru	Romania	46.10	q
13	2	David Gillick	Ireland	46.16	Q
14	1	Claudio Licciardello	Italy	46.24	Q
15	4	Marcin Marciniszyn	Poland	46.36	q
16	1	Željko Vincek	Croatia	46.48	
17	1	Paul McKee	Ireland	46.48	
18	4	David McCarthy	Ireland	46.53	SB
19	2	Kamghe Gaba	Germany	46.55	Q
19	4	Sebastian Gatzka	Germany	46.55	
21	3	Karel Bláha	Czech Republic	46.60	
22	1	Dimitrios Gravalos	Greece	46.68	
23	2	Pierre Lavanchy	Switzerland	46.71	
24	2	Thomas Nikitin	Sweden	46.72	PB
25	1	Vasile Bobos	Romania	46.77	
26	3	Brice Panel	France	46.98	
27	3	Youssef El Rhalfioui	Netherlands	47.12	
28	2	Catalin Cîmpeanu	Romania	47.16	
29	2	Padeleimon Melahrinoudis	Greece	47.22	
30	4	David Testa	Spain	47.29	
31	2	Peter Žňava	Slovakia	47.38	
32	1	Ivano Bucci	San Marino	48.86	PB
33	1	Florent Battistel	Monaco	50.75	

=== Semifinals ===
First 4 of each Semifinal will be directly qualified (Q) for the Final.

==== Semifinal 1 ====
Rank	Lane	Name	Nationality	React	Time	Notes
1	3	Marc Raquil	France	0.228	44.95	Q, SB
2	5	Vladislav Frolov	Russia	0.186	45.21	Q, PB
3	4	Andrea Barberi	Italy	0.221	45.30	Q, PB
4	6	Dimitrios Regas	Greece	0.166	45.60	Q, PB
5	8	Ioan Vieru	Romania	0.185	45.83	
6	2	Graham Hedman	United Kingdom	0.183	45.90	
7	1	Marcin Marciniszyn	Poland	0.156	45.96	
8	7	Claudio Licciardello	Italy	0.169	46.21	

==== Semifinal 2 ====
Rank	Lane	Name	Nationality	React	Time	Notes
1	6	Leslie Djhone	France	0.190	45.23	Q
2	3	Daniel Dąbrowski	Poland	0.294	45.38	Q, PB
3	7	Rafał Wieruszewski	Poland	0.211	45.56	Q, PB
4	4	Timothy Benjamin	United Kingdom	0.225	45.67	Q
5	8	Kamghe Gaba	Germany	0.168	45.77	
6	1	Robert Tobin	United Kingdom	0.227	46.03	
7	5	David Gillick	Ireland	0.148	46.84	
	2	Cédric Van Branteghem	Belgium	0.236		DNF

=== Final ===
Rank	Lane	Name	Nationality	React	Time	Notes
1st place, gold medalist(s)	5	Marc Raquil	France	0.217	45.02	
2nd place, silver medalist(s)	6	Vladislav Frolov	Russia	0.193	45.09	PB
3rd place, bronze medalist(s)	3	Leslie Djhone	France	0.156	45.40	
4	4	Daniel Dąbrowski	Poland	0.177	45.56	
5	7	Andrea Barberi	Italy	0.235	45.70	
6	1	Timothy Benjamin	United Kingdom	0.210	45.89	
7	2	Rafał Wieruszewski	Poland	0.259	45.97	
8	8	Dimitrios Regas	Greece	0.176	46.23	
