= 2003 IAAF World Indoor Championships – Men's 400 metres =

The men's 400 metres event at the 2003 IAAF World Indoor Championships was held on March 14–16.

== Medalists ==
Gold	Silver	Bronze
Tyree Washington United States	Daniel Caines Great Britain	Paul McKee Ireland; Jamie Baulch Great Britain

== Results ==
=== Heats ===
First 2 of each heat (Q) and next 4 fastest (q) qualified for the semifinals.

Rank	Heat	Name	Nationality	Time	Notes
1	1	Daniel Caines	Great Britain	45.85	Q
2	1	Tyree Washington	United States	45.90	Q, PB
3	4	Daniel Batman	Australia	46.11	Q
4	1	Marek Plawgo	Poland	46.33	q
5	2	David Canal	Spain	46.39	Q
6	3	Jamie Baulch	Great Britain	46.44	Q
7	1	Sofiane Labidi	Tunisia	46.47	q, NR
8	2	Paul McKee	Ireland	46.68	Q
9	3	David McCarthy	Ireland	46.69	Q
10	3	Chris Brown	Bahamas	46.74	q
11	3	Cedric van Branteghem	Belgium	46.75	q
12	4	Ioan Lucian Vieru	Romania	46.84	Q
13	4	Damion Barry	Trinidad and Tobago	47.21	
14	2	Edoardo Vallet	Italy	47.77	
15	2	California Molefe	Botswana	47.90	NR
16	4	Dmitriy Chumichkin	Azerbaijan	48.11	
17	2	Ernie Candelario	Philippines	48.86	
18	3	Román Basil	Panama	49.46	
	1	Rohan Pradeep Kumara	Sri Lanka	DQ	
	2	Davian Clarke	Jamaica	DQ	
	3	Moses Kondowe	Malawi	DQ	
	4	Corey Nelson	United States	DQ	
	4	Alleyne Francique	Grenada	DQ	
	1	Danny McFarlane	Jamaica	DNF	

=== Semifinals ===
First 2 of each semifinal (Q) qualified directly for the final.

Rank	Heat	Name	Nationality	Time	Notes
1	1	Paul McKee	Ireland	46.24	Q, NR
1	2	Daniel Caines	Great Britain	46.24	Q
3	2	Tyree Washington	United States	46.50	Q
4	2	David McCarthy	Ireland	46.61	Q, PB
5	1	Jamie Baulch	Great Britain	46.74	Q
6	1	Daniel Batman	Australia	46.76	Q
7	2	Marek Plawgo	Poland	46.82	
8	1	Ioan Lucian Vieru	Romania	47.01	
8	2	Cedric van Branteghem	Belgium	47.01	
10	1	Chris Brown	Bahamas	47.03	
11	1	Sofiane Labidi	Tunisia	47.14	
12	2	David Canal	Spain	47.17	

=== Final ===
Rank	Name	Nationality	Time	Notes
1st place, gold medalist(s)	Tyree Washington	United States	45.34	WL
2nd place, silver medalist(s)	Daniel Caines	Great Britain	45.43	PB
3rd place, bronze medalist(s)	Paul McKee	Ireland	45.99	NR
3rd place, bronze medalist(s)	Jamie Baulch	Great Britain	45.99	SB
5	David McCarthy	Ireland	46.61	PB
6	Daniel Batman	Australia	46.67	
