= 2003 IAAF World Indoor Championships – Men's 4 × 400 metres relay =

The men's 4 × 400 metres relay event at the 2003 IAAF World Indoor Championships was held on March 15–16.

== Medalists ==
Gold	Silver	Bronze
Jamaica; Leroy Colquhoun; Danny McFarlane; Michael Blackwood; Davian Clarke; Kemel Thompson*	Great Britain; Jamie Baulch; Timothy Benjamin; Cori Henry; Daniel Caines; Mark Hylton*; Jared Deacon*	Poland; Rafał Wieruszewski; Grzegorz Zajączkowski; Marcin Marciniszyn; Marek Plawgo; Artur Gąsiewski*; Piotr Rysiukiewicz*

* Runners who participated in the heats only and received medals.

Note: The United States (James Davis, Jerome Young, Milton Campbell, Tyree Washington) originally won the gold medal in 3:04.09, but were disqualified after Young admitted to the use of banned substances in 2004.

== Results ==
=== Heats ===
Qualification: First 2 teams of each heat (Q) plus the next 2 fastest (q) advance to the final.

Rank	Heat	Nation	Athletes	Time	Notes
DQ	1	United States	James Davis, Derrick Brew, Milton Campbell, Jerome Young	~~3:04.17~~	Q, Doping
1	1	Jamaica	Leroy Colquhoun, Danny McFarlane, Kemel Thompson, Michael Blackwood	3:06.46	Q
2	1	Great Britain	Mark Hylton, Jared Deacon, Timothy Benjamin, Cori Henry	3:06.60	q, SB
3	2	Russia	Oleg Mishukov, Dmitriy Golovastov, Andrey Rudnitskiy, Aleksandr Usov	3:08.71	Q
4	2	Poland	Rafał Wieruszewski, Artur Gąsiewski, Marcin Marciniszyn, Piotr Rysiukiewicz	3:16.10	Q
	2	Spain	Salvador Rodríguez, Daniel Ruiz, Alberto Martínez, Artzai Morante	DQ	
	2	Bahamas	Troy McIntosh, Avard Moncur, Carl Oliver, Timothy Munnings	DQ	
	1	Ireland	Paul Brizzel, Gary Ryan, Paul McKee, David McCarthy	DNS	

=== Final ===
Rank	Nation	Competitors	Time	Notes
DQ	United States	James Davis, Jerome Young, Milton Campbell, Tyree Washington	~~3:04.09~~	Doping
1st place, gold medalist(s)	Jamaica	Leroy Colquhoun, Danny McFarlane, Michael Blackwood, Davian Clarke	3:04.21	NR
2nd place, silver medalist(s)	Great Britain	Jamie Baulch, Timothy Benjamin, Cori Henry, Daniel Caines	3:06.12	SB
3rd place, bronze medalist(s)	Poland	Rafał Wieruszewski, Grzegorz Zajączkowski, Marcin Marciniszyn, Marek Plawgo	3:06.61	SB
	Russia	Oleg Mishukov, Aleksandr Usov, Andrey Rudnitskiy, Dmitriy Bogdanov	DQ	
