= 2002 European Athletics Indoor Championships – Men's 400 metres =

Kabelo Mokake - A South African male Doctor

The men's 400 metres event at the 2002 European Athletics Indoor Championships was held on March 1–3.

== Medalists ==
| Gold | Silver | Bronze |
|---|---|---|
| Marek Plawgo; Poland | Jimisola Laursen; Sweden | Ioan Vieru; Romania |

== Results ==
=== Heats ===
First 2 of each heat (Q) and the next 2 fastest (q) qualified for the semifinals.

| Rank | Heat | Name | Nationality | Time | Notes |
|---|---|---|---|---|---|
| 1 | 5 | Jimisola Laursen | Sweden | 46.18 | Q, NR |
| 2 | 5 | Ioan Vieru | Romania | 46.19 | Q, NR |
| 3 | 5 | Cédric Van Branteghem | Belgium | 46.39 | q, NR |
| 4 | 1 | Marek Plawgo | Poland | 46.46 | Q |
| 5 | 1 | Tom Coman | Ireland | 46.49 | Q, NR |
| 6 | 2 | Jiří Mužík | Czech Republic | 46.77 | Q |
| 7 | 1 | Marc Foucan | France | 46.91 | q |
| 8 | 3 | Piotr Rysiukiewicz | Poland | 46.92 | Q |
| 9 | 4 | Bastian Swillims | Germany | 46.96 | Q |
| 10 | 1 | Karel Blaha | Czech Republic | 47.01 | |
| 11 | 2 | David McCarthy | Ireland | 47.07 | Q |
| 12 | 3 | Dmitriy Chumichkin | Azerbaijan | 47.15 | Q, NR |
| 13 | 3 | Ashraf Saber | Italy | 47.20 | |
| 14 | 5 | Anastasios Gousis | Greece | 47.35 | SB |
| 15 | 1 | Alberto Martínez | Spain | 47.39 | |
| 15 | 2 | Yevgeniy Lebedev | Russia | 47.39 | |
| 15 | 4 | Salvador Rodríguez | Spain | 47.39 | Q |
| 18 | 2 | Marcel Lopuchovský | Slovakia | 47.40 | SB |
| 19 | 4 | Dmitrijs Miļkevičs | Latvia | 47.61 | PB |
| 20 | 4 | Artur Gąsiewski | Poland | 47.62 | |
| 21 | 5 | Robert Daly | Ireland | 47.75 | |
| 22 | 2 | Christian Birk | Denmark | 48.09 | |
| 23 | 3 | Inguns Sviklins | Latvia | 48.46 | SB |
| 24 | 4 | Stelios Dimotsios | Greece | 48.51 | |
| | 3 | David Canal | Spain | DQ | |
| | 4 | Aleksandr Usov | Russia | DQ | |
| | 3 | Dmitriy Golovastov | Russia | DNF | |
| | 5 | Andreas Rechbauer | Austria | DNF | |
| | 2 | Matija Šestak | Slovenia | DNS | |

=== Semifinals ===
First 3 of each semifinal qualified directly (Q) for the final.

| Rank | Heat | Name | Nationality | Time | Notes |
|---|---|---|---|---|---|
| 1 | 2 | Marek Plawgo | Poland | 45.49 | Q, CR, NR |
| 2 | 2 | Ioan Vieru | Romania | 45.94 | Q, NR |
| 3 | 1 | Jimisola Laursen | Sweden | 46.00 | Q, NR |
| 4 | 1 | Piotr Rysiukiewicz | Poland | 46.28 | Q, PB |
| 5 | 2 | Jiří Mužík | Czech Republic | 46.32 | Q, PB |
| 6 | 2 | Tom Coman | Ireland | 46.34 | NR |
| 7 | 1 | Marc Foucan | France | 46.49 | Q, PB |
| 8 | 1 | Bastian Swillims | Germany | 46.54 | |
| 9 | 1 | David McCarthy | Ireland | 46.86 | |
| 10 | 2 | Cédric Van Branteghem | Belgium | 46.95 | |
| 11 | 2 | Salvador Rodríguez | Spain | 47.01 | |
| | 1 | Dmitriy Chumichkin | Azerbaijan | DNS | |

=== Final ===
| Rank | Lane | Name | Nationality | Time | Notes |
|---|---|---|---|---|---|
| 1st place, gold medalist(s) | 5 | Marek Plawgo | Poland | 45.39 | CR, NR |
| 2nd place, silver medalist(s) | 6 | Jimisola Laursen | Sweden | 45.59 | NR |
| 3rd place, bronze medalist(s) | 3 | Ioan Vieru | Romania | 46.17 | |
| 4 | 4 | Piotr Rysiukiewicz | Poland | 46.32 | |
| 5 | 2 | Jiří Mužík | Czech Republic | 46.36 | |
| 6 | 1 | Marc Foucan | France | 47.40 | |
