= Sean Baldock =

British sprinter (born 1976)

Personal information
- Nationality: British (English)
- Born: 3 December 1976 (age 49) Hastings, East Sussex, England
- Height: 173 cm (5 ft 8 in)
- Weight: 73 kg (161 lb)

Sport
- Sport: Athletics
- Event: 400m
- Club: Belgrave Harriers
Medal record
Men's athletics
Representing England
Commonwealth Games
Silver medal – second place	1998 Kuala Lumpur	4x400m relay
Gold medal – first place	2002 Manchester	4x400m relay
Representing Great Britain
European Championships
Gold medal – first place	2002 Munich	4x400 m relay
Summer Universiade
Bronze medal – third place	1997 Catania	4x400 m relay

Sean Michael Baldock (born 3 December 1976) is a male British former sprinter who competed in the 2000 Summer Olympics and in the 2004 Summer Olympics.

== Biography ==
He was born in Hastings, East Sussex. He only became a serious athlete in 1996 having joined Hastings Athletic Club as an under-11 athlete in 1987. Prior to that he had played football, eventually playing for Hastings Town. When he reached 18, because he was always getting injured, he was forced to make a choice between football and athletics, world class athlete.

He represented England and won a silver medal in the 4 x 400 metres event, at the 1998 Commonwealth Games in Kuala Lumpur, Malaysia. The other team members consisted of Solomon Wariso, Mark Richardson, Jared Deacon, Paul Slythe and Mark Hylton.

Four years later at the 2002 Commonwealth Games in Manchester he was part of the gold medal-winning team in the 4 x 400 metres relay that consisted of Chris Rawlinson, Cori Henry, Daniel Caines, Hylton and Deacon.

Baldock made the podium of the AAA Championships on three occasions in 2000, 2002 and 2004.

Upon retirement, he became a sports teacher at Claremont School, East Sussex, a lecturer on sports injury at Sussex Coast College and a retained firefighter. More recently, he was a sports coach at Buckswood School East Sussex.

== Competition record ==
Year	Competition	Venue	Position	Event	Notes
Representing Great Britain and England
1997	World Indoor Championships	Paris, France	10th (h)	4x400 m relay	3:14.55
1997	Universiade	Catania, Italy	3rd	4x400 m relay	3:02.74
1998	European Indoor Championships	Valencia, Spain	6th	400 m	50.05
1998	European Championships	Budapest, Hungary	1st (h)	4x400 m relay	3:02.37
1998	World Cup	Johannesburg, South Africa	1st	4x400 m relay	2:59.71
1998	Commonwealth Games	Kuala Lumpur, Malaysia	2nd (h)	4x400 m relay	3:03.58
1999	World Indoor Championships	Maebashi, Japan	3rd (h)	4x400 m relay	3:06.34
2000	Olympic Games	Sydney, Australia	45th (h)	400 m	46.45
2002	Commonwealth Games	Manchester, United Kingdom	11th (sf)	400 m	45.71
2002	Commonwealth Games	Manchester, United Kingdom	1st	4x400 m relay	3:00.40
2002	European Championships	Munich, Germany	19th (h)	400 m	46.62
2002	European Championships	Munich, Germany	1st (h)	4x400 m relay	3:02.97
2003	World Championships	Paris, France	4th	4x400 m relay	3:01.00
2004	Olympic Games	Athens, Greece	5th	4x400 m relay	3:01.07

== Personal Bests ==
Event	Result	Wind	Venue	Date
200 m	21.55	-4.5	Palma de Mallorca, Spain	8 July 1999
200 m	21.43	+3.3	London, UK	5 May 2001
200 m (Indoors)	21.50		Glasgow, UK	14 March 1999
300 m	32.88		Cardiff, UK	31 May 1997
400 m	45.20		Birmingham, UK	12 August 2000
400 m (Indoors)	46.11		Birmingham, UK	8 February 1998
800 m	1:53.08		Birmingham, UK	23 July 1999
800 m (Indoors)	1:54.25		Birmingham, UK	7 February 1998
4x400 m relay	3:01.00		Paris, France	31 August 2003
4x400 m relay (Indoors)	3:06.34		Maebashi, Japan	6 March 1999
