= Cori Henry =

British sprinter (born 1976)

Medal record

Men's athletics

Representing United Kingdom

World Indoor Championships
Silver medal – second place	2003 Birmingham	4x400 m relay

Representing England

Commonwealth Games
Gold medal – first place	2002 Manchester	4x400 m relay

Cori Henry (born 9 December 1976) is a British sprinter who specializes in the 400 meters.

He won a silver medal in the 4 × 400 m relay at the 2003 World Indoor Championships in Barcelona, along with Jamie Baulch, Timothy Benjamin, and Daniel Caines, finishing with a time of 3:06.12. At the 2002 Commonwealth Games, he competed for England in the 4 × 400 m relay; his team won the gold medal. Personal best 100m 10.2 seconds Personal best 200m 20.5 seconds Personal best 400m 45.5 seconds
