= Athletics at the 2002 Commonwealth Games – Men's 4 × 400 metres relay =

Men's 4 × 400 metres relay at the Commonwealth Games

The men's 4 × 400 metres relay event at the 2002 Commonwealth Games was held on July 30–31.

In the final, Michael Blackwood of Jamaica was in the leading position when coming into the final stretch. He, however, dropped his baton when being overtaken by Matthew Elias from Wales and ultimately finished the race in fourth without a baton, which is not allowed. England and Wales fought it out to the finishing line with England coming narrowly on top.

== Medalists ==
Gold	Silver	Bronze
England; Jared Deacon; Sean Baldock; Chris Rawlinson; Daniel Caines; Mark Hylton*; Cori Henry*	Wales; Timothy Benjamin; Iwan Thomas; Jamie Baulch; Matthew Elias	Bahamas; Chris Brown; Troy McIntosh; Dominic Demeritte; Timothy Munnings; Carl Oliver*

* Athletes who competed in heats only and received medals.

== Results ==
=== Heats ===
Qualification: First 3 teams of each heat (Q) plus the next 2 fastest (q) qualified for the final.

Rank	Heat	Nation	Athletes	Time	Notes
1	2	England	Mark Hylton, Cori Henry, Jared Deacon, Sean Baldock	3:04.01	Q
2	2	Wales	Timothy Benjamin, Iwan Thomas, Jamie Baulch, Matthew Elias	3:04.18	Q
3	2	South Africa	Marcus la Grange, Jopie van Oudtshoorn, Leigh Julius, Arnaud Malherbe	3:04.31	Q
4	2	Australia	Patrick Dwyer, Paul Pearce, Kris McCarthy, Clinton Hill	3:04.39	q
5	1	Jamaica	Davian Clarke, Danny McFarlane, Pete Coley, Brandon Simpson	3:04.56	Q
6	1	Bahamas	Timothy Munnings, Troy McIntosh, Carl Oliver, Chris Brown	3:04.73	Q
7	1	Sri Lanka	Rohan Kumara, Ranga Wimalawansa, Prasanna Sampath Amarasekara, Sugath Thilakaratne	3:07.46	Q
8	1	Nigeria	Musa Audu, Bola Gee Lawal, Tony Ogbeta, Fidelis Gadzama	3:07.93	q
9	1	Trinidad and Tobago	Simon Pierre, Julian Raeburn, Sherridan Kirk, Damian Barry	3:08.66	
10	1	Botswana	Johnson Kubisa, Lulu Basinyi, Otukile Lekote, Oganeditse Moseki	3:09.04	
11	2	Dominica	Chris Lloyd, Clive Baron, Nabi Wallace, Micha Charles	3:16.81	
	2	Sierra Leone	Sahr Thomas, Sockleh Sesay, Dauda Manasary, John Fuller	DQ	
	2	Zimbabwe	Jeffrey Masvanhise, Tawanda Chiwira, Lewis Banda, Talkmore Nyongani	DQ	

=== Final ===
Rank	Nation	Athletes	Time	Notes
1st place, gold medalist(s)	England	Jared Deacon, Sean Baldock, Chris Rawlinson, Daniel Caines	3:00.40	
2nd place, silver medalist(s)	Wales	Timothy Benjamin, Iwan Thomas, Jamie Baulch, Matthew Elias	3:00.41	NR
3rd place, bronze medalist(s)	Bahamas	Chris Brown, Troy McIntosh, Dominic Demeritte, Timothy Munnings	3:01.35	
4	South Africa	Marcus la Grange, Jopie van Oudtshoorn, Mbulaeni Mulaudzi, Arnaud Malherbe	3:01.83	
5	Australia	Tim Williams, Paul Pearce, Patrick Dwyer, Clinton Hill	3:02.22	
6	Nigeria	Tony Ogbeta, Bola Gee Lawal, Musa Audu, Fidelis Gadzama	3:11.16	
	Sri Lanka	Prasanna Sampath Amarasekara, Ranga Wimalawansa, Rohan Kumara, Sugath Thilakaratne	DQ	
	Jamaica	Sanjay Ayre, Brandon Simpson, Danny McFarlane, Michael Blackwood	DNF	
