= 2002 European Athletics Indoor Championships – Men's 4 × 400 metres relay =

The men's 4 × 400 metres relay event at the 2002 European Athletics Indoor Championships was held on March 3.

== Results ==
Rank	Lane	Team	Athlete	Time	Notes
1st place, gold medalist(s)	6	Poland	Marek Plawgo; Piotr Rysiukiewicz; Artur Gąsiewski; Robert Maćkowiak	3:05.50	CR
2nd place, silver medalist(s)	3	France	Marc Foucan; Laurent Claudel; Loic Lerouge; Stephane Diagana	3:06.42	
3rd place, bronze medalist(s)	5	Spain	Carlos Meléndez; David Canal; Salvador Rodríguez; Alberto Martínez	3:06.60	NR
4	4	Russia	Aleksandr Usov; Yevgeniy Lebedev; Aleksandr Ladeyshchikov; Oleg Mishukov	3:08.02	
5	2	Austria	Thomas Scheidl; Andreas Rechbauer; Klaus Angerer; Wolfgang Göschl	3:13.81	
