= 2001 IAAF World Indoor Championships – Men's 400 metres =

The men's 400 metres event at the 2001 IAAF World Indoor Championships was held on March 9–11.

== Medalists ==
Gold	Silver	Bronze
Daniel Caines; Great Britain	Milton Campbell; United States	Danny McFarlane; Jamaica

== Results ==
=== Heats ===
The first two of each heat (Q) and the next 2 fastest (q) qualified for the semifinals.

Rank	Heat	Name	Nationality	Time	Notes
1	2	Daniel Caines	Great Britain	46.65	Q
2	1	Mark Hylton	Great Britain	46.79	Q
3	1	Jimisola Laursen	Sweden	46.82	Q, SB
4	2	David Canal	Spain	46.85	Q
5	3	Danny McFarlane	Jamaica	46.90	Q, PB
6	1	Boris Gorban	Russia	46.91	q
6	2	Sunday Bada	Nigeria	46.91	q
8	4	Sofiane Labidi	Tunisia	46.93	Q, NR
9	4	James Davis	United States	47.01	Q
10	4	Andrey Semyonov	Russia	47.01	
11	3	Félix Sánchez	Dominican Republic	47.02	Q
12	5	Milton Campbell	United States	47.09	Q
13	4	Piotr Rysiukiewicz	Poland	47.19	
14	5	Davian Clarke	Jamaica	47.20	Q
15	3	Robert Maćkowiak	Poland	47.24	
16	2	Sanderlei Claro Parrela	Brazil	47.53	
17	4	Alain Rohr	Switzerland	47.62	
18	5	Troy McIntosh	Bahamas	47.66	
19	5	Stilianos Dimotsios	Greece	47.71	
20	2	Shane Niemi	Canada	47.80	
21	3	Rohan Pradeep Kumara	Sri Lanka	48.02	
22	3	Jude Monye	Nigeria	48.05	
23	3	Jun Osakada	Japan	48.13	
24	1	Carlos Silva	Portugal	48.45	
25	5	Dmitriy Chumichkin	Azerbaijan	48.52	
26	1	Sugath Tillakeratne	Sri Lanka	48.82	
27	1	Marcelo Figueroa	El Salvador	49.35	
28	5	Bilal Khalid	Bahrain	49.61	
	4	Bothwell Machihulu	Zambia	DQ	

=== Semifinals ===
First 3 of each semifinal (Q) qualified directly for the final.

Rank	Heat	Name	Nationality	Time	Notes
1	1	Daniel Caines	Great Britain	46.43	Q
2	2	Danny McFarlane	Jamaica	46.68	Q
3	1	Milton Campbell	United States	46.69	Q
4	2	Mark Hylton	Great Britain	46.87	Q
5	2	James Davis	United States	46.90	Q
6	1	David Canal	Spain	47.08	Q
7	1	Davian Clarke	Jamaica	47.17	
8	2	Félix Sánchez	Dominican Republic	47.29	
9	2	Boris Gorban	Russia	47.48	
10	1	Sunday Bada	Nigeria	48.14	
11	2	Jimisola Laursen	Sweden	48.17	
	1	Sofiane Labidi	Tunisia	DQ	

=== Final ===
Rank	Name	Nationality	Time	Notes
1st place, gold medalist(s)	Daniel Caines	Great Britain	46.40	
2nd place, silver medalist(s)	Milton Campbell	United States	46.45	
3rd place, bronze medalist(s)	Danny McFarlane	Jamaica	46.74	
4	David Canal	Spain	46.99	
5	Mark Hylton	Great Britain	47.03	
	James Davis	United States	DNF	
