= Marek Plawgo =

Polish athletics competitor

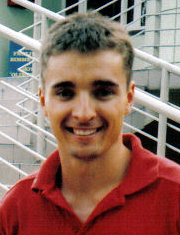

Personal information
- Born: 25 February 1981 (age 45) Ruda Śląska, Poland

Sport
- Sport: Track and field
Medal record
Representing Poland
World Championships
Bronze medal – third place	2007 Osaka	400 m hurdles
Bronze medal – third place	2007 Osaka	4 × 400 m relay
World Indoor Championships
Bronze medal – third place	2003 Birmingham	4 × 400 m relay
European Championships
Silver medal – second place	2006 Göteborg	400 m hurdles
European Indoor Championships
Gold medal – first place	2002 Vienna	400 metres
Gold medal – first place	2002 Vienna	4 × 400 m relay
European U23 Championships
Gold medal – first place	2003 Bydgoszcz	400 m hurdles
Gold medal – first place	2003 Bydgoszcz	4 × 400 metres relay

Marek Plawgo (born 25 February 1981) is a Polish athlete. He mainly competes in the 400 meters hurdles, but he also starts in the 400 meters and the 4 × 400 meters relay.

Although Plawgo lives in Bytom, he represents KS Warszawianka Warszawa. His most important event is the 400 meters hurdles. He is the holder of the national record of Poland with 48.12s. gained during the 2007 World Championships in Osaka. Plawgo also holds the Polish indoor record in the flat 400 meters with his time of 45.39, which was achieved during the 2002 European Indoor Championships in Vienna. He's a multiple-time champion of Poland in the 400 meters hurdles. In this event, the KS Warszawianka athlete finished the national championships first in 2001, 2003 and in the years 2005–2009.

== Introduction to the career ==
Before starting the professional career, in 2000, Plawgo won the gold medal at the World Junior Championships in Santiago de Chile and finished third with his colleagues from the 4 × 400 meters relay. Several months later in Osaka, the 19-year-old Pole gained a great time of 48.16s and broke the national record of Paweł Januszewski (48.17s.). The achievement was repeated by Plawgo in the semi-final of the 2004 Summer Olympics in Athens.

== Career as a senior athlete ==
At the 2002 European Indoor Championships in Vienna, the Pole was first in the 400 meters and won another gold in the 4 × 400 meters relay. The line-up of the Polish relay was Plawgo, Piotr Rysiukiewicz, Artur Gąsiewski and Robert Maćkowiak. One year later, at the European U-23 Championships in Bydgoszcz, Plawgo finished first with a good result of 48.45s.

Quite disappointing for Plawgo could be the 2004 Summer Olympics. The sportsman from Bytom was one of the Polish medal hopes. However, the best he could achieve was the 6th place in the Olympic Final. Plawgo was also a member of the Polish 4 × 400 meters relay (Piotr Klimczak, Marcin Marciniszyn, Plawgo and Rysiukiewicz) which didn't manage to qualify to the final and was classified on the 10th position.

During the 2006 European Championships in Goeteborg, Plawgo won a silver medal in the 400 meters hurdles. His result in the final was 48.71s. One year later, in June, the Pole finished second at the Super League in Munich. Originally, the winner, Periklís Iakovákis, was disqualified by the judges but later the decision was altered and the Greek remained first.

== The World Championships in Osaka ==
The biggest success of Plawgo in the professional career was achieved in 2007, during the World Championships in Osaka. The Japanese city, in which he set the national record in 2000, remained lucky for the hurdler and he finished the competitions with two bronze medals. First of them was won, obviously, in the 400 meters hurdles. The Pole was outpaced only by the Dominican legend Felix Sanchez (silver medal – 48.01s.) and magnificent Kerron Clement who finished first with 47.61s., establishing the best 2007 result in this event. Plawgo broke his own record of Poland with 48.12s. The Polish 4 × 400 meters relay was third in the final with 3:00:05, losing to the USA (2:55:56) and Bahamas (2:59:18). The final line-up was Plawgo, Daniel Dąbrowski, Marciniszyn and Kacper Kozłowski.

== After the successful 2007 ==
After the championships in Osaka, Plawgo won three meetings. The most valuable victory was the first position at the Golden League meeting in Berlin, with 49.01s. The most successful year in the '81 born sportsman's career was crowned by winning the IAAF World Final in Stuttgart with satisfying 48.36s. Plawgo was granted the prize of the best athlete of September 2007 by the European Association of Athletics. He was classified on the second position by "Track and Fields News" magazine in their ranking of the best 400 meters hurdles runners in 2007 and on the third place in the IAAF world ranking. What's more, Plawgo came 7th in the contest of "Przegląd Sportowy" (the only sport daily newspaper in Poland) and was the winner of "Złote Kolce" contest in 2007.

Before the 2008 Summer Games in Beijing, Plawgo became a medal hope of Polish fans again. Unfortunately, several weeks before the Olympic Games beginning, the Polish athlete caught an injury of his foot, which complicated his preparations to the most significant competitions of the season. Nevertheless, Plawgo made a good impression in Beijing. He repeated his '2004 performance and finished 6th with 48.52s.

== Competition record ==
Year	Competition	Venue	Position	Event	Notes
Representing Poland
1999	European Junior Championships	Riga, Latvia	4th	400 m hurdles	52.17
2000	World Junior Championships	Santiago, Chile	1st	400 m hurdles	49.23
2000	World Junior Championships	Santiago, Chile	3rd	4 × 400 m relay	3:07.05
2001	World Championships	Edmonton, Canada	18th (sf)	400 m hurdles	49.80
2001	Universiade	Beijing, China	8th	400 m hurdles	49.68
2002	European Indoor Championships	Vienna, Austria	1st	400 m	45.39 (CR, NR)
2002	European Indoor Championships	Vienna, Austria	1st	4 × 400 m relay	3:05.50 (CR)
2002	European Championships	Munich, Germany	4th	400 m	45.40
2002	European Championships	Munich, Germany	8th	4 × 400 m relay	DQ
2003	World Indoor Championships	Birmingham, United Kingdom	7th (sf)	400 m	46.82
2003	World Indoor Championships	Birmingham, United Kingdom	3rd	4 × 400 m relay	3:06.61
2003	European U23 Championships	Bydgoszcz, Poland	1st	400 m hurdles	48.45
2003	European U23 Championships	Bydgoszcz, Poland	1st	4 × 400 m relay	3:03.32
2004	Olympic Games	Athens, Greece	6th	400 m hurdles	49.00
2004	Olympic Games	Athens, Greece	10th (h)	4 × 400 m relay	3:03.69
2006	European Championships	Gothenburg, Sweden	2nd	400 m hurdles	48.71
2007	World Championships	Osaka, Japan	3rd	400 m hurdles	48.12 (NR)
2007	World Championships	Osaka, Japan	3rd	4 × 400 m relay	3:00.05
2008	Olympic Games	Beijing, China	6th	400 m hurdles	48.42
2008	Olympic Games	Beijing, China	7th	4 × 400 m relay	3:00.32
2012	European Championships	Helsinki, Finland	18th (sf)	400 m hurdles	50.77

== See also ==
- Polish records in athletics
