= Ahmed Douhou =

French sprinter (born 1976)

Personal information
- Born: 14 December 1976 (age 49) Bouake, Ivory Coast

Sport
- Sport: Track and field
Medal record
Representing Ivory Coast
African Championships
Gold medal – first place	1998 Dakar	4×100 m relay
Representing France
European Championships
Bronze medal – third place	2002 Munich	4×400 m relay
Mediterranean Games
Silver medal – second place	2005 Almeria	4x400 m relay

Ahmed Douhou (born 14 December 1976) is a French sprinter who specializes in the 200 metres. He switched nationality from his birth country Côte d'Ivoire in 2002.

He won the bronze medal in 4 × 400 metres relay at the 2002 European Championships, together with teammates Leslie Djhone, Naman Keïta and Ibrahima Wade. On the individual level he reached the semifinals of the 1997 IAAF World Indoor Championships, and participated at the 2000 and 2004 Summer Olympics.

Before switching to France he helped set a Côte d'Ivoire record in 4 × 100 metres relay of 38.60 seconds, achieved with teammates Ibrahim Meité, Yves Sonan and Eric Pacome N'Dri at the 2001 World Championships in Edmonton.

== Personal bests ==
- 100 metres - 10.36 s (2000)
- 200 metres - 20.90 s (2000)
- 400 metres - 45.86 s (2004)
- 400 metres hurdles - 55.97 s (1994)
