= Karel Bláha =

Czech sprinter (born 1975)

Karel Bláha (born 1 June 1975) is a retired Czech athlete specialising in the 400 meter dash. His best individual outing was the seventh place at the 2002 European Championships. In addition, he represented his country at the 2001 World Championships where he narrowly missed the semifinals despite equaling his personal best in the heats.

He won the gold medal in 4 × 400 metres relay at the 2000 European Indoor Championships, setting the new national record.

== Competition record ==
Year	Competition	Venue	Position	Event	Notes
Representing the Czech Republic
1998	European Championships	Budapest, Hungary	7th	4 × 400 m relay	3:04.37
2000	European Indoor Championships	Ghent, Belgium	1st	4 × 400 m relay	3:06.10
2001	World Championships	Edmonton, Canada	22nd (h)	400 m	45.82
2001	World Championships	Edmonton, Canada	19th (h)	4 × 400 m relay	3:04.27
2002	European Indoor Championships	Vienna, Austria	10th (h)	400 m	47.01
2002	European Championships	Munich, Germany	7th	400 m	46.21
2002	European Championships	Munich, Germany	4th	4 × 400 m relay	3:03.82
2006	European Championships	Gothenburg, Sweden	21st (h)	400 m	46.60

== Personal bests ==
Outdoor

- 200 metres – 21.20 (+1.6 m/s) (Kladno 2006)
- 400 metres – 45.82 (Plzeň 2000)
- 800 metres – 1:49.38 (Turnov 2001)

Indoor

- 60 metres – 7.02 (Prague 2004)
- 200 metres – 22.07 (Prague 2004)
- 400 metres – 46.39 (Stuttgart 2000)
