= Salvador Rodríguez (athlete) =

Spanish sprinter

Personal information
- Born: 13 November 1980 (age 45) Madrid, Spain
- Height: 1.80 m (5 ft 11 in)
- Weight: 73 kg (161 lb)

Sport
- Sport: Track and field
- Event: 400 metres
- Club: Puma Chapín Jerez
- Coached by: Bernardo Domínguez

Salvador Rodríguez (born 13 November 1980, in Madrid) is a retired Spanish sprinter who specialised in the 400 metres. He represented his country at one outdoor and three indoor World Championships.

== Competition record ==
Year	Competition	Venue	Position	Event	Notes
Representing Spain
1999	European Junior Championships	Riga, Latvia	14th (h)	400 m	48.09
1999	European Junior Championships	Riga, Latvia	7th	4 × 400 m relay	3:10.78
2001	European U23 Championships	Amsterdam, Netherlands	11th (h)	400 m	47.24
2001	European U23 Championships	Amsterdam, Netherlands	5th	4 × 100 m relay	40.22
2001	European U23 Championships	Amsterdam, Netherlands	4th	4 × 400 m relay	3:06.96
2001	Mediterranean Games	Radès, Tunisia	5th	400 m	47.39
2001	Mediterranean Games	Radès, Tunisia	5th	4 × 400 m relay	3:08.24
2002	European Indoor Championships	Vienna, Austria	11th (sf)	400 m	47.01
2002	European Indoor Championships	Vienna, Austria	3rd	4 × 400 m relay	3:06.60
2002	European Championships	Munich, Germany	9th (h)	4 × 400 m relay	3:05.28
2003	World Indoor Championships	Birmingham, United Kingdom	–	4 × 400 m relay	DQ
2003	World Championships	Paris, France	5th	4 × 400 m relay	3:02.50
2004	World Indoor Championships	Budapest, Hungary	13th (h)	400 m	47.53
2004	World Indoor Championships	Budapest, Hungary	10th (h)	4 × 400 m relay	3:10.95
2004	Ibero-American Championships	Huelva, Spain	8th	400 m	47.29
2006	World Indoor Championships	Moscow, Russia	7th (h)	4 × 400 m relay	3:08.07
2006	European Championships	Gothenburg, Sweden	8th	4 × 400 m relay	3:04.98

== Personal bests ==
Outdoor

- 200 metres – 20.93 (+1.0 m/s) (Avilés 2003)
- 400 metres – 45.95 (Madrid 2003)

Indoor

- 400 metres – 46.78 (Seville 2002)
