= Timothy Munnings =

Bahamian sprinter

Personal information
- Born: 22 June 1966 (age 60) Nassau, Bahamas

Sport
- Sport: Track and field
Medal record
Representing Bahamas
Olympic Games
Bronze medal – third place	2000 Sydney	4 × 400 m relay
World Championships
Gold medal – first place	2001 Edmonton	4 × 400 m relay
Commonwealth Games
Bronze medal – third place	2002 Manchester	4 × 400 m relay

Timothy Alexander "Tim" Munnings (born 22 June 1966 in Nassau) is a Bahamian athlete who mainly competes in the 400 metres.

At the 2000 Summer Olympics he ran in the heats for the Bahamian team who eventually won the bronze medal.

His personal best time is 45.81 seconds, achieved in June 2001 in Nassau. Set the day after his 35th birthday, at the time, it stood as the Masters M35 World record for over three years. Later that year, he anchored the World Champion relay team in National Record time, sprinting past Jamaica with a speedy final 100 m. While Bahamas lost to the United States in both the 2000 Olympics and 2001 World Championships, the USA was disqualified years later due to the PED doping violation by Antonio Pettigrew. After numerous appeals, the Bahamian team medals were upgraded. During the 2013 medal ceremony, Munnings was credited by teammate Carl Oliver with starting the Olympic renaissance that developed into Bahamian medal success through the decade.

== Achievements ==
Year	Competition	Venue	Position	Notes
1995	World Championships	Gothenburg, Sweden	12th (heats)	4 × 400 m relay
1996	Summer Olympics	Atlanta, United States	7th	4 × 400 m relay
1999	World Championships	Seville, Spain	7th	4 × 400 m relay
2000	Summer Olympics	Sydney, Australia	3rd	4 × 400 m relay
2001	World Championships	Edmonton, Canada	1st	4 × 400 m relay
2002	Commonwealth Games	Manchester, England	DQ (heats)	400 metres
2002	Commonwealth Games	Manchester, England	3rd	4 × 400 m relay
2003	World Indoor Championships	Birmingham, United Kingdom	DQ (heats)	4 × 400 m relay
2003	Pan American Games	Santo Domingo, Dominican Republic	5th	4 × 400 m relay
2004	World Indoor Championships	Budapest, Hungary	5th	4 × 400 m relay
2006	World Indoor Championships	Moscow, Russia	DNF (heats)	4 × 400 m relay
2006	2006 Commonwealth Games	Melbourne, Australia	3rd (heats)	4 × 400 m relay
