= Piotr Rysiukiewicz =

Polish sprinter (born 1974)

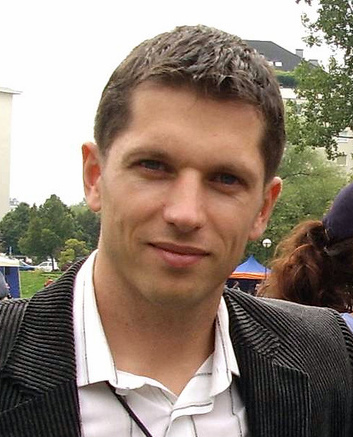
- Rysiukiewicz in 2007

Personal information
- Nationality: Polish
- Born: 14 July 1974 (age 52) Świebodzin, Poland

Sport
- Sport: sprinting
Medal record
Men's athletics
Representing Poland
Event	1st	2nd	3rd
Olympic Games	0	0	0
World Championships	0	0	2
World Indoor Championships	1	1	1
European Championships	0	1	1
European Indoor Championships	1	0	0
Total	3	2	4
World Championships
Bronze medal – third place	1997 Athens	4 × 400 m relay
Bronze medal – third place	2001 Edmonton	4 × 400 m relay
World Indoor Championships
Gold medal – first place	2001 Lisbon	4 × 400 m relay
Silver medal – second place	1999 Maebashi	4 × 400 m relay
Bronze medal – third place	2003 Birmingham	4 × 400 m relay
European Championships
Silver medal – second place	1998 Budapest	4 × 400 m relay
Bronze medal – third place	2006 Gothenburg	4 × 400 m relay
European Indoor Championships
Gold medal – first place	2002 Vienna	4 × 400 m relay

Piotr Grzegorz Rysiukiewicz (born 14 July 1974 in Świebodzin, Lubuskie) is a retired Polish sprinter who won various medals for the Polish 4 × 400 metres relay during its greatest years in the late 1990s and early 2000s. He would usually run the first leg of competitions.

He is an older brother of another sprinter, Agnieszka Rysiukiewicz.

== Competition record ==
Year	Competition	Venue	Position	Event	Notes
Representing Poland
1992	World Junior Championships	Seoul, South Korea	4th	4 × 400 m relay	3:07.01
1993	European Junior Championships	San Sebastián, Spain	6th	400 m	47.63
1993	European Junior Championships	San Sebastián, Spain	3rd	4 × 400 m relay	3:08.75
1994	European Championships	Helsinki, Finland	6th	4 × 400 m relay	3:04.22
1995	World Championships	Gothenburg, Sweden	5th	4 × 400 m relay	3:03.84
1995	Universiade	Fukuoka, Japan	11th (sf)	400 m	46.49
1995	Universiade	Fukuoka, Japan	6th	4 × 400 m relay	3:05.08
1996	Olympic Games	Atlanta, United States	28th (qf)	400 m	46.19
1996	Olympic Games	Atlanta, United States	6th	4 × 400 m relay	3:00.96
1997	World Championships	Athens, Greece	3rd	4 × 400 m relay	3:00.26
1998	Goodwill Games	Uniondale, United States	2nd	4 × 400 m relay	2:58.00 (NR)
1998	European Championships	Budapest, Hungary	2nd	4 × 400 m relay	2:58.88
1999	World Indoor Championships	Maebashi, Japan	2nd	4 × 400 m relay	3:03.01 (iAR)
1999	World Championships	Seville, Spain	14th (qf)	400 m	45.54^{1}
2000	Olympic Games	Sydney, Australia	50th (h)	400 m	46.67
2000	Olympic Games	Sydney, Australia	6th	4 × 400 m relay	3:03.22
2001	World Indoor Championships	Lisbon, Portugal	13th (h)	400 m	47.19
2001	World Indoor Championships	Lisbon, Portugal	1st	4 × 400 m relay	3:04.47
2001	World Championships	Edmonton, Canada	13th (sf)	400 m	46.12
2001	World Championships	Edmonton, Canada	3rd	4 × 400 m relay	2:59.71
2002	European Indoor Championships	Vienna, Austria	4th	400 m	46.32
2002	European Indoor Championships	Vienna, Austria	1st	4 × 400 m relay	3:05.50
2002	European Championships	Munich, Germany	12th (sf)	400 m	46.15
2002	European Championships	Munich, Germany	2nd (h)	4 × 400 m relay	3:03.11^{2}
2003	World Indoor Championships	Birmingham, United Kingdom	3rd	4 × 400 m relay	3:06.61
2004	Olympic Games	Athens, Greece	10th (h)	4 × 400 m relay	3:03.69
2005	European Indoor Championships	Madrid, Spain	–	4 × 400 m relay	DQ
2005	World Championships	Helsinki, Finland	5th	4 × 400 m relay	3:00.58
2006	European Championships	Gothenburg, Sweden	3rd	4 × 400 m relay	3:01.73

^{1} Did not finish in the semifinals

^{2} Disqualified in the final

== Personal bests ==
Outdoor

- 200 metres – 21.31 s (1999)
- 400 metres – 45.54 s (Seville 1999)

Indoor

- 200 metres – 21.73 s (Spała 2003)
- 400 metres – 46.63 s (Spała 1999)

== See also ==
- Polish records in athletics
