= 2001 European Athletics U23 Championships – Men's 400 metres hurdles =

The men's 400 metres hurdles event at the 2001 European Athletics U23 Championships was held in Amsterdam, Netherlands, at Olympisch Stadion on 13 and 14 July.

== Medalists ==
Gold	Matthew Elias; United Kingdom
Silver	Periklis Iakovakis; Greece
Bronze	Mikael Jakobsson; Sweden

== Results ==
=== Final ===
14 July

Rank	Name	Nationality	Time	Notes
1st place, gold medalist(s)	Matthew Elias	United Kingdom	49.57	
2nd place, silver medalist(s)	Periklis Iakovakis	Greece	49.63	
3rd place, bronze medalist(s)	Mikael Jakobsson	Sweden	50.86	
4	Salah-Eddine Ghaidi	France	51.13	
5	Jan Reinberg	Germany	51.14	
6	Gianni Carabelli	Italy	51.38	
7	Yevgeniy Mikheiko	Belarus	52.01	
8	José María Romera	Spain	66.00	

=== Heats ===
13 July
Qualified: first 2 in each heat and 2 best to the Final

==== Heat 1 ====
Rank	Name	Nationality	Time	Notes
1	Matthew Elias	United Kingdom	49.90	Q
2	Periklis Iakovakis	Greece	50.19	Q
3	Salah-Eddine Ghaidi	France	50.27	q
4	Magnus Norberg	Sweden	51.34	
5	Michal Uhlík	Czech Republic	51.55	
6	Federico Rubeca	Italy	51.66	
7	Constantino Navarro	Spain	52.66	

==== Heat 2 ====
Rank	Name	Nationality	Time	Notes
1	Gianni Carabelli	Italy	50.27	Q
2	José María Romera	Spain	50.57	Q
3	Yevgeniy Mikheiko	Belarus	50.70	q
4	Josef Rous	Czech Republic	51.32	
5	Tomasz Rudnik	Poland	51.43	
6	Sérgio Duro	Portugal	51.74	
7	Stéphane Pitard	France	52.08	
8	Claude Godart	Luxembourg	52.90	

==== Heat 3 ====
Rank	Name	Nationality	Time	Notes
1	Mikael Jakobsson	Sweden	50.92	Q
2	Jan Reinberg	Germany	51.01	Q
3	Richard McDonald	United Kingdom	51.08	
4	Thomas Kortbeek	Netherlands	51.16	
5	Zenon Miśtak	Poland	51.52	
6	Loïc Clément	France	51.74	
7	Platon Gavelas	Greece	52.55	
8	Radek Černý	Czech Republic	53.23	

== Participation ==
According to an unofficial count, 23 athletes from 13 countries participated in the event.

- Belarus (1)
- Czech Republic (3)
- France (3)
- Germany (1)
- Greece (2)
- Italy (2)
- Luxembourg (1)
- Netherlands (1)
- Poland (2)
- Portugal (1)
- Spain (2)
- Sweden (2)
- United Kingdom (2)
