= Leroy Colquhoun =

Jamaican sprinter (born 1980)

Medal record

Men's athletics

Representing Jamaica

World Indoor Championships
Gold medal – first place	2003 Birmingham	4 × 400 m relay

Leroy Colquhoun (born 1 March 1980) is a Jamaican sprinter. He won a silver medal in 4 × 400 metres relay at the 2003 IAAF World Indoor Championships and a gold medal in the same event at the 2004 IAAF World Indoor Championships.

Colquhoun ran track collegiately at Louisiana State University.

Before starting his sprinting career he attended trials for the Jamaica national bobsled team.

== Personal bests ==
- 400 metres – 45.50 (2001)
- 400 metres hurdles – 48.79 (2005)
