= David Canal =

Spanish sprinter (born 1978)

Medal record

Men's athletics

Representing Spain

European Championships
Silver medal – second place	2002 Munich	400 m
Bronze medal – third place	1998 Budapest	4×400 m

David Canal Valero (born 7 December 1978 in Barcelona, Catalonia) is a former Spanish sprinter who specialized in the 400 metres.

== Achievements ==
Year	Competition	Venue	Position	Event	Notes
Representing Spain
1996	World Junior Championships	Sydney, Australia	7th	400 m	47.21
1996	World Junior Championships	Sydney, Australia	4th	4x400 m relay	3:06.95
1997	European Junior Championships	Ljubljana, Slovenia	1st	400 m	46.04
1997	European Junior Championships	Ljubljana, Slovenia	1st	4x400 m relay	3:08.18
1997	World Championships	Athens, Greece	15th (h)	4x400 m relay	3:05.34
1998	Ibero-American Championships	Lisbon, Portugal	3rd	400 m	45.87
1998	Ibero-American Championships	Lisbon, Portugal	2nd	4x400 m relay	3:08.05
1998	European Championships	Budapest, Hungary	7th	400 m	45.93
1998	European Championships	Budapest, Hungary	3rd	4x400 m relay	3:02.47
1999	World Indoor Championships	Maebashi, Japan	10th (sf)	400 m	46.93
1999	World Indoor Championships	Maebashi, Japan	8th (h)	4x400 m relay	3:15.94
1999	European U23 Championships	Gothenburg, Sweden	5th	400 m	46.57
1999	European U23 Championships	Gothenburg, Sweden	8th (h)	4x400 m relay	3:10.48
1999	World Championships	Seville, Spain	24th (qf)	400 m	46.21
1999	World Championships	Seville, Spain	13th (h)	4x400 m relay	3:02.85
2000	European Indoor Championships	Ghent, Belgium	2nd	400 m	46.85
2000	Olympic Games	Sydney, Australia	17th (qf)	400 m	45.54
2000	Olympic Games	Sydney, Australia	20th (h)	4x400 m relay	3:06.87
2001	World Indoor Championships	Lisbon, Portugal	4th	400 m	46.99
2001	World Championships	Edmonton, Canada	14th (sf)	400 m	45.50
2001	World Championships	Edmonton, Canada	6th	4x400 m relay	3:02.24
2002	European Indoor Championships	Vienna, Austria	–	400 m	DQ
2002	European Indoor Championships	Vienna, Austria	3rd	4x400 m relay	3:06.60
2002	European Championships	Munich, Germany	2nd	400 m	45.24
2002	European Championships	Munich, Germany	9th (h)	4x400 m relay	3:05.28
2002	World Cup	Madrid, Spain	7th	400 m	46.21
2002	World Cup	Madrid, Spain	–	4x400 m relay	DQ
2003	World Indoor Championships	Birmingham, United Kingdom	12th (sf)	400 m	47.17
2003	World Championships	Paris, France	18th (sf)	400 m	45.63
2003	World Championships	Paris, France	5th	4x400 m relay	3:02.50
2003	World Athletics Final	Monte Carlo, Monaco	4th	400 m	45.82
2004	World Indoor Championships	Budapest, Hungary	8th (sf)	400 m	46.70
2004	World Indoor Championships	Budapest, Hungary	10th (h)	4x400 m relay	3:10.95
2004	Olympic Games	Athens, Greece	30th (h)	200 m	21.18
2004	Olympic Games	Athens, Greece	46th (h)	400 m	47.23
2004	Olympic Games	Athens, Greece	14th (h)	4x400 m relay	3:05.03
2005	European Indoor Championships	Madrid, Spain	2nd	400 m	46.64
2005	European Indoor Championships	Madrid, Spain	5th	4x400 m relay	3:11.72
2005	Mediterranean Games	Almería, Spain	9th (h)	400 m	46.78
2005	Mediterranean Games	Almería, Spain	1st	4x400 m relay	3:03.65
2006	World Indoor Championships	Moscow, Russia	17th (h)	400 m	47.38
2006	World Indoor Championships	Moscow, Russia	7th (h)	4x400 m relay	3:08.07

=== Personal bests ===
- 100 metres - 10.53 s (2002)
- 200 metres - 20.68 s (2004)
- 400 metres - 45.01 s (2003)
