= Matthew Elias =

Welsh athletics competitor

Matt Elias
- Elias in 2002

Personal information
- Born: 26 April 1979 (age 47) Cardiff, Wales
- Height: 183 cm (6 ft 0 in)
- Weight: 70 kg (154 lb)

Sport
- Sport: Athletics
- Event: Hurdles
- Club: Cardiff AAC
Medal record
Men's athletics
Representing Great Britain
European Championships
Gold medal – first place	2002 Munich	4 × 400 m relay
Representing Wales
Commonwealth Games
Bronze medal – third place	1998 Kuala Lumpur	4x400m relay

Matthew John Elias (born 25 April 1979) is a Welsh retired athlete who specialised in the 400 metres sprint and 400 metres hurdles. During his international career he represented Great Britain. In 2003 he won a gold medal at the European Championships and at the 2004 Olympic Games in Athens he finished 5th in the 4 × 400 m relay, He is also a part of Super Schools.

He won the European Under 23 Championships for the 400 m hurdles in 2001 in a time of 49.57. The following year he was to have his most prolific season winning two silver medals in the 2002 Commonwealth Games in Manchester.

== Biography ==
Matthew Elias was born in 1979 in Cardiff, Wales, one of two sons born to John Elias and Kathryn (née Hutchinson), the other being Ben (born 1976). In 1998, Elias was part of the Welsh team that competed at the 1998 Commonwealth Games. He competed in the 4 × 400 metres relay and set a new Welsh record in the final on the way to a bronze medal.

In 1999, he won his first of three Welsh 400 metres titles. He also competed at the 1999 European Athletics U23 Championships that year, in the 400 metres hurdles and 4 × 400 metres relay. He won his heat of the 400 metres hurdles with a season's best of 50.84, before finishing last by over a second and a half in the final. He ran only in the final of the 4 × 400 metres relay, running second leg to help the British team secure a bronze medal.

In 2000, he won the Amateur Athletic Association (AAA) U23 400 metres hurdles title. He also won the Welsh 400 metres hurdles title.

In 2001, he won the 400 metres at the Welsh Indoor Championships. He competed in the 2001 IAAF World Indoor Championships in the men's 4 × 400 metres relay, finishing second behind eventual champions Poland in the heats before finishing outside the medals in fourth in the final. He retained his AAA 400 metres hurdles title, running almost a second and a half quicker than he had the previous year. He also switched back to the 400 metres at the Welsh championships and won his second 400 metres title. He competed at the 2001 European Athletics U23 Championships in the 400 metres hurdles and the 4 × 400 metres relay, taking home two gold medals. In his hurdles heat he was the only athlete to go under 50 seconds, recording a time of 49.90 to win. In the final he set a season's best of 49.57 to win the gold medal. He raced in both the heats and the final, running anchor leg on both occasions to lead Great Britain to a closely fought victory over Germany.

In 2002, he won the 400 metres hurdles at the English Commonwealth Games trials, held in Manchester. He also won his third and final Welsh 400 metres title. He competed at the 2002 Commonwealth Games, winning two silvers, one in the individual 400 metres hurdles and the other in the men's 4 × 400 metres relay as part of a Welsh quartet that included British-record holder Iwan Thomas. In the 400 metres hurdles, Elias set a Welsh record in the heats to go through to the final as the fastest qualifier, before being beaten by England's Chris Rawlinson in the final. In the 4 × 400 metres relay, Elias ran anchor leg in the final, losing out on the gold medal by 0.01 seconds as he was beaten by England's Daniel Caines to the line, whilst setting another Welsh record. He competed in the 2002 European Athletics Championships in both the 400 metres hurdles and 4 × 400 metres relay. In the 400 metres hurdles, he finished third in his heat, failing to progress to the semi-finals. In the relay, he ran anchor leg in the heats, in which Great Britain won their race, before running second leg in the final on the way to winning a gold medal.
