= Oleg Mishukov =

Russian sprinter

Personal information
- Nationality: Russian
- Born: 31 August 1980 (age 46) Nizhny Novgorod, Soviet Union

Sport
- Sport: Sprinting
- Event: 400 metres
Medal record
Men's athletics
Representing Russia
European Championships
Silver medal – second place	2002 Munich	4×400 m relay

Oleg Mishukov (born 31 August 1980) is a Russian sprinter. He competed in the men's 400 metres at the 2004 Summer Olympics. He also won a silver medal in the 4 × 400 m relay at the 2002 European Athletics Championships.
