= Ingo Schultz =

German sprinter

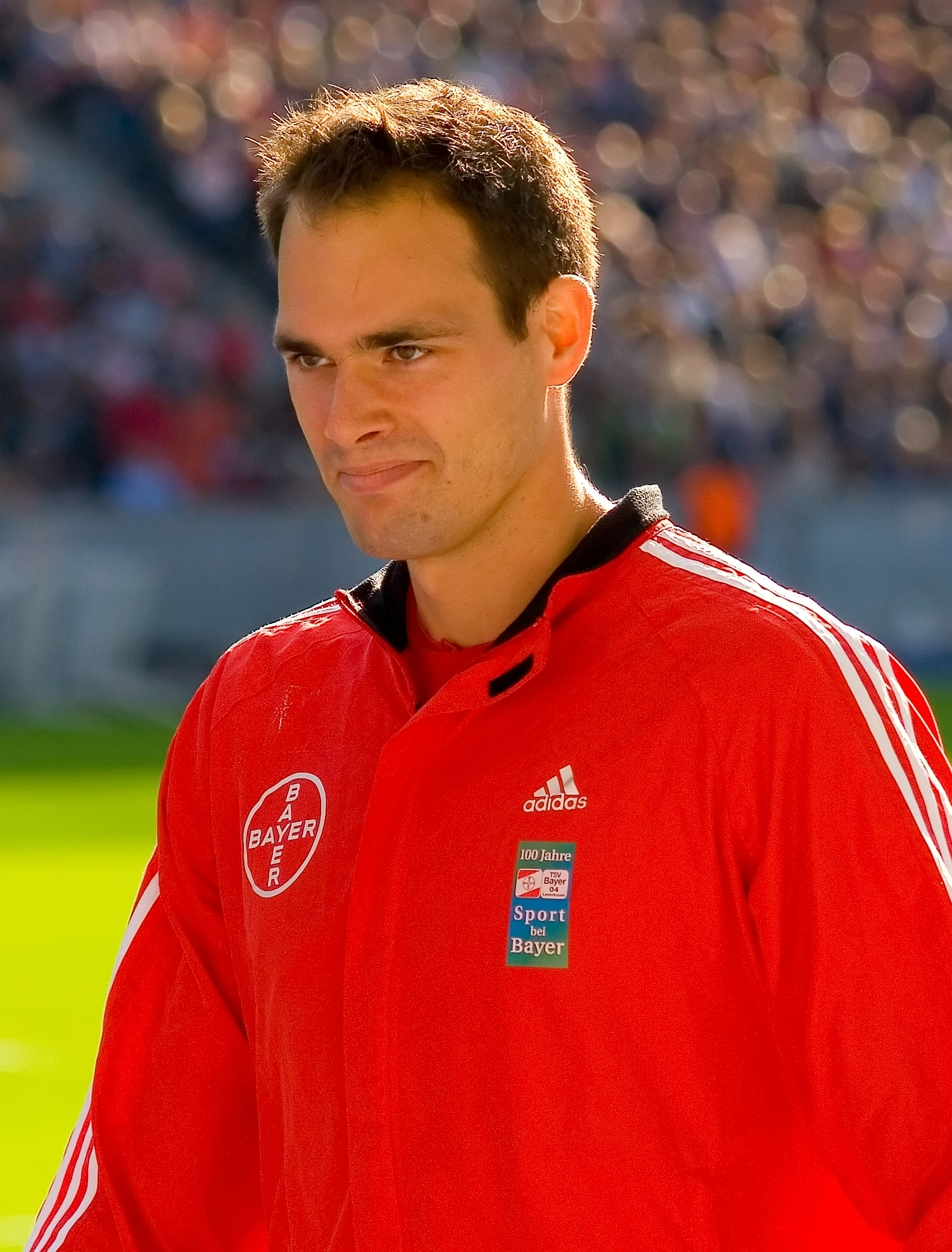
- Schultz in 2007

Personal information
- Born: 26 July 1975 (age 51) Lingen, West Germany
- Height: 2.01 m (6 ft 7 in)
- Weight: 99 kg (218 lb)

Sport
- Country: Germany
- Sport: Athletics
- Event: 400 metres

Achievements and titles
- Personal bests: 400 metres: 44.66 (Edmonton; 5 August 2001)
Medal record
Men's athletics
Representing Germany
World Championships
Silver medal – second place	2001 Edmonton	400 m
European Championships
Gold medal – first place	2002 Munich	400 m

Ingo Schultz (born 26 July 1975) is a retired German track and field athlete who competed in the 400 metres.

== Career ==
Schultz was born in Lingen. He took up athletics in 1997, and ran his first 400 metres race in 1998, clocking in 49.45 seconds. The next season, he lowered his time to 45.99 s.

His personal best time was 44.66 seconds, achieved in the heats at the 2001 World Championships in Edmonton. This places him third on the German all-time list, only behind Thomas Schönlebe and Erwin Skamrahl. His personal best 200 metres time is 20.65 seconds, achieved in August 2002 in Brussels.

Schultz represented the sports clubs LG Olympia Dortmund and TSG Bergedorf. He was the German Athletics Champion for three years in a row, from 2002 until 2004.

== Achievements ==
Year	Tournament	Venue	Result	Event
2000	European Indoor Championships	Ghent, Belgium	2nd	4 × 400 m relay
2001	World Championships	Edmonton, Canada	2nd	400 m
2002	European Championships	Munich, Germany	1st	400 m
2002	European Championships	Munich, Germany	7th	4 × 400 m relay
2002	World Cup	Madrid, Spain	2nd	400 m
2002	World Cup	Madrid, Spain	7th	4 × 400 m relay
2004	Olympic Games	Athens, Greece	7th	4 × 400 m relay
