= Ioan Vieru =

Romanian sprinter (born 1979)

Medal record

Representing Romania

Men's athletics

European Indoor Championships
Bronze medal – third place	2002 Vienna	400 m
Bronze medal – third place	2009 Torino	400 m

Ioan Lucian Vieru (born 4 January 1979) is a Romanian sprinter who specializes in the 400 metres.

He won the bronze medals at the 2002 European Indoor Championships and the 2009 European Indoor Championships. He also competed at the 2002 European Championships, the 2003 World Indoor Championships, the 2003 World Championships, the 2006 European Championships and the 2007 World Championships without reaching the final.

His personal best time is 45.60 seconds, achieved in July 2006 in Longeville-les-Metz.

== Doping ==
Vieru tested positive for stanozolol 22 February 2004 and received a two-year doping ban.
