= Stelios Dimotsios =

Greek sprinter (born 1974)

Stelios Dimotsios (born 13 November 1974) is a former Greek sprinter who competed in the 2000 Summer Olympics, in the 2004 Summer Olympics, and in the 2008 Summer Olympics. He was born in Larissa.

He represented Greece at the European Athletics Championships in 1998 and 2002, the 2003 World Championships in Athletics and the 2001 IAAF World Indoor Championships.

== Honours ==
Year	Competition	Venue	Position	Event	Notes
1998	European Championships	Budapest, Hungary	9th (sf)	4 × 400 m relay	3:06.48 SB
2000	Olympic Games	Sydney, Australia	18th (h)	4 × 400 m relay	3:06.50
2001	World Indoor Championships	Lisbon, Portugal	6th (sf)	4 × 400 m relay	3:10.16 NR
2001	Mediterranean Games	Tunis, Tunisia	1st	4 × 400 m relay	3:07.28
2002	European Championships	Munich, Germany	6th	4 × 400 m relay	3:04.26
2003	World Championships	Paris, France	6th	4 × 400 m relay	3:02.56
2004	Olympic Games	Athens, Greece	44th (h)	400 m	46.51 SB
2004	Olympic Games	Athens, Greece	12th (sf)	4 × 400 m relay	3:04.27 SB
2008	Olympic Games	Beijing, China	15th (sf)	4 × 400 m relay	3:04.30 SB
