= Cédric Van Branteghem =

Belgian sprinter

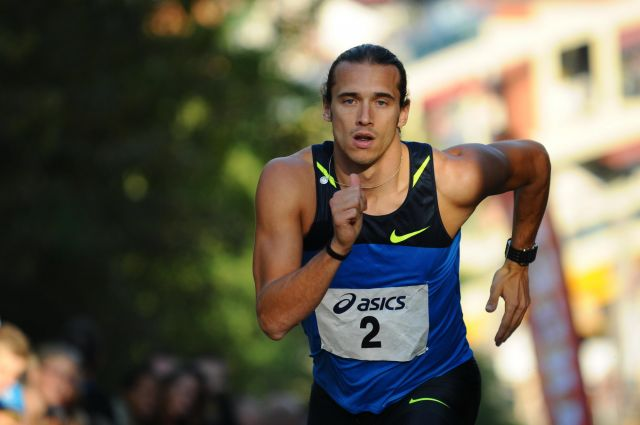
- Van Branteghem in 2008

Medal record

Men's athletics

Representing Belgium

World Indoor Championships
Silver medal – second place	2010 Doha	4x400 m relay

European Championships
Bronze medal – third place	2010 Barcelona	4x400 m relay

Cédric Marie Carlos Thérèse Van Branteghem (born 13 March 1979 in Ghent) is a former Belgian sprinter who specialized in the 400 metres.

== Achievements ==
Year	Competition	Venue	Position	Event	Notes
Representing Belgium
2001	European U23 Championships	Amsterdam, Netherlands	17th (h)	400m	47.65
2002	European Championships	Munich, Germany	6th	400 m	45.95
2003	World Athletics Final	Monte Carlo, Monaco	6th	400 m	46.02
2005	Universiade	İzmir, Turkey	4th	400 m	46.17
2010	European Championships	Barcelona, Spain	3rd	4 × 400 m	3:02.60 s

=== Personal bests ===
- 100 metres - 10.54 s (2003)
- 200 metres - 20.60 s (2003)
- 400 metres - 45.02 s (2003)
