= Jared Deacon =

British athlete (born 1975)

Personal information
- Nationality: British (English)
- Born: 15 October 1975 (age 50) South Shields, Tyne and Wear, Great Britain
- Height: 185 cm (6 ft 1 in)
- Weight: 77 kg (170 lb)

Sport
- Sport: Athletics
- Event: 400m
- Club: South Shields Harriers
Medal record
Athletics
Representing England
Commonwealth Games
Gold medal – first place	2002 Manchester	4×400 m relay
Silver medal – second place	1998 Kuala Lumpur	4×400 m relay
Representing Great Britain
World Indoor Championships
Silver medal – second place	2003 Birmingham	4×400 m relay
European Championships
Gold medal – first place	2002 Munich	4 × 400 m relay
Summer Universiade
Silver medal – second place	1999 Palma de Mallorca	4x400 m relay
Bronze medal – third place	1995 Fukuoka	4x400 m relay
Bronze medal – third place	1997 Catania	4x400 m relay

Jared Mark Deacon (born 15 October 1975) is a male British former sprint athlete who specialised in the 400 metres. He was born in South Shields and competed in the 2000 Summer Olympics.

== Biography ==
He was a regular feature in the international British 4 × 400 metres relay team, competing at the 1999 World Championships in Athletics, the 2003 IAAF World Indoor Championships and was also a three-time relay medallist at the Summer Universiade from 1995 to 1999.

He represented England and won a silver medal in the 4 × 400 metres relay event, at the 1998 Commonwealth Games in Kuala Lumpur, Malaysia. The other team members consisted of Solomon Wariso, Mark Richardson, Paul Slythe, Sean Baldock and Mark Hylton.

He was a relay gold medallist for Great Britain at the 2002 European Athletics Championships and for England at the 2002 Commonwealth Games.
