= Paul McKee (athlete) =

Irish sprinter

Personal information
- Born: November 15, 1977 (age 48) Belfast, Northern Ireland

Sport
- Sport: Athletics
Medal record
Representing Ireland
World Indoor Championships
Bronze medal – third place	2003 Birmingham	400m

Paul "Junior" McKee (born 15 November 1977 in Belfast, Northern Ireland) is an Irish sprint athlete. He has represented Ireland many times in international competition, including being a member of the Irish 4 x 400 metres relay team at the Sydney Olympics. He has also represented Northern Ireland, at the Commonwealth Games.

McKee is the former Irish record holder over 400 metres outdoors and indoors. The outdoor time of 45.58 s was recorded in winning the 2002 Irish Championships, and is still the Championship record, with the indoor record (45.99 s) being set when tied for third position with Britain's Jamie Baulch in the 400m final at the 2003 IAAF World Indoor Championships. Paul's times have since been bettered by European Indoor Champion David Gillick in 2007.

McKee was part of the 4 x 400 metres relay team (alongside Robert Daly, Antoine Burke & David McCarthy) that set the Irish record of 3:03.73 in Munich, 10th Aug 2002.
