= Daniel Caines =

British athlete (born 1979)

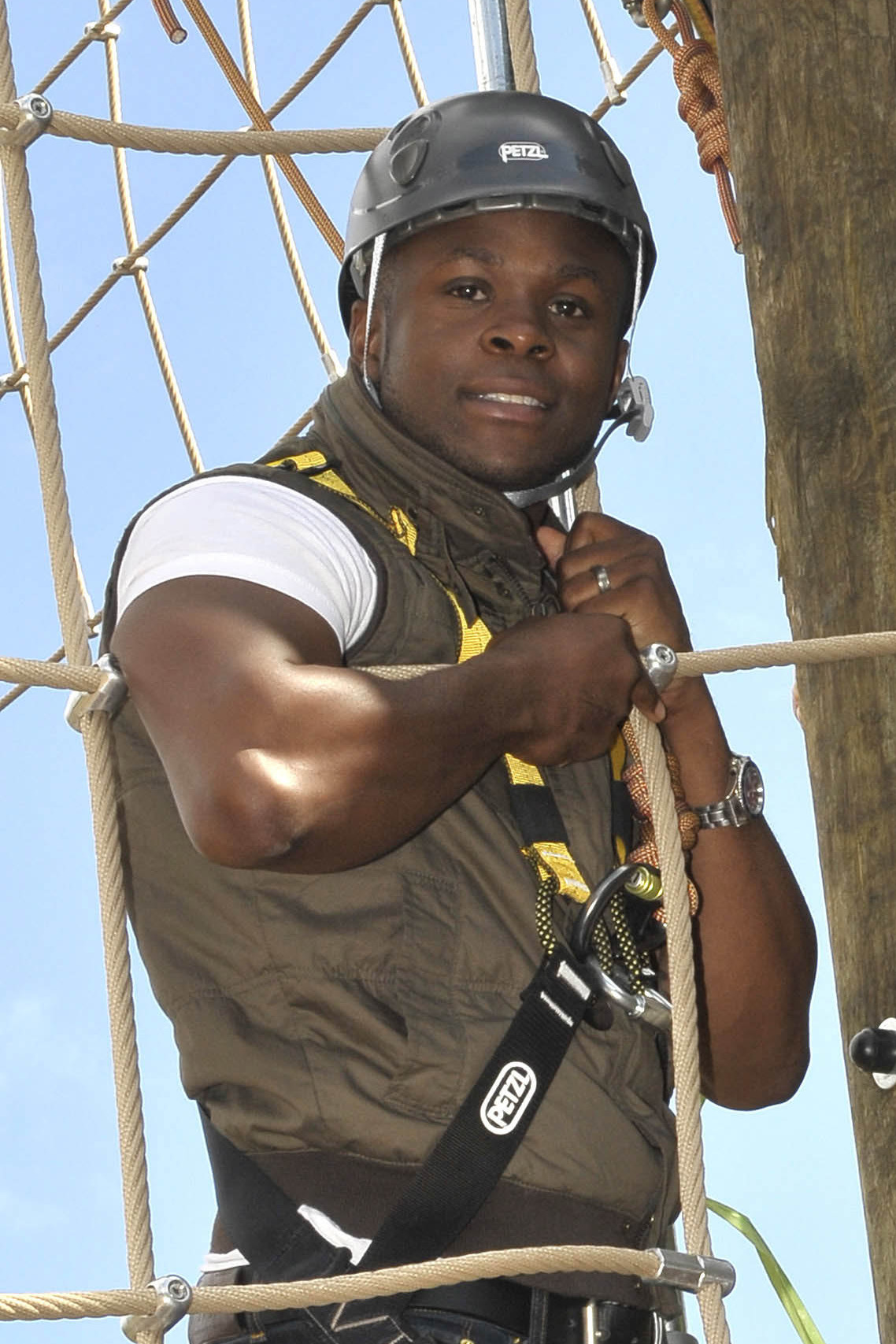

Personal information
- Nationality: British (English)
- Born: 15 May 1979 (age 47) Solihull, England
- Height: 178 cm (5 ft 10 in)
- Weight: 73 kg (161 lb)

Sport
- Sport: athletics
- Event: 400m
- Club: Birchfield Harriers
Medal record
Men's athletics
Representing Great Britain
World Indoor Championships
| Gold medal – first place | 2001 Lisbon | 400 m |
| Silver medal – second place | 2003 Birmingham | 400 m |
| Silver medal – second place | 2003 Birmingham | 4 × 400 m relay |
European Championships
| Gold medal – first place | 2002 Munich | 4 × 400 m relay |
| Bronze medal – third place | 2002 Munich | 400 m |

Daniel Stephen Caines (born 15 May 1979) is an English former athlete who mainly competed in the 400 metres and competed at the 2000 Summer Olympics and 2004 Summer Olympics.

== Biography ==
Caines was born in Solihull and educated at Solihull School. He has a Kittian descent and grew up with an Adventist background.

At the 2000 Olympic Games in Sydney, he represented Great Britain in the 400 metres and the 400 metres relay. Caines won the gold medal at the 2002 European Athletics Championships in the 4 × 400 m relay.

Caines became the British 400 metres champion after winning the British AAA Championships title in 2003.

A second Olympic appearance for the Great Britain Olympic team arrived at the 2004 Olympic Games in Athens.

== Achievements ==
| Year | Competition | Venue | Position | Event | Notes |
Representing Great Britain
| 1998 | World Junior Championships | Annecy, France | 5th | 4 × 400 m relay | 3:06.32 |
| 2000 | Olympic Games | Sydney, Australia | 5th | 4 × 400 m relay | 3:01.22 |
| 2001 | World Indoor Championships | Lisbon, Portugal | 1st | 400 metres | 46.40 |
| 2002 | European Championships | Munich, Germany | 3rd | 400 metres | 45.28 |
| 2002 | European Championships | Munich, Germany | 1st | 4 × 400 m relay | 3:01.25 |
| 2003 | World Indoor Championships | Birmingham, England | 2nd | 400 metres | 45.43 |
| 2003 | World Indoor Championships | Birmingham, England | 3rd | 4 × 400 m relay | 3:06.12 |

=== Personal bests ===
- 200 metres – 20.84 s (2003)
- 400 metres – 44.98 s (2002)
