= Jamie Baulch =

Welsh sprinter (born 1973)

Personal information
- Nationality: British (Welsh)
- Born: 3 May 1973 (age 53) Nottingham, England
- Height: 1.75 m (5 ft 9 in)

Sport
- Sport: Athletics
- Event: 400m
- Club: Cardiff AAC
Medal record
Men's athletics
Representing Great Britain
Olympic Games
Silver medal – second place	1996 Atlanta	4 × 400 m relay
World Championships
Gold medal – first place	1997 Athens	4 × 400 m relay
World Indoor Championships
Gold medal – first place	1999 Maebashi	400 m
Silver medal – second place	1997 Paris	400 m
Silver medal – second place	2003 Birmingham	400 m
European Championships
Gold medal – first place	1998 Budapest	4 × 400 m relay
Gold medal – first place	2002 Munich	4 × 400 m relay
Representing Wales
Commonwealth Games
Silver medal – second place	2002 Manchester	4 × 400 m relay
Bronze medal – third place	1998 Kuala Lumpur	4 × 400 m relay

James Stephen Baulch (born 3 May 1973) is a retired Welsh sprint athlete and television presenter. He won the 400 metres gold medal at the 1999 World Indoor Championships. As a member of British 4 × 400 metres relay teams, he won a gold medal at the 1997 World Championships, and got the silver medal at the 1996 Olympic Games. He represented Wales at the Commonwealth Games where he got an individual silver and a bronze medal in the 4 × 400 m relay.

== Athletics career ==
=== Early career ===
Baulch made his debut for the GB & NI team at a Junior International in Salamanca, Spain, in 1991, winning the 200 m and breaking the Welsh record in that race. Baulch then changed his distance preference becoming a 400 metres specialist. Baulch particularly excelled at running the distance indoors (where races are usually run on 200 m tracks rather than outdoor tracks which are 400 m long). He won the 400 m gold medal at the World Indoor Championships in 1999, and also claimed silver and bronze medals at the event in 1997 and 2003.

In 1993 Baulch ran a Welsh record 46.50 at Sheffield in his first individual race at the distance since 1990, and he made a breakthrough in 1995 when he progressed to 45.14.

=== 1996-99 ===
In 1996 Baulch ran a 44.19 second leg for Britain's Olympic silver medal team that set a European record, and set his fifth Welsh record with 44.57.

Baulch was a member of the British 4 × 400 m relay team which finished second in the 1997 World Championships. However, on 7 January 2010, it was announced the British team were to be awarded the gold medal as they were beaten by a United States team which included Antonio Pettigrew, who subsequently admitted to having taken performance-enhancing drugs, thus disqualifying the US team. Baulch received his World Championship gold medal in May 2010 and, although he was happy, he said: "It would have been great to have been in front of 80,000 people up on the rostrum...nothing can replace that. This is a second best unfortunately, but it's nice to be recognised".

In 1997 he set Welsh indoor records at 46.36 and 46.13 before breaking Todd Bennett's 12-year-old UK and Commonwealth indoor record of 45.56 with 45.39 at the UK Trials and then took the World Indoor silver behind Sunday Bada (Nigeria). Later he made the World final outdoors with a season's best 44.69 in the semis and ran a 44.08 third leg on the British silver-medal relay team.

In 1999 he won all of his five competitions at 400 m, including taking the gold medal at the World Indoor Championships in Maebashi, Japan and running a best time of 45.60 in Birmingham.

Outdoors he had a best of 44.82 in Lausanne, which he followed with a clear win at the AAAs in 45.36. At the World Championships he had four individual runs in the low-45s, again making the final, and ran a 44.24 anchor leg for the British team that went out in the heats of the 4 × 400 m.

=== 2000-03 ===
In 2000 Baulch won over 400 m at the European Cup and had a season's best of 45.06, but had a disappointing Olympic Games, going out in the heats of the 400 m in 46.52, although producing a final leg of 44.65 to ensure that Britain made the final of the relay.

Baulch was selected as captain of the British team at the 2001 World Indoors, but had to withdraw through injury and struggled for form in the summer, with a season's best of 46.15 in the heats at Edmonton, where he ran an encouraging 44.4 second leg for the British team in the final of the World 4 × 400 m. With an individual best of 46.01, he was again seen to best effect in relays in 2002, with a third leg of 45.1 to help Britain to victory in the European Cup 4 × 400 m and a third leg of 44.5 for the Welsh team that took the silver medal at the Commonwealth Games in a race against England.

He came back to form in 2003 with two bronze medals at the World Indoors, when he ran 45.99 to share the individual bronze medal with Paul McKee and in the relay. He ran a solid third leg for the British 4 × 400 m team at the European Cup, but had a disappointing outdoor season with a best of 46.43.

=== Change of coach ===
Baulch left coach Linford Christie in a bid to revive his athletics career, moving to Atlanta with new trainer Innocent Egbunike of Nigeria, a 4 × 400 m bronze medallist at the 1984 Olympics and a silver medallist in the individual 400 m at the world championships in 1987.

== Media career ==
In 1999 and 2000, Baulch hosted the British children's series Energize! He has also appeared on A Question of Sport, and finished third in the BBC programme Superstars in 2003. He was a trainee ranger in Safari School, broadcast in January–February 2007, and competed in Celebrity Mastermind in 2014. His specialist subject was the musician, Prince. Baulch became part of a circus act on Cirque de celebrite.

An Olympic special of Dancing on Ice aired in July 2012, before the London 2012 Summer Olympics. It featured medal-winning Olympic athletes, including Baulch.

== Post-Athletics and business ventures ==
After his retirement from athletics in 2005 Baulch set up several different businesses including Definitive, a sports management company and sports memorabilia company Authentic Sports. Baulch also launched fundraising platform uWin, and silent auction hosting company, BidAid.

Baulch is part-owner of fashion brand Crow & Jester. Baulch is also known to be actively involved with Jaguar Cars. From 2009- 2015 Jamie was an Ambassador for the Jaguar Academy of Sport, playing a key role in mentoring the next generation of British sporting talent.

Jamie heads up The "21 Day ShapeUp by the Family" online challenge.

Baulch also became a squad member for the Welsh touch rugby team in 2010 which won the European cup later that year.

== Charity work ==
- Jamie Baulch has been involved with a Welsh charity called Ty Hafan, a children's hospice.
- Baulch also competed in race against a racehorse raising money for Barnardos.
- Baulch also ran in the London Marathon in 2011 raising money for Barnardos.
- Baulch is now the proud Founder and owner of BidAid, an online charity auction business which has helped raised millions for worthy causes. Launched in 2016, BidAid provides tech solutions and bespoke memorabilia for virtual, hybrid and live events. It also offers industry leading event auction software, designed specifically for charity fundraising.

== Trampolining ==
Baulch excelled as a trampolinist in his youth, and won a silver medal at the Welsh Schools Trampoline Championship in 1991.

== Family and personal life ==
Baulch was born in Nottingham, but raised by adoptive parents in Risca, near Newport, Wales. Baulch is mixed race, his biological parents being a white English mother and a black Jamaican father. In 2014 Baulch made a TV documentary for the BBC, Being Jamie Baulch: Looking for My Birth Mum, where he tracked down and was reunited with his birth mother. He then made a follow-up documentary for the BBC, Being Jamie Baulch: The Search for My Birth Dad, in 2016.

== Achievements ==
=== Personal outdoor bests ===
Event	Time (seconds)	Venue	Date
100 metres	10.51	Cardiff	22 July 1995
200 metres	20.84	Victoria	24 August 1994
300 metres	32.06	Cardiff	31 May 1997
400 metres	44.57	Lausanne	3 July 1996

=== Personal indoor bests ===
Event	Time (seconds)	Venue	Date
60 metres	6.76	Birmingham	22 January 1995
200 metres	20.84	Birmingham	26 January 1997
400 metres	45.39	Birmingham	9 February 1997

=== Medals ===
Year	Competition	Venue	Position	Event	Notes
1992	World Junior Championships	Seoul, South Korea	1st	4 × 100 m	
1994	World Cup	London, England	1st	4 × 400 m	
1996	Summer Olympics	Atlanta, United States	2nd	4 × 400 m	European record
1997	World Indoor Championships	Paris, France	2nd	400 m	
1997	World Championships	Athens, Greece	1st	4 × 400 m	
1998	European Championships	Budapest, Hungary	1st	4 × 400 m	
1998	Commonwealth Games	Kuala Lumpur, Malaysia	3rd	4 × 400 m	
1998	World Cup	Johannesburg, South Africa	2nd	4 × 400 m	
1999	World Indoor Championships	Maebashi, Japan	1st	400 m	
2000	Olympic Games	Sydney, Australia	5th	4 × 400 m	
2002	European Championships	Munich, Germany	1st	4 × 400 m	
2002	Commonwealth Games	Manchester, England	2nd	4 × 400 m	
2003	World Indoor Championships	Birmingham, England	3rd	400 m	tied
