= David McCarthy (sprinter) =

Irish sprinter

Personal information
- Born: July 16, 1983 (age 43) (Republic of Ireland) Dublin
- Education: UL
- Height: 1.94 m (6 ft 4 in)
- Weight: 81 kg (179 lb; 12.8 st)

Sport
- Country: Ireland
- Club: Le Cheile AC
Medal record
Men's Athletics
Representing Ireland
World Indoor Athletics Championships
Bronze medal – third place	Budapest 2004	4x400 m
- Updated on 2010

David McCarthy (born 16 July 1983 in Dublin) is an Irish medal-winning sprinter who specialized in the 400 metres and began racing over 800 metres in 2007.

He finished seventh at the 2002 World Junior Championships in Kingston and fifth at the 2003 IAAF World Indoor Championships in Birmingham. He won the bronze medal in the 4 x 400 metres relay at the 2004 World Indoor Championships, together with teammates Robert Daly, Gary Ryan and David Gillick.

His personal best time is 46.05 seconds, achieved in July 2003 in Bydgoszcz.
