= 2002 European Athletics Championships =

18th European Athletics Championships
- Dates: 6–11 August
- Host city: Munich, Germany
- Venue: Olympic Stadium
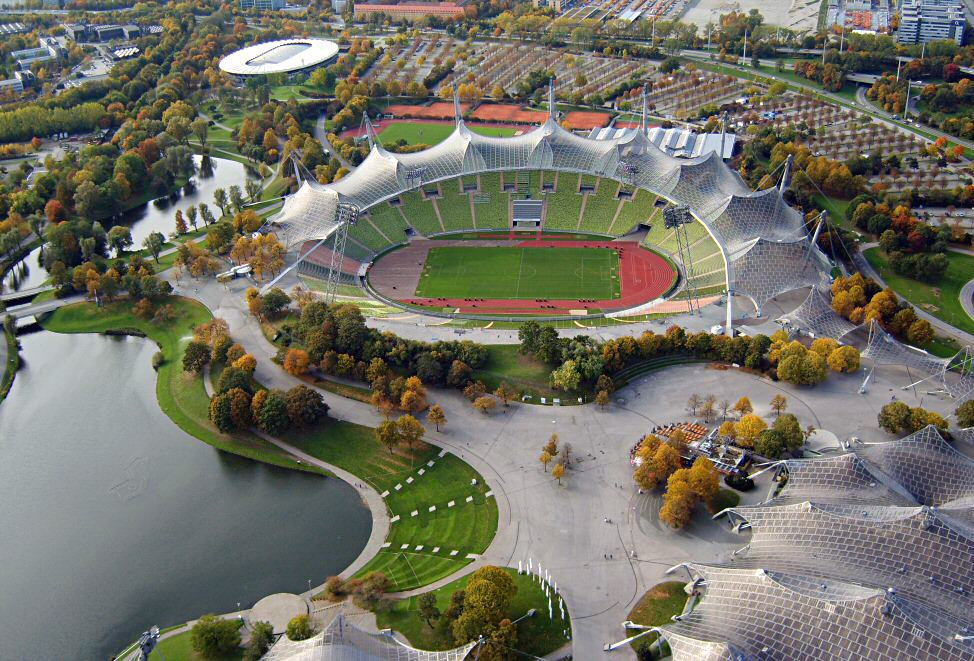
- Level: Senior
- Type: Outdoor
- Events: 46 (men: 24; women: 22)
- Participation: 1162 athletes from 47 nations

The 18th European Athletics Championships were held from 6 August to 11 August 2002 in the Olympic Stadium of Munich, Germany.

== Men's results ==
=== Track ===
1994 |1998 |2002 |2006 |2010 |

Event	Gold		Silver		Bronze	
100 m	Francis Obikwelu; Portugal	10.06^{1}	Darren Campbell; Great Britain	10.15	Roland Németh; Hungary	10.27
200 m	Konstantinos Kenteris; Greece	19.85	Francis Obikwelu; Portugal	20.21	Marlon Devonish; Great Britain	20.24
400 m	Ingo Schultz; Germany	45.14	David Canal; Spain	45.24	Daniel Caines; Great Britain	45.28
800 m	Wilson Kipketer; Denmark	1:47.25	André Bucher; Switzerland	1:47.43	Nils Schumann; Germany	1:47.60
1500 m	Mehdi Baala; France	3:45.25	Reyes Estévez; Spain	3:45.25	Rui Silva; Portugal	3:45.43
5000 m	Alberto García; Spain	13:38.18	Ismaïl Sghyr; France	13:39.81	Serhiy Lebid; Ukraine	13:40.00
10,000 m	José Manuel Martínez; Spain	27:47.65	Dieter Baumann; Germany	27:47.87	José Ríos; Spain	27:48.29
Marathon	Janne Holmén; Finland	2:12:14	Pavel Loskutov; Estonia	2:13:18	Julio Rey; Spain	2:13:21
110 metres hurdles	Colin Jackson; Great Britain	13.11	Staņislavs Olijars; Latvia	13.22	Artur Kohutek; Poland	13.32
400 metres hurdles	Stéphane Diagana; France	47.58	Jiří Mužík; Czech Republic	48.43	Paweł Januszewski; Poland	48.46
3000 metres steeplechase	Antonio David Jiménez; Spain	8:24.34	Simon Vroemen; Netherlands	8:24.45	Luis Miguel Martín; Spain	8:24.72
20 kilometres walk	Paquillo Fernández; Spain	1:18:37	Vladimir Andreyev; Russia	1:19:56	Juan Manuel Molina; Spain	1:20:36
50 kilometres walk	Robert Korzeniowski; Poland	3:36:39 WR	Aleksey Voyevodin; Russia	3:40:16	Jesús Ángel García; Spain	3:44:33
4 × 100 metres relay	Ukraine; Kostyantyn Vasyukov; Kostyantyn Rurak; Anatoliy Dovhal; Oleksandr Kaydash	38.53^{1}	Poland; Ryszard Pilarczyk; Łukasz Chyła; Marcin Nowak; Marcin Urbaś	38.71	Germany; Ronny Ostwald; Marc Blume; Alexander Kosenkow; Christian Schacht	38.88
4 × 400 metres relay	Great Britain; Jared Deacon; Matthew Elias; Jamie Baulch; Daniel Caines	3:01.25	Russia; Oleg Mishukov; Andrey Semyonov; Ruslan Mashchenko; Yuriy Borzakovskiy	3:01.34	France; Leslie Djhone; Ahmed Douhou; Naman Keïta; Ibrahima Wade	3:02.76

^{1} Dwain Chambers originally won the 100 m in 9.96 and was part of the British team (with Christian Malcolm, Darren Campbell and Marlon Devonish) that won the 4 × 100 m relay in 38.19, but he was disqualified with the British team in August 2003 after he admitted to using THG between 2000 and 2002.

=== Field ===
1994 | 1998 | 2002 | 2006 | 2010

Event	Gold		Silver		Bronze	
High jump	Yaroslav Rybakov; Russia	2.31	Stefan Holm; Sweden	2.29	Staffan Strand; Sweden	2.27
Long jump	Olexiy Lukashevych; Ukraine	8.08	Siniša Ergotić; Croatia	8.00	Yago Lamela; Spain	7.99
Pole vault	Aleksandr Averbukh; Israel	5.85	Lars Börgeling; Germany	5.80	Tim Lobinger; Germany	5.80
Triple jump	Christian Olsson; Sweden	17.53	Charles Friedek; Germany	17.33	Jonathan Edwards; Great Britain	17.32
Shot put	Yuriy Bilonoh; Ukraine	21.37	Joachim Olsen; Denmark	21.16	Ralf Bartels; Germany	20.58
Discus throw	Róbert Fazekas; Hungary	68.83	Virgilijus Alekna; Lithuania	66.62	Michael Möllenbeck; Germany	66.37
Javelin throw	Steve Backley; Great Britain	88.54	Sergey Makarov; Russia	88.05	Boris Henry; Germany	85.33
Hammer throw	Adrián Annus; Hungary	81.17	Vladyslav Piskunov; Ukraine	80.39	Alexandros Papadimitriou; Greece	80.21
Decathlon	Roman Šebrle; Czech Republic	8800	Erki Nool; Estonia	8438	Lev Lobodin; Russia	8390

== Women's results ==
=== Track ===
1994 | 1998 | 2002 | 2006 | 2010

Event	Gold		Silver		Bronze	
100 metres	Ekaterini Thanou; Greece	11.10	Kim Gevaert; Belgium	11.22	Manuela Levorato; Italy	11.23
200 metres	Muriel Hurtis; France	22.43	Kim Gevaert; Belgium	22.53	Manuela Levorato; Italy	22.75
400 metres	Olesya Zykina; Russia	50.45	Grit Breuer; Germany	50.70	Lee McConnell; Great Britain	51.02
800 metres	Jolanda Čeplak; Slovenia	1:57.65	Mayte Martínez; Spain	1:58.86	Kelly Holmes; Great Britain	1:59.83
1500 metres	Süreyya Ayhan; Turkey	3:58.79	Gabriela Szabo; Romania	3:58.81	Tatyana Tomashova; Russia	4:01.28
5000 metres	Marta Domínguez; Spain	15:14.76	Sonia O'Sullivan; Ireland	15:14.85	Yelena Zadorozhnaya; Russia	15:15.22
10,000 metres	Paula Radcliffe; Great Britain	30:01.09	Sonia O'Sullivan; Ireland	30:47.59 (NR)	Lyudmila Biktasheva; Russia	31:04.00
Marathon	Maria Guida; Italy	2:26:05	Luminita Zaituc; Germany	2:26:58	Sonja Oberem; Germany	2:28:45
100 metres hurdles	Glory Alozie; Spain	12.73	Olena Krasovska; Ukraine	12.88	Yana Kasova; Bulgaria	12.91
400 metres hurdles	Ionela Târlea; Romania	54.95	Heike Meißner; Germany	55.89	Anna Olichwierczuk; Poland	56.18
20 kilometres walk	Olimpiada Ivanova; Russia	1:26:42	Yelena Nikolayeva; Russia	1:28:20	Erica Alfridi; Italy	1:28:33
4 × 100 metres relay	Delphine Combe; Muriel Hurtis; Sylviane Félix; Odiah Sidibé; France	42.46	Melanie Paschke; Gabi Rockmeier; Sina Schielke; Marion Wagner; Germany	42.54	Natalya Ignatova; Yuliya Tabakova; Irina Khabarova; Larisa Kruglova; Russia	43.11
4 × 400 metres relay	Florence Ekpo-Umoh; Birgit Rockmeier; Claudia Marx; Grit Breuer; Germany	3:25.10	Natalya Antyukh; Natalya Nazarova; Anastasiya Kapachinskaya; Olesya Zykina; Russia	3:25.59	Zuzanna Radecka; Grażyna Prokopek; Małgorzata Pskit; Anna Olichwierczuk; Poland	3:26.15

=== Field ===
1994 | 1998 | 2002 | 2006 | 2010

Event	Gold		Silver		Bronze	
High jump	Kajsa Bergqvist; Sweden	1.98	Marina Kuptsova; Russia	1.92	Olga Kaliturina; Russia	1.89
Pole vault	Svetlana Feofanova; Russia	4.60	Yelena Isinbayeva; Russia	4.55	Yvonne Buschbaum; Germany	4.50
Long jump	Tatyana Kotova; Russia	6.85	Jade Johnson; Great Britain	6.73	Tünde Vaszi; Hungary	6.73
Triple jump	Ashia Hansen; Great Britain	15.00	Heli Koivula; Finland	14.83	Yelena Oleynikova; Russia	14.54
Shot put	Irina Korzhanenko; Russia	20.64	Vita Pavlysh; Ukraine	20.02	Svetlana Krivelyova; Russia	19.56
Discus throw	Ekaterini Voggoli; Greece	64.31	Natalya Sadova; Russia	64.12	Anastasia Kelesidou; Greece	63.92
Hammer throw	Olga Kuzenkova; Russia	72.94	Kamila Skolimowska; Poland	72.46	Manuela Montebrun; France	72.04
Javelin throw	Mirela Manjani; Greece	67.47	Steffi Nerius; Germany	64.09	Mikaela Ingberg; Finland	63.50
Heptathlon	Carolina Klüft; Sweden	6542	Sabine Braun; Germany	6434	Natallia Sazanovich; Belarus	6341

== Medal table ==
* Host nation (Germany)

Rank	Nation	Gold	Silver	Bronze	Total
1	Russia	7	9	8	24
2	Spain	6	3	6	15
3	Great Britain	5	2	5	12
4	France	4	1	2	7
5	Greece	4	0	2	6
6	Ukraine	3	3	1	7
7	Sweden	3	1	1	5
8	Germany*	2	9	8	19
9	Hungary	2	0	2	4
10	Poland	1	2	4	7
11	Finland	1	1	1	3
11	Portugal	1	1	1	3
13	Czech Republic	1	1	0	2
13	Denmark	1	1	0	2
13	Romania	1	1	0	2
16	Italy	1	0	3	4
17	Israel	1	0	0	1
17	Slovenia	1	0	0	1
17	Turkey	1	0	0	1
20	Belgium	0	2	0	2
20	Estonia	0	2	0	2
20	Ireland	0	2	0	2
23	Croatia	0	1	0	1
23	Latvia	0	1	0	1
23	Lithuania	0	1	0	1
23	Netherlands	0	1	0	1
23	Switzerland	0	1	0	1
28	Belarus	0	0	1	1
28	Bulgaria	0	0	1	1
Totals (29 entries)		46	46	46	138

== Participating nations ==
- Albania (6)
- Andorra (1)
- Armenia (1)
- Austria (14)
- Azerbaijan (2)
- Belarus (27)
- Belgium (18)
- Bosnia and Herzegovina (1)
- Bulgaria (13)
- Croatia (13)
- Cyprus (2)
- Czech Republic (40)
- Denmark (16)
- Estonia (14)
- Finland (49)
- France (66)
- Georgia (2)
- Germany (88)
- Gibraltar (1)
- Great Britain (60)
- Greece (51)
- Hungary (30)
- Iceland (3)
- Ireland (29)
- Israel (13)
- Italy (94)
- Latvia (16)
- Lithuania (13)
- Macedonia (1)
- Malta (2)
- Moldova (5)
- Monaco (1)
- Netherlands (30)
- Norway (17)
- Poland (55)
- Portugal (39)
- Romania (22)
- Russia (89)
- San Marino (1)
- Slovakia (17)
- Slovenia (22)
- Spain (70)
- Sweden (45)
- Switzerland (10)
- Turkey (8)
- Ukraine (37)
- Yugoslavia (9)

== Notes ==
Differences to competition format since the 1998 European Championships

New event added:

Women's 20 km walk replaces the 10 km walk.
