= 2003 World Championships in Athletics – Men's 4 × 400 metres relay =

These are the official results of the Men's 4 × 400 metres event at the 2003 IAAF World Championships in Paris, France. Their final was held on Sunday 31 August 2003 at 19:35h.

== Final ==
RANK	NATION	ATHLETES	TIME
	France (FRA)	• Leslie Djhone • Naman Keïta • Stéphane Diagana • Marc Raquil	2:58.96
	Jamaica (JAM)	• Brandon Simpson • Danny McFarlane • Davian Clarke • Michael Blackwood	2:59.60
	Bahamas (BAH)	• Avard Moncur • Dennis Darling • Nathaniel McKinney • Chris Brown	3:00.53
4.	Great Britain (GBR)	• Ian Mackie • Sean Baldock • Christopher Rawlinson • Daniel Caines	3:01.00
5.	Spain (ESP)	• Eduardo Iván Rodríguez • David Canal • Salvador Rodríguez • Antonio Manuel Reina	3:02.50
6.	Greece (GRE)	• Stilianos Dimotsios • Anastasios Gousis • Panagiotis Sarris • Periklis Iakovakis	3:02.56
7.	Japan (JPN)	• Yuki Yamaguchi • Takahiko Yamamura • Kenji Tabata • Mitsuhiro Sato	3:03.15
—	United States (USA)	• Calvin Harrison • Tyree Washington • Derrick Brew • Jerome Young	DQ

== Heats ==
- Held on Saturday 30 August 2003

=== Heat 1 ===
RANK	NATION	ATHLETES	TIME
1.	Bahamas (BAH)	• Avard Moncur • Nathaniel McKinney • Carl Oliver • Chris Brown	3:01.33
2.	Spain (ESP)	• Eduardo Iván Rodríguez • David Canal • Salvador Rodríguez • Antonio Manuel Reina	3:02.26
3.	Australia (AUS)	• John Steffensen • Clinton Hill • Paul Pearce • Mark Ormrod	3:02.89
4.	Germany (GER)	• Ingo Schultz • Sebastian Gatzka • Ruwen Faller • Bastian Swillims	3:04.72
—	Saudi Arabia (KSA)	• Hamed Hamadan Al-Bishi • Hadi Soua'an Al-Somaily • Mohammed Al-Salhi • Hamdan Odha Al-Bishi	DQ
—	United States (USA)	• Calvin Harrison • Mitch Potter • Adam Steele • Derrick Brew	DQ
—	Belarus (BLR)	• Aleksandr Yelistratov • Evgeny Mikheiko • Leanid Vershinin • Sergey Kozlov	DQ

=== Heat 2 ===
RANK	NATION	ATHLETES	TIME
1.	Jamaica (JAM)	• Michael Campbell • Brandon Simpson • Lanceford Spence • Davian Clarke	3:01.37
2.	Greece (GRE)	• Stilianos Dimotsios • Anastasios Gousis • Panagiotis Sarris • Periklis Iakovakis	3:02.31
3.	Japan (JPN)	• Yuki Yamaguchi • Takahiko Yamamura • Jun Osakada • Mitsuhiro Sato	3:02.35
4.	Canada (CAN)	• Tyler Christopher • Shane Niemi • Gary Reed • Keston Nelson	3:02.97
5.	Romania (ROU)	• Florin Suciu • Alexandru Mardan • Alexandru Cristea • Ioan Lucian Vieru	3:06.42
6.	Botswana (BOT)	• Oganebitse Moseki • Johnson Kubisa • Kagiso Kilego • Gaolesiela Salang	3:07.91
—	Nigeria (NGR)	• Musa Audu • Bolaji Lawal • James Godday • Abayomi Agunbiade	DQ

=== Heat 3 ===
RANK	NATION	ATHLETES	TIME
1.	France (FRA)	• Ahmed Douhou • Naman Keïta • Stéphane Diagana • Marc Raquil	3:01.79
2.	Great Britain (GBR)	• Timothy Benjamin • Sean Baldock • Ian Mackie • Daniel Caines	3:02.22
3.	South Africa (RSA)	• Marcus La Grange • Ockert Cilliers • Alwyn Myburgh • Paul Gorries	3:03.05
4.	Russia (RUS)	• Anton Galkin • Aleksandr Usov • Andrey Rudnitskiy • Ruslan Mashchenko	3:03.62
5.	Ireland (IRL)	• Paul McKee • Gary Ryan • David McCarthy • David Gillick	3:04.31
—	Dominican Republic (DOM)	• Arismendy Peguero • Carlos Santa • José Peralta • Félix Sánchez	DQ
—	Kenya (KEN)	• Vincent Mumo Kiilu • Joseph Mwengi Mutua • Victor Kibet • Ezra Sambu	DQ
—	Sri Lanka (SRI)	• Prasanna Sampath Amarasekara • Rohan Pradeep Kumara • Ranga Wimalawansa • Sugath Thilakaratne	DQ
