= Athletics at the 2006 Commonwealth Games – Men's 4 × 400 metres relay =

Men's 4 × 400 metres relay at the Commonwealth Games

The men's 4 × 400 metres relay event at the 2006 Commonwealth Games was held on March 24–25.

== Medalists ==
Gold	Silver	Bronze
Australia; John Steffensen; Chris Troode; Mark Ormrod; Clinton Hill; Sean Wroe*	South Africa; Jan van der Merwe; Ofentse Mogawane; Paul Gorries; LJ van Zyl; Ruben Makola*	Jamaica; Lancford Davis; Davian Clarke; Lansford Spence; Jermaine Gonzales; Ian Weakley*

== Results ==
=== Heats ===
Qualification: First 3 teams of each heat (Q) plus the next 2 fastest (q) qualified for the final.

Rank	Heat	Nation	Athletes	Time	Notes
1	2	Australia	Chris Troode, Sean Wroe, Mark Ormrod, Clinton Hill	3:03.04	Q
2	2	England	Andrew Steele, Martyn Rooney, Matthew Douglas, Robert Tobin	3:03.91	Q
3	1	Bahamas	Dennis Darling, Dominic Demeritte, Timothy Munnings, Avard Moncur	3:03.96	Q
4	1	Trinidad and Tobago	Damion Barry, Julieon Raeburn, Sherridan Kirk, Ato Modibo	3:04.14	Q
5	2	Nigeria	Bola Lawal, Musa Audu, Saul Welgopwa, James Godday	3:04.18	Q
6	1	South Africa	Jan van der Merwe, Ofentse Mogawane, Ruben Makola, Paul Gorries	3:04.24	Q
7	2	Jamaica	Lancford Davis, Lansford Spence, Ian Weakley, Davian Clarke	3:05.14	q
8	2	Sri Lanka	Rohan Kumara, Rohitha Pushpakumara, Shiwantha Weerasuriya, Prasanna Amarasekara	3:06.96	q
9	2	Fiji	Waisea Finau, Navitalai Naivalu, Iliesa Namosimalua, Niko Verekauta	3:07.73	
10	1	Kenya	Julius Kirwa, Vincent Kiilu, Selesio Njiru Mugo, Wambua Musembi	3:08.07	
11	1	Mauritius	Jean Degrace, Fernando Augustin, Eric Milazar, Ommanandsing Kowlessur	3:08.19	
	2	Botswana	Oganeditse Moseki, Gakologelwang Masheto, Obakeng Ngigwa, Johnson Kubisa	DQ	
	1	Sierra Leone	Hassan Fullah, Albert Kobba, Samuel Randall, Sandy Walker	DNS	
	1	Wales	Matt Elias, Dai Greene, Christian Malcolm, Iwan Thomas	DNS	

=== Final ===
Rank	Nation	Athletes	Time	Notes
1st place, gold medalist(s)	Australia	John Steffensen, Chris Troode, Mark Ormrod, Clinton Hill	3:00.93	
2nd place, silver medalist(s)	South Africa	Jan van der Merwe, Ofentse Mogawane, Paul Gorries, LJ van Zyl	3:01.84	
3rd place, bronze medalist(s)	Jamaica	Lancford Davis, Davian Clarke, Lansford Spence, Jermaine Gonzales	3:01.94	
4	England	Andrew Steele, Robert Tobin, Marlon Devonish, Martyn Rooney	3:02.01	
5	Nigeria	Bola Lawal, James Godday, Saul Welgopwa, Enefiok Udo-Obong	3:02.16	
6	Sri Lanka	Rohan Kumara, Rohitha Pushpakumara, Shiwantha Weerasuriya, Prasanna Amarasekara	3:06.42	
	Trinidad and Tobago	Damion Barry, Julieon Raeburn, Sherridan Kirk, Ato Modibo	DQ	
	Bahamas	Dennis Darling, Avard Moncur, Dominic Demeritte, Chris Brown	DNF	
