= 2005 World Championships in Athletics – Men's 4 × 400 metres relay =

The 4 × 400 metre relay at the 2005 World Championships in Athletics was held at the Helsinki Olympic Stadium on August 13 and August 14.

== Medals ==
Gold:	Silver:	Bronze:
United States Andrew Rock; Derrick Brew; Darold Williamson; Jeremy Wariner; Miles Smith*; LaShawn Merritt*: *Received Medal For Running in Prelim	Bahamas Nathaniel McKinney; Avard Moncur; Andrae Williams; Chris Brown	Jamaica Sanjay Ayre; Brandon Simpson; Lansford Spence; Davian Clarke

== Qualifying ==
From the initial two heats the first three teams in each plus two fastest losers progressed through to the final.

All times shown are in seconds.

- Q denotes automatic qualification.
- q denotes fastest losers.
- DNS denotes did not start.
- DNF denotes did not finish.
- AR denotes area record.
- NR denotes national record.
- PB denotes personal best.
- SB denotes season's best.

=== Heat 1 ===
1. Bahamas (Nathaniel McKinney, Avard Moncur, Troy McIntosh, Andrae Williams) 2:59.73 Q (WL)
2. Jamaica (Michael Blackwood, Sanjay Ayre, Lansford Spence, Davian Clarke) 2:59.75 Q (SB)
3. Poland (Piotr Klimczak, Marcin Marciniszyn, Robert Maćkowiak, Rafał Wieruszewski) 3:00.38 q (SB)
4. Germany (Simon Kirch, Kamghe Gaba, Florian Seitz, Bastian Swillims) 3:03.17
5. Sweden (Mattias Claesson, Jimisola Laursen, Johan Wissman, Thomas Nikitin) 3:03.62 (SB)
6. Botswana (Obakeng Ngwigwa, California Molefe, Tshepho Kelaotswe, Masheto Gakologelwang) 3:06.39 (SB)

=== Heat 2 ===
1. United States (Miles Smith, Derrick Brew, LaShawn Merritt, Darold Williamson) 3:00.48 Q (SB)
2. Trinidad and Tobago (Ato Modibo, Julieon Raeburn, Renny Quow, Damion Barry) 3:01.91 Q
3. Russia (Dmitriy Forshev, Andrey Rudnitskiy, Andrey Polukeyev, Yevgeniy Lebedev) 3:02.05 q (SB)
4. Ukraine (Oleksiy Rachkovsky, Andriy Tverdostup, Myhaylo Knysh, Vitaliy Dubonosov) 3:03.41 (SB)
5. Spain (David Testa, David Canal, David Melo, Antonio Manuel Reina) 3:08.03
6. Zimbabwe (Nelton Ndebele, Young Talkmore Nyongani, Brian Dzingai, Temba Ncube) 3:08.26 (SB)
- Japan (Yuzo Kanemaru, Kenji Narisako, Yoshihiro Horigome, Mitsuhiro Sato) DQ

=== Heat 3 ===
1. Great Britain (Robert Tobin, Martyn Rooney, Malachi Davis, Graham Hedman) 3:01.95 Q
2. France (Leslie Djhone, Naman Keïta, Abderrahim El Haouzy, Marc Raquil) 3:02.86 Q
3. Dominican Republic (Arismendi Peguero, Carlos Santa, Danis García, Antonio Side) 3:03.57 (SB)
4. South Africa (Jan van der Merwe, Ockert Cilliers, Pieter de Villiers, L. J. van Zyl) 3:04.64 (SB)
5. Nigeria (Saul Weigopwa, Musa Audu, Bolaji Lawal, Enefiok Udo Obong) 3:07.91 (SB)
- Saudi Arabia (Hamdan Odha Al-Bishi, Hadi Soua'an Al-Somaily, Hamed Hamadan Al-Bishi, Mohammed Al Salhi) DQ

=== Final ===
1. United States (Andrew Rock, Derrick Brew, Darold Williamson, Jeremy Wariner) 2:56.91 (WL)
2. Bahamas (Nathaniel McKinney, Avard Moncur, Andrae Williams, Chris Brown) 2:57.32 (NR)
3. Jamaica (Sanjay Ayre, Brandon Simpson, Lansford Spence, Davian Clarke) 2:58.07 (SB)
4. Great Britain (Timothy Benjamin, Martyn Rooney, Robert Tobin, Malachi Davis) 2:58.82 (SB)
5. Poland (Marcin Marciniszyn, Robert Maćkowiak, Piotr Rysiukiewicz, Piotr Klimczak) 3:00.58
6. France (Leslie Djhone, Naman Keïta, Abderrahim El Haouzy, Marc Raquil) 3:03.10
7. Russia (Dmitriy Forshev, Andrey Rudnitskiy, Oleg Mishukov, Yevgeniy Lebedev) 3:03.20
- Trinidad and Tobago (Ato Modibo, Julieon Raeburn, Renny Quow, Damion Barry) DQ
