= Athletics at the 2003 All-Africa Games – Men's 400 metres =

The men's 400 metres at the 2003 All-Africa Games were held on October 11–13.

== Medalists ==
Gold	Silver	Bronze
Ezra Sambu; Kenya	Nagmeldin Ali Abubakr; Sudan	Sofiane Labidi; Tunisia

== Results ==
=== Heats ===
Qualification: First 4 of each heat (Q) and the next 4 fastest (q) qualified for the semifinals.

Rank	Heat	Name	Nationality	Time	Notes
1	4	Lloyd Zvasiya	Zimbabwe	45.70	Q
2	4	Nagmeldin Ali Abubakr	Sudan	45.89	Q
3	2	Vincent Mumo	Kenya	46.28	Q
4	4	California Molefe	Botswana	46.31	Q
5	2	Musa Audu	Nigeria	46.37	Q
6	1	Johnson Kubisa	Botswana	46.54	Q
7	5	Ezra Sambu	Kenya	46.67	Q
8	3	Amin Badany Goma'a	Egypt	46.87	Q
9	2	Seydina Doucouré	Senegal	46.92	Q
10	1	Saul Weigopwa	Nigeria	47.09	Q
10	3	Sofiane Labidi	Tunisia	47.09	Q
12	5	Young Talkmore Nyongani	Zimbabwe	47.15	Q
13	3	Jeffrey Wilson	Zimbabwe	47.20	Q
14	4	James Godday	Nigeria	47.31	Q
15	2	Fernando Augustin	Mauritius	47.43	Q
16	3	Saliou Mbaye	Senegal	47.59	Q
17	5	Alemayehu Abebo	Ethiopia	47.82	Q
18	1	Hassan Fullah	Sierra Leone	47.91	Q
18	5	Kapena Rukero	Namibia	47.91	Q
20	4	Narcisse Tévoédjre	Benin	47.93	q
21	5	Albert Kobba	Sierra Leone	48.09	q
22	1	Brian Veron	Liberia	48.43	Q
23	3	Oumar Bella Bah	Guinea	48.50	q
24	4	Amadou Bocoum	Mali	48.80	q
25	2	Youba Hmeida	Mauritania	48.92	
26	3	Samuel Kiazolu	Liberia	49.17	
27	2	Mohamed Abdel Wahid	Sudan	49.28	
28	2	Varney Saidi	Liberia	49.32	
29	1	Moses Kondowe	Malawi	49.71	
30	4	David Aruna	Sierra Leone	50.12	
31	5	Ghirmay Tikabo	Eritrea	50.54	
32	1	Kitenge Fibel	Democratic Republic of the Congo	50.56	
33	4	Edgar Mbakouo Tsambi	Republic of the Congo	51.48	
	1	Fredrerick Kimou	Ivory Coast	DNS	
	5	Arlindo Leocadio Pinheiro	São Tomé and Príncipe	DNS	

=== Semifinals ===
Qualification: First 2 of each semifinal (Q) and the next 2 fastest (q) qualified for the final.

Rank	Heat	Name	Nationality	Time	Notes
1	2	Lloyd Zvasiya	Zimbabwe	45.51	Q
2	3	Sofiane Labidi	Tunisia	45.58	Q
3	3	Ezra Sambu	Kenya	45.65	Q
4	1	Nagmeldin Ali Abubakr	Sudan	45.93	Q
5	1	Vincent Mumo	Kenya	46.20	Q
6	2	California Molefe	Botswana	46.24	Q
7	3	Johnson Kubisa	Botswana	46.38	q
8	1	Musa Audu	Nigeria	46.52	q
9	2	Saul Weigopwa	Nigeria	46.70	
10	3	James Godday	Nigeria	46.71	
11	1	Jeffrey Wilson	Zimbabwe	47.00	
12	2	Amin Badany Goma'a	Egypt	47.15	
13	2	Saliou Mbaye	Senegal	47.20	
14	2	Fernando Augustin	Mauritius	47.30	
15	3	Young Talkmore Nyongani	Zimbabwe	47.45	
16	3	Narcisse Tévoédjre	Benin	47.76	
17	1	Seydina Doucouré	Senegal	47.96	
18	3	Hassan Fullah	Sierra Leone	48.30	
19	1	Alemayehu Abebo	Ethiopia	48.35	
20	1	Kapena Rukero	Namibia	48.62	
21	2	Albert Kobba	Sierra Leone	48.85	
22	1	Amadou Bocoum	Mali	48.97	
23	3	Oumar Bella Bah	Guinea	49.07	
24	2	Brian Veron	Liberia	49.29	

=== Final ===
Rank	Name	Nationality	Time	Notes
1st place, gold medalist(s)	Ezra Sambu	Kenya	44.98	
2nd place, silver medalist(s)	Nagmeldin Ali Abubakr	Sudan	45.22	
3rd place, bronze medalist(s)	Sofiane Labidi	Tunisia	45.42	
4	Vincent Mumo	Kenya	45.63	
5	Lloyd Zvasiya	Zimbabwe	45.97	
6	Musa Audu	Nigeria	45.98	
7	Johnson Kubisa	Botswana	46.03	
8	California Molefe	Botswana	47.09	
