= 2002 World Junior Championships in Athletics – Men's 4 × 400 metres relay =

The men's 4x400 metres relay event at the 2002 World Junior Championships in Athletics was held in Kingston, Jamaica, at National Stadium on 20 and 21 July.

== Medalists ==
| Gold | Kenneth Ferguson; Darold Williamson; Ashton Collins; Jonathan Fortenberry; United States |
| Silver | Sékou Clarke; Usain Bolt; Jermaine Myers; Jermaine Gonzales; Jamaica |
| Bronze | Fujio Yamauchi; Daisuke Sakai; Yuki Yamaguchi; Yosuke Inoue; Japan |

== Results ==
=== Final ===
21 July

| Rank | Nation | Competitors | Time | Notes |
|---|---|---|---|---|
| 1st place, gold medalist(s) | United States | Kenneth Ferguson; Darold Williamson; Ashton Collins; Jonathan Fortenberry | 3:03.71 | |
| 2nd place, silver medalist(s) | Jamaica | Sékou Clarke; Usain Bolt; Jermaine Myers; Jermaine Gonzales | 3:04.06 | |
| 3rd place, bronze medalist(s) | Japan | Fujio Yamauchi; Daisuke Sakai; Yuki Yamaguchi; Yosuke Inoue | 3:05.80 | |
| 4 | Poland | Miroslaw Sadej; Piotr Zrada; Daniel Mazurek; Piotr Kędzia | 3:06.25 | |
| 5 | France | Yohann Negre; Mohamed Atig; Brice Lagier; Brice Panel | 3:07.26 | |
| 6 | Australia | Courtney McLeod; Ryan Turton; Keith Sheehy; Stephen Landers | 3:09.67 | |
| 7 | Germany | Thomas Wilhelm; Christoph Helm; David Busch; Kamghe Gaba | 3:11.21 | |
| | South Africa | Shaine Morrison; Bonolo Maboa; Louis van Zyl; Leigh Julius | DQ | |

=== Heats ===
20 July

==== Heat 1 ====
| Rank | Nation | Competitors | Time | Notes |
|---|---|---|---|---|
| 1 | United States | Kenneth Ferguson; Darold Williamson; Bershawn Jackson; Jonathan Fortenberry | 3:03.56 | Q |
| 2 | Jamaica | Jermaine Myers; Sékou Clarke; Yhann Plummer; Jermaine Gonzales | 3:05.82 | Q |
| 3 | South Africa | Shaine Morrison; Bonolo Maboa; Leigh Julius; Louis van Zyl | 3:07.65 | q |
| 4 | Poland | Miroslaw Sadej; Piotr Kędzia; Daniel Mazurek; Piotr Zrada | 3:07.65 | q |
| 5 | Brazil | Luiz da Silva; Diego Venâncio; Luíz de Oliveira; Luís Ambrósio | 3:08.49 | |
| 6 | Morocco | Abdellatif El-Ghazaoui; Hicham Chliyeh; Ouadih Naciri; Mohamed Battani | 3:09.56 | |
| 7 | Ireland | David Gillick; Daniel Tobin; Liam McDermid; David McCarthy | 3:13.45 | |
| 8 | Bahamas | André Williams; Drameko Bridgewater; Andretti Bain; Michael Mathieu | 3:15.10 | |

==== Heat 2 ====
| Rank | Nation | Competitors | Time | Notes |
|---|---|---|---|---|
| 1 | Japan | Fujio Yamauchi; Daisuke Sakai; Yuki Yamaguchi; Yosuke Inoue | 3:07.35 | Q |
| 2 | France | Yohann Negre; Mohamed Atig; Brice Lagier; Brice Panel | 3:07.58 | Q |
| 3 | Germany | Stefan Wittl; Thomas Wilhelm; Christoph Helm; Kamghe Gaba | 3:08.06 | q |
| 4 | Australia | Courtney McLeod; Ryan Turton; Keith Sheehy; Stephen Landers | 3:08.22 | q |
| 5 | Canada | Ryan Therrien; Tyler Christopher; Nathan Vadeboncoeur; Erik Sproll | 3:10.40 | |
| 6 | Botswana | Paschalius Mahore; Gaolesiela Salang; Gakologelwang Masheto; Kagiso Kilego | 3:11.84 | |
| 7 | Spain | José María García; Marcos Muñoz; David Testa; Isaac Herrera | 3:12.61 | |

== Participation ==
According to an unofficial count, 63 athletes from 15 countries participated in the event.

- Australia (4)
- Bahamas (4)
- Botswana (4)
- Brazil (4)
- Canada (4)
- France (4)
- Germany (5)
- Ireland (4)
- Jamaica (5)
- Japan (4)
- Morocco (4)
- Poland (4)
- South Africa (4)
- Spain (4)
- United States (5)
