= 2004 African Championships in Athletics – Men's 4 × 400 metres relay =

The men's 4 × 400 metres relay event at the 2004 African Championships in Athletics was held in Brazzaville, Republic of the Congo on July 18.

== Results ==
Rank	Nation	Competitors	Time	Notes
1st place, gold medalist(s)	Zimbabwe	Lloyd Zvasiya, Lewis Banda, Temba Ncube, Talkmore Nyongani	3:02.38	
2nd place, silver medalist(s)	Nigeria	James Godday, Saul Weigopwa, Bola Lawal, Enefiok Udo-Obong	3:02.66	
3rd place, bronze medalist(s)	South Africa	Marcus la Grange, Werner Botha, Hendrick Mokganyetsi, Arnaud Malherbe	3:03.81	
4	Kenya	Vincent Mumo, Thomas Musembi, Sammy Rono, Ezra Sambu	3:04.00	
5	Botswana	Oganeditse Moseki, California Molefe, Johnson Kubisa, Gakologelwang Masheto	3:04.83	
6	Morocco	Abdellatif El Ghazaoui, Hamid Ben Hammou, Ismail Daif, Khalid Tighazouine	3:08.13	
7	Senegal	Seydina Doucouré, Ibou Faye, Oumar Loum, Abdoulaye Wagne	3:10.61	
	Republic of the Congo	Edgard Bakono Tsambi, Kelly Ebouaba, Arsen Amonad, Lezin Christian Elongo Ngoyikonda	DNF	
