= Athletics at the 2003 All-Africa Games – Men's 4 × 400 metres relay =

The men's 4 × 400 metres relay event at the 2003 All-Africa Games was held on October 15.

== Results ==
Rank	Nation	Athletes	Time	Notes
1st place, gold medalist(s)	Botswana	California Molefe, Kagiso Kilego, Oganeditse Moseki, Johnson Kubisa	3:02.24	NR
2nd place, silver medalist(s)	Nigeria	Abayomi Agunbiade, James Godday, Bolaji Lawal, Musa Audu	3:04.49	
3rd place, bronze medalist(s)	Zimbabwe	Crispen Mutakanyi, Godwin Tauya, Temba Ncube, Young Talkmore Nyongani	3:05.62	
4	Senegal	Seydina Doucouré, Saliou Mbaye, Ibou Faye, Cheikh Dramé	3:07.85	
5	Liberia	Samuel Kiazolu, Augustine Schmader, Varney Saidi, Charles Shaw	3:12.94	
6	Sierra Leone	David Aruna, Hassan Fullah, Alie Dadie Bangura, Albert Kobba	3:20.83	
7	Republic of the Congo	Arsène Amonad, Lezin Christian Elongo Ngoyikonda, Florac Elemba Owaka, Mbakouo Tsambi	3:25.07	
	Sudan		DNS	
