= 2006 African Championships in Athletics – Men's 400 metres =

The men's 400 metres event at the 2006 African Championships in Athletics was held at the Stade Germain Comarmond on August 9–11.

== Medalists ==
Gold	Silver	Bronze
Gary Kikaya; Democratic Republic of the Congo	Paul Gorries; South Africa	Talkmore Nyongani; Zimbabwe

== Results ==
=== Heats ===
Rank	Heat	Name	Nationality	Time	Notes
1	2	Lewis Banda	Zimbabwe	46.19	Q
2	2	California Molefe	Botswana	46.23	Q
3	1	Gary Kikaya	Democratic Republic of the Congo	46.27	Q
4	4	Talkmore Nyongani	Zimbabwe	46.42	Q
5	1	Paul Gorries	South Africa	46.52	Q
6	2	Ofentse Mogawane	South Africa	46.53	Q
7	3	Malik Louahla	Algeria	46.66	Q
8	3	George Kwoba	Kenya	46.71	Q
9	2	James Godday	Nigeria	46.83	q
10	1	Fernando Augustin	Mauritius	46.89	q
11	4	Sammy Rono	Kenya	46.93	Q
12	4	Gakologelwang Masheto	Botswana	46.95	Q
13	3	Eric Milazar	Mauritius	46.96	Q
14	1	Thomas Musembi	Kenya	46.97	q
15	1	Younés Belkaifa	Morocco	46.99	q
16	2	Ismail Daif	Morocco	47.06	q
17	4	Bobby Young	Liberia	47.27	
18	3	Obakeng Ngwigwa	Botswana	47.45	
19	3	Abeje Habtamu	Ethiopia	47.61	
20	3	Abdelkrim Khoudri	Morocco	47.69	
21	4	Mathieu Gnanligo	Benin	47.76	
22	3	Jan van der Merwe	South Africa	47.79	
23	1	Narcisse Tevoedjre	Benin	48.26	
23	4	Jean François Degrace	Mauritius	48.26	
25	2	Travis Hardy	Seychelles	50.62	
26	1	Stephen Moosoudee	Seychelles	50.71	
27	4	Etienne Gashagaza	Rwanda	52.07	
	1	Bawa Fuseini	Ghana	DNS	
	2	Bright Dzokoto	Ghana	DNS	
	2	Nagmeldin Ali Abubakr	Sudan	DNS	
	3	Daniel Mensah Kwei	Ghana	DNS	
	4	Saul Weigopwa	Nigeria	DNS	

=== Semifinals ===
Rank	Heat	Name	Nationality	Time	Notes
1	2	Gary Kikaya	Democratic Republic of the Congo	45.78	Q
2	2	Paul Gorries	South Africa	45.90	Q
3	1	Malik Louahla	Algeria	46.05	Q
4	1	Ofentse Mogawane	South Africa	46.11	Q
5	2	Talkmore Nyongani	Zimbabwe	46.17	Q
6	2	George Kwoba	Kenya	46.30	Q
7	1	James Godday	Nigeria	46.33	Q
8	1	Lewis Banda	Zimbabwe	46.35	Q
9	1	California Molefe	Botswana	46.39	
10	1	Sammy Rono	Kenya	46.79	
11	1	Eric Milazar	Mauritius	46.81	
12	2	Thomas Musembi	Kenya	46.93	
13	2	Gakologelwang Masheto	Botswana	47.30	
14	1	Ismail Daif	Morocco	47.35	
15	2	Fernando Augustin	Mauritius	47.67	
16	2	Younés Belkaifa	Morocco	47.80	

=== Final ===
Rank	Lane	Name	Nationality	Time	Notes
1st place, gold medalist(s)	3	Gary Kikaya	Democratic Republic of the Congo	45.03	
2nd place, silver medalist(s)	6	Paul Gorries	South Africa	45.56	
3rd place, bronze medalist(s)	7	Talkmore Nyongani	Zimbabwe	45.60	
4	4	Malik Louahla	Algeria	45.69	
5	2	James Godday	Nigeria	46.15	
6	5	Ofentse Mogawane	South Africa	46.44	
7	8	Lewis Banda	Zimbabwe	47.18	
8	1	George Kwoba	Kenya	47.66	
