= 2002 World Junior Championships in Athletics – Men's 400 metres =

The men's 400 metres event at the 2002 World Junior Championships in Athletics was held in Kingston, Jamaica, at National Stadium on 16, 17 and 18 July.

== Medalists ==
Gold	Darold Williamson; United States
Silver	Jonathan Fortenberry; United States
Bronze	Jermaine Gonzales; Jamaica

== Results ==
=== Final ===
18 July

Rank	Name	Nationality	Time	Notes
1st place, gold medalist(s)	Darold Williamson	United States	45.37	
2nd place, silver medalist(s)	Jonathan Fortenberry	United States	45.73	
3rd place, bronze medalist(s)	Jermaine Gonzales	Jamaica	45.84	
4	Young Talkmore Nyongani	Zimbabwe	45.93	
5	Luís Ambrósio	Brazil	46.08	
6	Wilan Louis	Barbados	46.33	
7	David McCarthy	Ireland	47.10	
	Piotr Zrada	Poland	DNF	

=== Semifinals ===
17 July

==== Semifinal 1 ====
Rank	Name	Nationality	Time	Notes
1	Young Talkmore Nyongani	Zimbabwe	46.15	Q
2	Jermaine Gonzales	Jamaica	46.17	Q
3	Piotr Zrada	Poland	46.47	q
4	David McCarthy	Ireland	46.77	q
5	Luis Luna	Venezuela	46.93	
6	Keith Sheehy	Australia	47.68	
	Robert Lathouwers	Netherlands	DQ	IAAF rule 163.3
	Mohamed Al-Mowallad	Saudi Arabia	DNF	

==== Semifinal 2 ====
Rank	Name	Nationality	Time	Notes
1	Jonathan Fortenberry	United States	46.16	Q
2	Wilan Louis	Barbados	46.26	Q
3	Florin Suciu	Romania	47.09	
4	Shaine Morrison	South Africa	47.52	
5	Diego Venâncio	Brazil	47.57	
6	Hicham Chliyeh	Morocco	47.66	
7	Kamghe Gaba	Germany	47.67	
8	Ryan Therrien	Canada	48.58	

==== Semifinal 3 ====
Rank	Name	Nationality	Time	Notes
1	Darold Williamson	United States	46.31	Q
2	Luís Ambrósio	Brazil	46.61	Q
3	Abdellatif El-Ghazaoui	Morocco	46.92	
4	Brice Panel	France	47.20	
5	Yhann Plummer	Jamaica	47.55	
6	Jacopo Marin	Italy	47.71	
7	Dimítrios Grávalos	Greece	47.83	
8	Courtney McLeod	Australia	48.24	

=== Heats ===
16 July

==== Heat 1 ====
Rank	Name	Nationality	Time	Notes
1	Wilan Louis	Barbados	46.46	Q
2	Abdellatif El-Ghazaoui	Morocco	46.68	Q
3	Luís Ambrósio	Brazil	46.79	Q
4	Luis Luna	Venezuela	46.96	Q
5	Yuki Yamaguchi	Japan	47.74	
6	Yohann Negre	France	48.19	
7	Didier Assoumou	Côte d'Ivoire	49.01	
8	Nathan Vadeboncoeur	Canada	49.32	

==== Heat 2 ====
Rank	Name	Nationality	Time	Notes
1	Darold Williamson	United States	46.72	Q
2	Kamghe Gaba	Germany	46.98	Q
3	David McCarthy	Ireland	47.07	Q
4	Jacopo Marin	Italy	47.23	Q
5	Mohamed Al-Mowallad	Saudi Arabia	47.41	q
6	Shaine Morrison	South Africa	47.72	q
7	Jamil James	Trinidad and Tobago	48.62	
	Yosuke Inoue	Japan	DQ	IAAF rule 163.3

==== Heat 3 ====
Rank	Name	Nationality	Time	Notes
1	Jermaine Gonzales	Jamaica	46.86	Q
2	Brice Panel	France	47.03	Q
3	Florin Suciu	Romania	47.06	Q
4	Dimítrios Grávalos	Greece	47.62	Q
5	Saul Weigopwa	Nigeria	47.86	
6	Andrés Silva	Uruguay	48.14	
7	David Testa	Spain	48.97	
8	Elio Gijon	Mexico	49.55	

==== Heat 4 ====
Rank	Name	Nationality	Time	Notes
1	Jonathan Fortenberry	United States	47.16	Q
2	Piotr Zrada	Poland	47.47	Q
3	Courtney McLeod	Australia	48.11	Q
4	Ryan Therrien	Canada	48.22	Q
5	Stefan Wittl	Germany	48.42	
6	John Valoyes	Colombia	48.46	
7	Evans Marie	Seychelles	48.54	
	Robert Tobin	United Kingdom	DNF	

==== Heat 5 ====
Rank	Name	Nationality	Time	Notes
1	Young Talkmore Nyongani	Zimbabwe	46.92	Q
2	Robert Lathouwers	Netherlands	47.24	Q
3	Diego Venâncio	Brazil	47.31	Q
4	Hicham Chliyeh	Morocco	47.39	Q
5	Keith Sheehy	Australia	47.42	q
6	Yhann Plummer	Jamaica	47.47	q
7	Said Al-Adhreai	Yemen	49.97	
	Tim Hawkes	New Zealand	DNF	

== Participation ==
According to an unofficial count, 40 athletes from 31 countries participated in the event.

- Australia (2)
- Barbados (1)
- Brazil (2)
- Canada (2)
- Colombia (1)
- Côte d'Ivoire (1)
- France (2)
- Germany (2)
- Greece (1)
- Ireland (1)
- Italy (1)
- Jamaica (2)
- Japan (2)
- Mexico (1)
- Morocco (2)
- Netherlands (1)
- New Zealand (1)
- Nigeria (1)
- Poland (1)
- Romania (1)
- Saudi Arabia (1)
- Seychelles (1)
- South Africa (1)
- Spain (1)
- Trinidad and Tobago (1)
- United Kingdom (1)
- United States (2)
- Uruguay (1)
- Venezuela (1)
- Yemen (1)
- Zimbabwe (1)
