= 2004 African Championships in Athletics – Men's 400 metres =

The men's 400 metres event at the 2004 African Championships in Athletics was held in Brazzaville, Republic of the Congo on July 14–16.

== Medalists ==
Gold	Silver	Bronze
Eric Milazar; Mauritius	Ezra Sambu; Kenya	Talkmore Nyongani; Zimbabwe

== Results ==
=== Heats ===
Rank	Heat	Name	Nationality	Time	Notes
1	1	Eric Milazar	Mauritius	46.15	Q
2	1	Arnaud Malherbe	South Africa	46.85	Q
3	1	Musa Audu	Nigeria	46.87	Q
4	1	Seydina Doucouré	Senegal	48.87	
1	2	Ezra Sambu	Kenya	46.00	Q
2	2	Abdellatif El Ghazaoui	Morocco	46.35	Q
3	2	Abayomi Agunbiade	Nigeria	47.13	Q
4	2	Daouda Diop	Senegal	48.33	
1	3	George Kwoba	Kenya	46.46	Q
2	3	Hendrick Mokganyetsi	South Africa	46.89	Q
3	3	Oganeditse Moseki	Botswana	46.95	Q
4	3	Soleiman Salem Ayed	Egypt	48.53	
5	3	Mathieu Gnanligo	Benin	48.72	
1	4	Marcus la Grange	South Africa	46.19	Q
2	4	Vincent Mumo	Kenya	46.57	Q
3	4	Cheik Dramé	Senegal	47.81	Q
1	5	Talkmore Nyongani	Zimbabwe	46.56	Q
2	5	Johnson Kubisa	Botswana	46.80	Q
3	5	Lezin Christian Elongo Ngoyikonda	Republic of the Congo	47.47	Q
4	5	Ismail Dail	Morocco	48.29	q
5	5	Amadou Bocoum	Mali	49.01	
6	5	Abdulla Hussein	Somalia	52.75	
	5	Fernando Augustin	Mauritius	DNF	

=== Semifinals ===
Rank	Heat	Name	Nationality	Time	Notes
1	1	Eric Milazar	Mauritius	45.35	Q
2	2	Ezra Sambu	Kenya	45.53	Q
3	1	Vincent Mumo	Kenya	45.62	Q
4	1	Marcus la Grange	South Africa	45.78	Q
5	2	Talkmore Nyongani	Zimbabwe	46.03	Q
6	1	George Kwoba	Kenya	46.22	Q
7	1	Musa Audu	Nigeria	46.71	
8	2	Abdellatif El Ghazaoui	Morocco	46.81	Q
9	1	Ismail Dail	Morocco	46.92	
10	2	Johnson Kubisa	Botswana	46.97	Q
11	2	Lezin Christian Elongo Ngoyikonda	Republic of the Congo	47.11	
12	2	Arnaud Malherbe	South Africa	47.20	
13	1	Oganeditse Moseki	Botswana	47.22	
14	1	Hendrick Mokganyetsi	South Africa	47.23	
15	2	Abayomi Agunbiade	Nigeria	47.24	
	2	Cheik Dramé	Senegal	DNS	

=== Final ===
Rank	Name	Nationality	Time	Notes
1st place, gold medalist(s)	Eric Milazar	Mauritius	45.03	
2nd place, silver medalist(s)	Ezra Sambu	Kenya	45.33	
3rd place, bronze medalist(s)	Talkmore Nyongani	Zimbabwe	45.69	
4	Vincent Mumo	Kenya	45.69	
5	Marcus la Grange	South Africa	45.74	
6	Abdellatif El Ghazaoui	Morocco	46.12	
7	Johnson Kubisa	Botswana	47.23	
8	George Kwoba	Kenya	47.59	
