= Athletics at the 2004 Summer Olympics – Men's 400 metres =

Men's 400 metres at the Games of the XXVIII Olympiad
- Olympic Athletics
- Venue: Athens Olympic Stadium
- Dates: 20–23 August
- Competitors: 62 from 48 nations
- Winning time: 44.00

Medalists
| 1st place, gold medalist(s) | | Jeremy Wariner | United States |
| 2nd place, silver medalist(s) | | Otis Harris | United States |
| 3rd place, bronze medalist(s) | | Derrick Brew | United States |

The men's 400 metres at the 2004 Summer Olympics as part of the athletics program were held at the Athens Olympic Stadium from August 20 to 23. Sixty-two athletes from 48 nations competed. The event was won by Jeremy Wariner of the United States, the sixth in what would ultimately be 7 consecutive American victories stretching from 1984 to 2008 and the 18th overall title in the event by the United States. The United States swept the podium for the 4th time in the event (1904, 1968, 1988).

== Summary ==
The first round had split a full roster of runners into eight heats with the first two gaining a direct qualification and then the next eight fastest across all heats advancing to the semifinals. The top two runners in each of the three semifinal heats moved on directly to the final, and they were immediately joined by the next two fastest from any of the semifinals.

At the start, Otis Harris, Jeremy Wariner, and Derrick Brew stormed out from the blocks to take a powerful lead over the rest of the field. Harris commanded the top position for the Americans throughout the race, but in the final turn he was chased down by Wariner. Slightly behind coming off the turn, Wariner stormed ahead over the last hundred metres to win the race at 44.00 seconds, the fastest time ever recorded in this event since American legend Michael Johnson won the gold in Sydney 2000. Harris held on to take the silver with Brew separating from the pack over the final straight to give the United States a sweep of the medal podium for the third time in the event's Olympic history, having previously managed at the 1968 Mexico City Olympics and the 1988 Seoul Olympics.

At the end of the final, seven sprinters managed to finish the race under 45 seconds, and five personal bests were recorded.

== Background ==
This was the 25th appearance of the event, which is one of 12 athletics events to have been held at every Summer Olympics. None of the finalists from 2000 returned; the only medalist from the 2003 world championships to compete was bronze winner Michael Blackwood of Jamaica. The American team of Jeremy Wariner, Otis Harris, and Derrick Brew was strong, even without two-time defending champion Michael Johnson, who had retired. Their top competition was Alleyne Francique of Grenada, the Central American and Caribbean champion and indoor champion.

Dominica, Guinea-Bissau, Slovenia, and Uruguay appeared in this event for the first time. The United States made its 24th appearance, most of any nation, having missed only the boycotted 1980 Games.

== Qualification ==
The qualification period for athletics was 1 January 2003 to 9 August 2004. For the men's 400 metres, each National Olympic Committee was permitted to enter up to three athletes that had run the race in 45.55 seconds or faster during the qualification period. If an NOC had no athletes that qualified under that standard, one athlete that had run the race in 45.95 seconds or faster could be entered.

== Competition format ==
In the first significant change in format since 1964, the competition was reduced from four rounds to three; it was the first time since 1912 that only three rounds were held. The "fastest loser" system, introduced in 1964, was used for the first round and semifinals (the first time it was used for semifinals, as the shift from four rounds to three meant that there were three semifinals instead of two). There were 8 first-round heats, each with 7 or 8 runners (before a withdrawal reduced one heat to 6). The top two runners in each heat advanced, along with the next eight fastest overall. The 24 semifinalists were divided into 3 heats of 8 runners each. The top two runners in each semifinal heat and the next two fastest overall advanced, making an eight-man final.

== Records ==
These were the standing world record, Olympic record, and world leading time (in seconds) prior to the 2004 Summer Olympics.

| World record | Michael Johnson (USA) | 43.18 s | Seville, Spain | 26 August 1999 |
| Olympic record | Michael Johnson (USA) | 43.49 s | Atlanta, United States | 5 August 1992 |
| World Leading | Jeremy Wariner (USA) | 44.37 s | Sacramento, United States | 15 July 2004 |

No world or Olympic records were set in this event.

The following national records were established during the competition:

| Nation | Athlete | Round | Time |
|---|---|---|---|
| India | K. M. Binu | Heat 5 | 45.48 |

== Schedule ==
Since 1984, all rounds have been held on separate days.

All times are Eastern European Summer Time (UTC+3)

| Date | Time | Round |
|---|---|---|
| Friday, 20 August 2004 | 21:10 | Round 1 |
| Saturday, 21 August 2004 | 21:15 | Semifinals |
| Monday, 23 August 2004 | 21:05 | Final |

== Results ==
=== Round 1 ===
Qualification rule: The top two finishers in each heat (Q) plus the next eight fastest overall runners (q) advanced to the semifinals.

==== Heat 1 ====
| Rank | Lane | Athlete | Nation | Time | Notes |
|---|---|---|---|---|---|
| 1 | 2 | Alleyne Francique | Grenada | 45.32 | Q |
| 2 | 5 | Davian Clarke | Jamaica | 45.54 | Q |
| 3 | 4 | Marcus La Grange | South Africa | 45.95 | |
| 4 | 3 | Piotr Klimczak | Poland | 46.23 | |
| 5 | 6 | Jun Osakada | Japan | 46.39 | |
| 6 | 7 | Lloyd Zvasiya | Zimbabwe | 47.19 | |
| 7 | 1 | David Canal | Spain | 47.23 | |
| 8 | 8 | Danilson Ricciuli | Guinea-Bissau | 49.27 | |

==== Heat 2 ====
| Rank | Lane | Athlete | Nation | Time | Notes |
|---|---|---|---|---|---|
| 1 | 1 | Chris Brown | Bahamas | 45.09 | Q, SB |
| 2 | 6 | Otis Harris | United States | 45.11 | Q |
| 3 | 5 | Eric Milazar | Mauritius | 45.34 | q |
| 4 | 8 | Casey Vincent | Australia | 46.09 | |
| 5 | 2 | Vincent Mumo Kiilu | Kenya | 46.31 | |
| 6 | 7 | Andrés Silva | Uruguay | 46.48 | |
| 7 | 4 | Stilianos Dimotsios | Greece | 46.51 | SB |
| 8 | 3 | Abdulla Mohamed Hussein | Somalia | 51.52 | |

==== Heat 3 ====
| Rank | Lane | Athlete | Nation | Time | Notes |
|---|---|---|---|---|---|
| 1 | 4 | Anton Galkin | Russia | 45.43 | Q |
| 2 | 2 | Yeimer López | Cuba | 45.44 | Q |
| 3 | 1 | Alejandro Cárdenas | Mexico | 45.46 | q |
| 4 | 5 | Gary Kikaya | Democratic Republic of the Congo | 45.57 | q |
| 5 | 3 | Ato Modibo | Trinidad and Tobago | 46.29 | |
| 6 | 7 | Mitsuhiro Sato | Japan | 46.70 | |
| 7 | 8 | Takeshi Fujiwara | El Salvador | 48.46 | |
| 8 | 6 | Youba Hmeida | Mauritania | 49.18 | |

==== Heat 4 ====
| Rank | Lane | Athlete | Nation | Time | Notes |
|---|---|---|---|---|---|
| 1 | 6 | Derrick Brew | United States | 45.41 | Q |
| 2 | 2 | Brandon Simpson | Jamaica | 45.61 | Q |
| 3 | 7 | Sofiane Labidi | Tunisia | 46.04 | |
| 4 | 5 | Daniel Caines | Great Britain | 46.15 | |
| 5 | 4 | Rohan Pradeep Kumara | Sri Lanka | 46.20 | |
| 6 | 3 | Evans Marie | Seychelles | 48.23 | PB |
| — | 8 | Lezin Ngoyikonda | Republic of the Congo | DNS | |

==== Heat 5 ====
| Rank | Lane | Athlete | Nation | Time | Notes |
|---|---|---|---|---|---|
| 1 | 8 | Carlos Santa | Dominican Republic | 45.31 | Q |
| 2 | 5 | Lewis Banda | Zimbabwe | 45.37 | Q |
| 3 | 3 | K. Mathews Binu | India | 45.48 | q, NR |
| 4 | 6 | Cédric van Branteghem | Belgium | 45.70 | q |
| 5 | 1 | California Molefe | Botswana | 45.88 | |
| 6 | 2 | Chris Lloyd | Dominica | 47.98 | |
| 7 | 4 | Fawzi Al-Shammari | Kuwait | 48.25 | |
| 8 | 7 | Saeed Al-Adhreai | Yemen | 49.39 | |

==== Heat 6 ====
| Rank | Lane | Athlete | Nation | Time | Notes |
|---|---|---|---|---|---|
| 1 | 8 | Jeremy Wariner | United States | 45.56 | Q |
| 2 | 5 | Ingo Schultz | Germany | 45.88 | Q |
| 3 | 1 | Young Talkmore Nyongani | Zimbabwe | 46.03 | |
| 4 | 4 | Zsolt Szeglet | Hungary | 46.16 | |
| 5 | 6 | Malachi Davis | Great Britain | 46.28 | |
| 6 | 7 | Oleg Mishukov | Russia | 46.41 | |
| 7 | 3 | Dadi Denis | Haiti | 47.57 | |
| — | 2 | Victor Kibet | Kenya | DNF | |

==== Heat 7 ====
| Rank | Lane | Athlete | Nation | Time | Notes |
|---|---|---|---|---|---|
| 1 | 8 | Michael Blackwood | Jamaica | 45.23 | Q |
| 2 | 7 | Hamdan Al-Bishi | Saudi Arabia | 45.31 | Q |
| 3 | 6 | Saul Weigopwa | Nigeria | 45.59 | q |
| 4 | 5 | Matija Šestak | Slovenia | 45.88 | q |
| 5 | 3 | Yuki Yamaguchi | Japan | 46.16 | |
| 6 | 1 | Nagmeldin Ali Abubakr | Sudan | 46.32 | |
| 7 | 2 | Muhammad Sajid Ahmad | Pakistan | 47.45 | SB |
| 8 | 4 | Moses Kamut | Vanuatu | 48.14 | SB |

==== Heat 8 ====
| Rank | Lane | Athlete | Nation | Time | Notes |
|---|---|---|---|---|---|
| 1 | 4 | Leslie Djhone | France | 45.40 | Q |
| 2 | 2 | Ezra Sambu | Kenya | 45.59 | Q |
| 3 | 3 | Timothy Benjamin | Great Britain | 45.69 | q |
| 4 | 5 | Clinton Hill | Australia | 45.89 | |
| 5 | 6 | Adem Hecini | Algeria | 46.50 | |
| 6 | 7 | Luis Luna | Venezuela | 47.92 | |
| 7 | 1 | Jonnie Lowe | Honduras | 48.06 | |
| 8 | 8 | Anderson Jorge dos Santos | Brazil | 48.77 | |

=== Semifinals ===
Qualification rule: The top two finishers in each heat (Q) plus the next two fastest overall runners (q) advanced to the final.

==== Semifinal 1 ====
| Rank | Lane | Athlete | Nation | Time | Notes |
|---|---|---|---|---|---|
| 1 | 3 | Jeremy Wariner | United States | 44.87 | Q |
| 2 | 5 | Michael Blackwood | Jamaica | 45.00 | Q |
| 3 | 6 | Leslie Djhone | France | 45.01 | q |
| 4 | 4 | Lewis Banda | Zimbabwe | 45.23 | |
| 5 | 2 | Eric Milazar | Mauritius | 45.23 | |
| 6 | 8 | Gary Kikaya | Democratic Republic of the Congo | 45.58 | |
| 7 | 1 | Ezra Sambu | Kenya | 45.84 | |
| 8 | 7 | Cédric van Branteghem | Belgium | 46.03 | |

==== Semifinal 2 ====
| Rank | Lane | Athlete | Nation | Time | Notes |
|---|---|---|---|---|---|
| 1 | 4 | Derrick Brew | United States | 45.05 | Q |
| 2 | 8 | Davian Clarke | Jamaica | 45.27 | Q |
| 3 | 5 | Chris Brown | Bahamas | 45.31 | |
| 4 | 6 | Yeimer López | Cuba | 45.52 | |
| 5 | 7 | Alejandro Cárdenas | Mexico | 45.64 | |
| 6 | 2 | K. Mathews Binu | India | 45.97 | |
| 7 | 1 | Matija Šestak | Slovenia | 46.54 | |
| — | 3 | Anton Galkin | Russia | ~~45.34~~ | DSQ |

==== Semifinal 3 ====
| Rank | Lane | Athlete | Nation | Time | Notes |
|---|---|---|---|---|---|
| 1 | 8 | Brandon Simpson | Jamaica | 44.97 | Q |
| 2 | 5 | Otis Harris | United States | 44.99 | Q |
| 3 | 6 | Alleyne Francique | Grenada | 45.08 | q |
| 4 | 4 | Carlos Santa | Dominican Republic | 45.58 | |
| 5 | 3 | Hamdan Al-Bishi | Saudi Arabia | 45.59 | |
| 6 | 2 | Saul Weigopwa | Nigeria | 45.67 | |
| 7 | 1 | Ingo Schultz | Germany | 46.23 | |
| 8 | 7 | Timothy Benjamin | Great Britain | 46.28 | |

=== Final ===
| Rank | Lane | Athlete | Nation | Time | Notes |
|---|---|---|---|---|---|
| 1st place, gold medalist(s) | 4 | Jeremy Wariner | United States | 44.00 | PB |
| 2nd place, silver medalist(s) | 5 | Otis Harris | United States | 44.16 | PB |
| 3rd place, bronze medalist(s) | 3 | Derrick Brew | United States | 44.42 | SB |
| 4 | 8 | Alleyne Francique | Grenada | 44.66 | |
| 5 | 6 | Brandon Simpson | Jamaica | 44.76 | PB |
| 6 | 7 | Davian Clarke | Jamaica | 44.83 | PB |
| 7 | 2 | Leslie Djhone | France | 44.94 | |
| 8 | 1 | Michael Blackwood | Jamaica | 45.55 | |
