= Athletics at the 2004 Summer Olympics – Men's 4 × 400 metres relay =

Men's 4 × 400 metres relay at the Games of the XXVIII Olympiad
- Olympic Athletics
- Venue: Athens Olympic Stadium
- Dates: 27–28 August
- Competitors: 68 from 16 nations
- Winning time: 2:55.91

Medalists
1st place, gold medalist(s)		United States; Otis Harris, Derrick Brew, Jeremy Wariner, Darold Williamson, Andrew Rock*, Kelly Willie*
2nd place, silver medalist(s)		Australia; John Steffensen, Mark Ormrod, Patrick Dwyer, Clinton Hill
3rd place, bronze medalist(s)		Nigeria; James Godday, Musa Audu, Saul Weigopwa, Enefiok Udo-Obong *Indicates the athlete only competed in the preliminary heats.

The men's 4 × 400 metres relay at the 2004 Summer Olympics as part of the athletics program was held at the Athens Olympic Stadium from August 27 to 28. The sixteen teams competed in a two-heat qualifying round in which the first three teams from each heat, together with the next two fastest teams, were given a place in the final race.

The American dominance in this relay event had become increasingly clear, having swept the medals in the 400 metres five days earlier. From an explosive start in the final, Otis Harris led off for the U.S. team and gave them a relentless lead over the rest of the field throughout the race. With no other team aiming to chase the Americans on the home stretch, the foursome of Harris, Derrick Brew, Olympic 400 metres champion Jeremy Wariner, and Darold Williamson stormed away to an effortless triumph in a time of 2:55.91, 4.69 seconds ahead of the silver-winning Aussie squad. As of 2023, this is the greatest winning margin in this relay at the Olympics. Meanwhile, the Nigerians stayed much closer with Japan and Great Britain on the final bend, until they outlasted the rivals in a desperately tight finish for the bronze.

The victory also helped the Americans compensate for the surprising runner-up finish of their team in the earlier sprint relay.

== Records ==
Prior to the competition, the existing World and Olympic records were as follows:

World record	United States (USA); Jerome Young; Antonio Pettigrew; Tyree Washington; Michael Johnson	2:54.20	Uniondale, United States	22 July 1998
Olympic record	United States; Andrew Valmon; Michael Johnson; Quincy Watts; Steve Lewis	2:55.74	Barcelona, Spain	8 August 1992

No new records were set during the competition.

== Qualification ==
The qualification period for athletics was 1 January 2003 to 9 August 2004. A National Olympic Committee (NOC) could enter one qualified relay team per relay event, with a maximum of six athletes. For this event, an NOC would be invited to participate with a relay team if the average of the team's two best times, obtained in IAAF-sanctioned meetings or tournaments, would be among the best sixteen, at the end of this period.

== Schedule ==
All times are Greece Standard Time (UTC+2)

Date	Time	Round
Friday, 27 August 2004	21:00	Round 1
Saturday, 28 August 2004	22:25	Final

== Results ==
=== Round 1 ===
Qualification rule: The first three teams in each heat (Q) plus the next two fastest overall (q) moved on to the final.

==== Heat 1 ====
Rank	Lane	Nation	Competitors	Time	Notes
1	6	Great Britain	Timothy Benjamin, Sean Baldock, Malachi Davis, Matthew Elias	3:02.40	Q, SB
2	5	Japan	Yuki Yamaguchi, Jun Osakada, Tomohiro Ito, Mitsuhiro Sato	3:02.71	Q
3	2	Germany	Ingo Schultz, Kamghe Gaba, Ruwen Faller, Bastian Swillims	3:02.77	Q
4	8	Australia	John Steffensen, Clinton Hill, Patrick Dwyer, Mark Ormrod	3:03.06	q
5	1	Botswana	Oganeditse Moseki, Johnson Kubisa, California Molefe, Kagiso Kilego	3:03.32	q, SB
6	7	Greece	Stilianos Dimotsios, Anastasios Gousis, Panagiotis Sarris, Periklis Iakovakis	3:04.27	SB
7	4	France	Ahmed Douhou, Ibrahima Wade, Abderrahim El Haouzy, Leslie Djhone	3:04.39	
	3	Jamaica	Michael Campbell, Michael Blackwood, Jermaine Gonzales, Davian Clarke	DSQ	

==== Heat 2 ====
Rank	Lane	Nation	Competitors	Time	Notes
1	6	United States	Kelly Willie, Derrick Brew, Andrew Rock, Darold Williamson	2:59.30	Q
2	3	Nigeria	James Godday, Musa Audu, Saul Weigopwa, Enefiok Udo-Obong	3:01.60	Q, SB
3	2	Bahamas	Andrae Williams, Dennis Darling, Nathaniel McKinney, Christopher Brown	3:01.74	Q, SB
4	5	Russia	Aleksandr Larin, Andrey Rudnitskiy, Oleg Mishukov, Ruslan Mashchenko	3:03.35	
5	8	Poland	Piotr Rysiukiewicz, Piotr Klimczak, Marcin Marciniszyn, Marek Plawgo	3:03.69	
6	4	Ukraine	Volodymyr Demchenko, Yevgeniy Zyukov, Myhaylo Knysh, Andriy Tverdostup	3:04.01	
7	7	Spain	Eduardo Iván Rodríguez, David Canal, Luis Flores, Antonio Manuel Reina	3:05.03	SB
	1	South Africa	Marcus La Grange, Hendrick Mokganyetsi, Ockert Cilliers, Arnaud Malherbe	DNF	

=== Final ===
Rank	Lane	Nation	Competitors	Time	Notes
1st place, gold medalist(s)	4	United States	Otis Harris, Derrick Brew, Jeremy Wariner, Darold Williamson	2:55.91	SB
2nd place, silver medalist(s)	1	Australia	John Steffensen, Mark Ormrod, Patrick Dwyer, Clinton Hill	3:00.60	SB
3rd place, bronze medalist(s)	3	Nigeria	James Godday, Musa Audu, Saul Weigopwa, Enefiok Udo-Obong	3:00.90	SB
4	6	Japan	Yuki Yamaguchi, Jun Osakada, Tomohiro Ito, Mitsuhiro Sato	3:00.99	SB
5	5	Great Britain	Timothy Benjamin, Sean Baldock, Malachi Davis, Matthew Elias	3:01.07	SB
6	7	Bahamas	Nathaniel McKinney, Aaron Cleare, Andrae Williams, Christopher Brown	3:01.88	
7	8	Germany	Ingo Schultz, Kamghe Gaba, Ruwen Faller, Bastian Swillims	3:02.22	
8	2	Botswana	Johnson Kubisa, California Molefe, Gaolesiela Salang, Kagiso Kilego	3:02.49	SB
