= Chris Troode =

Australian sprinter

Personal information
- Born: Christopher Troode; 19 February 1983 (age 43)

Sport
- Country: Australia
- Sport: Athletics
- Event: Sprinting
Medal record
Commonwealth Games
Gold medal – first place	2006 Melbourne	4 × 400 metres
Universiade
Gold medal – first place	2009 Belgrade	4 × 400 metres

Christopher Troode (born 19 February 1983) is an Australian former athlete.

A native of Perth, Troode was a member of Australia's gold medal-winning 4 × 400 metres relay team at the 2006 Commonwealth Games in Melbourne (with John Steffensen, Mark Ormrod & Clinton Hill). He was the only addition to the team which won silver at the 2004 Olympics and ran the second leg of the final.

In 2009, Troode won a 4 × 400 metres gold medal at the World University Games in Belgrade, where he also qualified fastest for the 400 metres individual final (but did not start).

Troode's wife Lyndsay was a sprinter at the 2014 Commonwealth Games and is the daughter of athlete Coleen Pekin.
