= Betances =

Betances is a surname. Notable people with the surname include:

- Dellin Betances (born 1988), American baseball player
- Juan Betances (born 1983), Dominican sprinter
- Ramón Emeterio Betances (1827–1898), Puerto Rican independence advocate and medical doctor
