= 2006 African Championships in Athletics – Men's 4 × 400 metres relay =

The men's 4 × 400 metres relay event at the 2006 African Championships in Athletics was held at the Stade Germain Comarmond on August 13.

== Results ==
Rank	Nation	Competitors	Time	Notes
1st place, gold medalist(s)	Kenya	George Kwoba, Vincent Mumo, Sammy Rono, Thomas Musembi	3:06.78	
2nd place, silver medalist(s)	South Africa	Alwyn Myburgh, Ofentse Mogawane, Ruben Majola, Paul Gorries	3:07.65	
3rd place, bronze medalist(s)	Botswana	Oganeditse Moseki, California Molefe, Gakologelwang Masheto, Obakeng Ngwigwa	3:08.13	
4	Mauritius	Ommanandsingh Kowlessur, Fernando Augustin, Jean François Degrace, Eric Milazar	3:09.78	
5	Liberia	O'Neil Wright, Saidu Varney, Marvin Lewis, Bobby Young	3:11.83	
6	Ghana	Bright Dzokoto, Bawa Fuseini, Emmanuel Simpson, Daniel Mensah Kwei	3:12.54	
7	Morocco	Abdelkrim Khoudri, Reda Aït Douida, Younés Belkaifa, Ismail Daif	3:13.25	
8	Seychelles	Nelson Renaud, Wallace Brutis, Stephen Moosoudee, Travis Hardy	3:27.15	
