= David Testa =

Spanish sprinter (born 1984)

Personal information
- Nationality: Spain
- Born: 9 August 1984 (age 42) Gijón, Spain
- Height: 1.84 m (6 ft 0 in)
- Weight: 74 kg (163 lb)

Sport
- Sport: Athletics
- Event: 400 metres
- Club: University of Oviedo

David Testa Alonso (born 9 August 1984 in Gijón) is a Spanish athlete specializing in the 400 metres.

== Competition record ==
Year	Competition	Venue	Position	Event	Notes
Representing Spain
2001	World Youth Championships	Debrecen, Hungary	11th (sf)	400 m	48.79
2002	World Junior Championships	Kingston, Jamaica	33rd (h)	400 m	48.97
2002	World Junior Championships	Kingston, Jamaica	13th (h)	4×400 m relay	3:12.61
2004	Ibero-American Championships	Huelva, Spain	9th (h)	400 m	46.87
2004	Ibero-American Championships	Huelva, Spain	1st	4×400 m relay	3:05.68
2005	Mediterranean Games	Almería, Spain	7th	400 m	46.97
2005	Mediterranean Games	Almería, Spain	1st	4×400 m relay	3:03.65
2005	European U23 Championships	Erfurt, Germany	6th	400 m	48.06
2005	World Championships	Helsinki, Finland	16th (h)	4×400 m relay	3:08.03
2006	World Indoor Championships	Moscow, Russia	7th (h)	4×400 m relay	3:08.07
2006	Ibero-American Championships	Ponce, Puerto Rico	3rd	400 m	46.46
2006	European Championships	Gothenburg, Sweden	30th (h)	400 m	47.29
2006	European Championships	Gothenburg, Sweden	8th	4×400 m relay	3:04.98
2007	European Indoor Championships	Birmingham, United Kingdom	11th (sf)	400 m	47.81
2012	World Indoor Championships	Istanbul, Turkey	5th	4×400 m relay	3:10.01
2012	European Championships	Helsinki, Finland	10th (h)	4×400 m relay	3:09.11

== Personal bests ==
Outdoor

- 400 metres – 46.35 (Almería 2005)

Indoor

- 400 metres – 47.07 (Birmingham 2007)
- 800 metres – 1:50.50 (Oviedo 2007)
