= 2002 World Junior Championships in Athletics – Men's javelin throw =

The men's javelin throw event at the 2002 World Junior Championships in Athletics was held in Kingston, Jamaica, at National Stadium on 19 and 21 July.

== Medalists ==
Gold	Igor Janik; Poland
Silver	Vladislav Shkurlatov; Russia
Bronze	Jung Sang-Jin; South Korea

== Results ==
=== Final ===
21 July

Rank	Name	Nationality	Attempts						Result	Notes
Rank	Name	Nationality	1	2	3	4	5	6	Result	Notes
1st place, gold medalist(s)	Igor Janik	Poland	74.16	69.46	67.63	69.68	69.69	x	74.16	
2nd place, silver medalist(s)	Vladislav Shkurlatov	Russia	69.99	68.41	70.31	69.26	71.85	74.09	74.09	
3rd place, bronze medalist(s)	Jung Sang-Jin	South Korea	73.99	x	67.04	73.13	72.98	x	73.99	
4	Jarrod Bannister	Australia	70.55	70.22	71.04	73.31	71.59	71.22	73.31	
5	Kalle Sillanpää	Finland	68.58	x	72.70	x	x	67.77	72.70	
6	Qin Qiang	China	70.62	67.43	71.80	70.37	70.04	72.29	72.29	
7	Teemu Wirkkala	Finland	70.06	68.00	65.75	70.98	x	69.98	70.98	
8	Kazuki Yamamoto	Japan	70.90	66.88	65.27	67.26	x	70.29	70.90	
9	Vítezslav Vesely	Czech Republic	x	64.44	68.76				68.76	
10	Yudel Moreno	Cuba	68.47	66.55	x				68.47	
11	Ludo van der Plaat	Netherlands	68.14	63.69	67.97				68.14	
12	Vladimir Petrichenko	Ukraine	63.95	67.38	x				67.38	

=== Qualifications ===
19 Jul

==== Group A ====
Rank	Name	Nationality	Attempts			Result	Notes
Rank	Name	Nationality	1	2	3	Result	Notes
1	Jung Sang-Jin	South Korea	73.31	-	-	73.31	Q
2	Kalle Sillanpää	Finland	68.63	70.63	-	70.63	Q
3	Vladislav Shkurlatov	Russia	69.18	66.38	70.62	70.62	Q
4	Qin Qiang	China	70.52	-	-	70.52	Q
5	Ludo van der Plaat	Netherlands	70.01	-	-	70.01	Q
6	Vladimir Petrichenko	Ukraine	66.64	x	68.41	68.41	q
7	Chou Yi-Chen	Chinese Taipei	65.02	67.68	66.77	67.68	
8	Bart Debacker	Belgium	63.31	64.55	65.30	65.30	
9	Sándor Nagy	Hungary	65.20	63.17	61.81	65.20	
10	Joshua Robinson	Australia	63.97	x	x	63.97	
11	Júlio de Oliveira	Brazil	62.71	x	63.72	63.72	
12	Alex van der Merwe	United Kingdom	x	59.89	56.13	59.89	
13	James Finneran	United States	x	58.05	59.09	59.09	
14	Rinat Tarzumanov	Uzbekistan	57.05	52.16	54.36	57.05	

==== Group B ====
Rank	Name	Nationality	Attempts			Result	Notes
Rank	Name	Nationality	1	2	3	Result	Notes
1	Igor Janik	Poland	73.84	-	-	73.84	Q
2	Jarrod Bannister	Australia	72.17	-	-	72.17	Q
3	Vítezslav Vesely	Czech Republic	71.59	-	-	71.59	Q
4	Teemu Wirkkala	Finland	68.26	68.01	71.50	71.50	Q
5	Yudel Moreno	Cuba	70.96	-	-	70.96	Q
6	Kazuki Yamamoto	Japan	69.85	x	65.84	69.85	q
7	Hamad Al-Khalifa	Qatar	68.22	67.77	66.24	68.22	
8	Yeóryios Ayiassótis	Greece	64.44	63.52	66.88	66.88	
9	Ciprian Morutan	Romania	62.37	62.40	65.33	65.33	
10	Jarrad Matthews	United States	64.94	61.75	58.25	64.94	
11	Magnus Arvidsson	Sweden	62.57	59.34	61.85	62.57	
12	Dayron Márquez	Colombia	x	58.57	60.25	60.25	
13	Csongor Olteán	Hungary	58.27	58.51	55.81	58.51	
14	Cédric Guinfolleau	France	57.17	56.31	57.62	57.62	
15	Fabian Morgan	Jamaica	50.56	49.29	54.85	54.85	

== Participation ==
According to an unofficial count, 29 athletes from 25 countries participated in the event.

- Australia (2)
- Belgium (1)
- Brazil (1)
- China (1)
- Chinese Taipei (1)
- Colombia (1)
- Cuba (1)
- Czech Republic (1)
- Finland (2)
- France (1)
- Greece (1)
- Hungary (2)
- Jamaica (1)
- Japan (1)
- Netherlands (1)
- Poland (1)
- Qatar (1)
- Romania (1)
- Russia (1)
- South Korea (1)
- Sweden (1)
- Ukraine (1)
- United Kingdom (1)
- United States (2)
- Uzbekistan (1)
