= Young Talkmore Nyongani =

Zimbabwean sprinter

Medal record

Men's athletics

Representing Zimbabwe

African Championships
Gold medal – first place	2004 Brazzaville	4×400 m
Bronze medal – third place	2004 Brazzaville	400 m
Bronze medal – third place	2006 Bambous	400 m

Young Talkmore Nyongani (born 2 September 1983) is a Zimbabwean sprinter who specializes in the 400 metres. His personal best time is 44.96 seconds, achieved in March 2005 in Pretoria. He carried the flag for Zimbabwe at the opening ceremony of the 2004 Summer Olympics.

Nyongani started running in his rural home of Makonde at Alaska mine near Chinhoyi before he was brought to the capital Harare by the Millennium Athletics Academy, which is one of Zimbabwe's school of athletics excellence. He then took part at the World Junior Championships in Jamaica. In 2003, Nyongani was awarded a scholarship and spent time in Dakar, Senegal.

== Competition record ==
Year	Competition	Venue	Position	Event	Notes
Representing Zimbabwe
2002	World Junior Championships	Kingston, Jamaica	4th	400 m	45.93
2002	Commonwealth Games	Manchester, United Kingdom	22nd (qf)	400 m	47.14
2002	Commonwealth Games	Manchester, United Kingdom	–	4 × 400 m relay	DQ
2002	African Championships	Radès, Tunisia	5th	200 m	21.16
2003	All-Africa Games	Abuja, Nigeria	15th (sf)	400 m	47.45
2003	All-Africa Games	Abuja, Nigeria	3rd	4 × 400 m relay	3:05.62
2004	African Championships	Brazzaville, Republic of the Congo	3rd	400 m	45.69
2004	African Championships	Brazzaville, Republic of the Congo	1st	4 × 400 m relay	3:02.38
2004	Olympic Games	Athens, Greece	28th (h)	400 m	46.03
2005	World Championships	Helsinki, Finland	20th (sf)	400 m	47.20
2005	World Championships	Helsinki, Finland	17th (h)	4 × 400 m relay	3:08.26
2006	African Championships	Bambous, Mauritius	3rd	400 m	45.60
2007	All-Africa Games	Algiers, Algeria	2nd	400 m	45.76
2007	All-Africa Games	Algiers, Algeria	3rd	4 × 400 m relay	3:04.84
2007	World Championships	Osaka, Japan	23rd (h)	400 m	46.23
2008	Olympic Games	Beijing, China	30th (h)	400 m	45.89
2009	World Championships	Berlin, Germany	26th (h)	400 m	45.92
