= Aleksandr Usov =

Aleksandr Usov may refer to:

- Aleksandr Usov (sprinter) (born 1976), Russian sprinter
- Alexandre Usov (born 1977), Belarusian racing cyclist
