= Forshev =

Forshev (masculine, Russian: Форшев) or Forsheva (feminine, Russian: Форшева) is a Russian surname. Notable people with the surname include:

- Dmitry Forshev (born 1976), Russian sprinter, husband of Olesya
- Olesya Forsheva (born 1979), Russian sprinter, wife of Dmitry
