= Tomohiro Ito =

Japanese sprinter (born 1982)

Tomohiro Ito (伊藤 友広, Itō Tomohiro) (born 16 August 1982) is a Japanese sprinter who specializes in the 400 metres.

He finished fourth in 4 × 400 m relay at the 2004 Olympic Games, together with teammates Yuki Yamaguchi, Jun Osakada and Mitsuhiro Sato.

His personal best time is 45.63 seconds, achieved in October 2003 in Fukuroi.
