= Yudel Moreno =

Cuban javelin thrower

Personal information
- Full name: Yudel Moreno Hernández
- Born: 24 February 1983 (age 43) Cienfuegos, Cienfuegos
- Height: 1.83 m (6 ft 0 in)
- Weight: 83 kg (183 lb)

Sport
- Country: Cuba
- Sport: Athletics
Medal record
Men's Athletics
Representing Cuba
CAC Junior Championships (U20)
Gold medal – first place	2002 Bridgetown	Javelin throw
- Updated on 22 June 2013

Yudel Moreno Hernández (born 24 February 1983) is a Cuban javelin thrower. His personal best throw is 80.19 metres, achieved on 31 May 2006 in Valencia, Venezuela.

== Career ==
He was born in Cienfuegos. He won the silver medal at the 2005 Central American and Caribbean Championships and at the 2006 Central American and Caribbean Games.

== Achievements ==
Year	Competition	Venue	Position	Event	Notes
Representing Cuba
2002	Central American and Caribbean Junior Championships (U-20)	Bridgetown, Barbados	1st	Javelin	67.59 m
2002	World Junior Championships	Kingston, Jamaica	10th	Javelin	68.47 m
2005	ALBA Games	La Habana, Cuba	3rd	Javelin	77.97 m
2005	Central American and Caribbean Championships	Nassau, Bahamas	2nd	Javelin	73.95 m
2006	Central American and Caribbean Games	Cartagena, Colombia	2nd	Javelin	78.44 m
2009	ALBA Games	La Habana, Cuba	3rd	Javelin	69.28 m
2009	Central American and Caribbean Championships	La Habana, Cuba	4th	Javelin	70.16 m
