= 2012 African Championships in Athletics – Men's 4 × 400 metres relay =

The men's 4 x 400 metres relay at the 2012 African Championships in Athletics was held at the Stade Charles de Gaulle on 1 July.

== Medalists ==
Gold	Saul Weigopwa, Amaechi Morton; Abiola Onakoya, Isah Salihu; Nigeria
Silver	PC Beneke, Ofentse Mogawane; Oscar Pistorius, Willem de Beer; South Africa
Bronze	Vincent Kiplangat Koskei, Vincent Mumo Kiilu; Boniface Mucheru, Mark Mutai; Kenya

== Records ==
Standing records prior to the 2012 African Championships in Athletics
World record	United States; Andrew Valmon, Quincy Watts; Butch Reynolds, Michael Johnson	2:54.29	Stuttgart, Germany	22 August 1993
African record	Nigeria; Clement Chukwu, Jude Monye; Sunday Bada, Enefiok Udo-Obong	2:58.68	Sydney, Australia	30 September 2000
Championship record	Kenya; Julius Sang, Tito Sawe; Alfred Nyambane, David Kitur	3:01.86	Cairo, Egypt	18 August 1985

== Schedule ==
Date	Time	Round
1 July 2012	17:30	Final

== Results ==
=== Final ===
Rank	Lane	Nation	Athletes	Time	Notes
1st place, gold medalist(s)	8	Nigeria	Saul Weigopwa, Amaechi Morton, Abiola Onakoya, Isah Salihu	3:02.39	
2nd place, silver medalist(s)	6	South Africa	PC Beneke, Ofentse Mogawane, Oscar Pistorius, Willem de Beer	3:04.01	
3rd place, bronze medalist(s)	1	Kenya	Vincent Kiplangat Koskei, Vincent Kiilu Mumo, Boniface Mucheru, Mark Mutai	3:04.12	
4	7	Ghana	Nicholas Fordjour, Keith Nkrumah, Lumax Selasi, Daniel Gyasi	3:10.43	
5	4	Niger	Abdoul Razack Robo Samma, Jacouba Boubacar Soumana, Salifou Bumarou, Mohamedine Mahamadou	3:15.54	
6	5	Benin	Narcisse Tevoedjre, Adam Yarou, Seigneur Blais de Campos, Yaovi Michael Gougou	3:16.28	
	2	Ethiopia	Hago Tadesse, Solomon Hailu, Gebril Galcha, Bereket Desta	DSQ	
	3	Botswana	Isaac Makwala, Obakeng Ngwigwa, Nigel Amos, Omphemetse Mokgadi	DSQ	
