= Lloyd Zvasiya =

Zimbabwean sprinter

Medal record

Men's athletics

Representing Zimbabwe

African Championships
Gold medal – first place	2004 Brazzaville	4×400 m

Lloyd Zvasiya (born 28 May 1981) is a retired Zimbabwean sprinter who specialised in the 400 metres. He competed at the 2004 Summer Olympics without reaching the semifinals.

His personal best in the event is 45.51 from 2003.

== Competition record ==
Year	Competition	Venue	Position	Event	Notes
Representing Zimbabwe
1999	African Junior Championships	Tunis, Tunisia	7th	200 m	22.19
1999	African Junior Championships	Tunis, Tunisia	6th	400 m	49.70
2003	All-Africa Games	Abuja, Nigeria	5th	400 m	45.97
2003	Afro-Asian Games	Hyderabad, India	7th	400 m	48.81
2004	World Indoor Championships	Budapest, Hungary	18th (h)	400 m	47.81
2004	African Championships	Brazzaville, Republic of the Congo	1st	4 × 400 m relay	3:02.38
2004	Olympic Games	Athens, Greece	46th (h)	400 m	47.19
