= Paul Gorries =

South African sprinter (born 1981)

Medal record

Men's athletics

Representing South Africa

African Championships
Silver medal – second place	2006 Bambous	400 m
Silver medal – second place	2006 Bambous	4×400 m

Paul Gorries (born 28 February 1981 in Cape Town) is a South African retired sprinter and current coach of the national 4×100m relay team.

== Competition record ==
Year	Competition	Venue	Position	Event	Notes
Representing South Africa
1999	African Junior Championships	Tunis, Tunisia	1st	200 m	21.19
1999	African Junior Championships	Tunis, Tunisia	1st	4 × 100 m relay	41.42
1999	African Junior Championships	Tunis, Tunisia	1st	4 × 400 m relay	3:13.01
1999	World Championships	Seville, Spain	42nd (h)	200 m	20.94
1999	All-Africa Games	Johannesburg, South Africa	10th (sf)	200 m	20.76
2000	World Junior Championships	Santiago, Chile	1st	200 m	20.64 (wind: +1.3 m/s)
2003	World Championships	Paris, France	28th (h)	400 m	45.98
2003	World Championships	Paris, France	10th (h)	4 × 400 m relay	3:03.05
2006	Commonwealth Games	Melbourne, Australia	7th	400 m	45.79
2006	Commonwealth Games	Melbourne, Australia	2nd	4 × 400 m relay	3:01.84
2006	African Championships	Bambous, Mauritius	2nd	400 m	45.56
2006	African Championships	Bambous, Mauritius	2nd	4 × 400 m relay	3:07.65
2007	All-Africa Games	Algiers, Algeria	36th (h)	400 m	50.74
2007	All-Africa Games	Algiers, Algeria	8th	4 × 400 m relay	DNF

=== Personal bests ===
- 100 metres – 10.43 s (2000)
- 200 metres – 20.59 s (2000)
- 400 metres – 45.30 s (2003)
