= Danilson Ricciuli =

Danilson Ricciuli (born 17 August 1982) he is an athlete who competed for Guinea-Bissau at the 2004 Summer Olympic Games in the 400m, he finished 8th in his heat and failed to advance. He also competed at the 2003 World Championships in Athletics.
