= Muhammad Sajid Ahmad =

Pakistani sprinter (born 1980)

Personal information
- Nationality: Pakistani
- Born: 19 January 1980 (age 46)

Sport
- Sport: Sprinting
- Event: 400 metres

Muhammad Sajid Ahmad (born 19 January 1980) is a Pakistani sprinter. He competed in the men's 400 metres at the 2004 Summer Olympics.
