= Danis García =

Dominican Republic sprinter

Danis García (born 27 November 1976 in Santiago) is a sprinter from the Dominican Republic.

García finished fifth in 4 x 400 metres relay at the 2006 World Indoor Championships, together with teammates Arismendy Peguero, Juan Betances and Carlos Santa. He previously competed in this event at the 2005 World Championships without success.

His best season was in 2009 where he ran 100 meters in 10.94 seconds, scoring 904, and 200 meters in 21.45 seconds, scoring 1002.
