= Dadi Denis =

Haitian sprinter

Personal information
- Full name: Dadi Denis
- Nationality: Haiti
- Born: 13 August 1976 (age 49)
- Height: 1.85 m (6 ft 1 in)
- Weight: 78 kg (172 lb)

Sport
- Sport: Athletics
- Event: Sprint
- College team: Morgan State Bears
- Coached by: Neville Hodge

Achievements and titles
- Personal best: 400 m: 45.89 (2004)

Dadi Denis (born August 13, 1976) is a retired Haitian sprinter, who specialized in the 400 metres. Being born and raised in the United States, Denis represented his parental nation Haiti at the 2004 Summer Olympics, and was also a member of the track and field team for Morgan State Bears, in Baltimore, Maryland.

Denis qualified for the men's 400 metres at the 2004 Summer Olympics in Athens, by attaining a B-standard time of 45.89. He threw down a 47.57 in heat six, but faded only to seventh and did not advance further into the semifinals, trailing behind U.S. sprinter and eventual winner Jeremy Wariner.
