= Miles Smith (sprinter) =

American professional sprinter (born 1984)

Personal information
- Born: September 24, 1984 (age 41)

Achievements and titles
- National finals: 2005 USA Champs; • 400 m, 6th; 2009 USA Champs; • 400 m, 8th; 2011 USA Champs; • 400 m, 6th
Medal record
Men's athletics
Representing United States
World Championships in Athletics
Gold medal – first place	2005 Helsinki	4 × 400 m

Miles Smith (born September 24, 1984 in St. Louis, Missouri) is an American professional sprinter. By finishing sixth at the 2005 USATF Outdoor Championships in the 400 m, he was selected to represent the United States at the 2005 World Championships in Athletics in the 4 × 400 m, where he won a gold medal by virtue of running in the preliminary rounds.

Despite an unspectacular high school career, Smith was able to achieve success as a collegiate and professional athlete. His coach Joey Haines once said, "Miles thinks he's the best in the world. He thinks he can do anything."

In 2013, Smith began coaching sprinters at Southeast Missouri State University.

== Major international competitions ==
Year	Competition	Venue	Position	Event	Notes
2005	IAAF World Championships in Athletics	Helsinki, Finland	1st (Heat 2, Heats)	4 × 400 m	3:00.48
2005	DecaNation	Paris, France	4th	400 m	46.11
2011	Stockholm Bauhaus Athletics	Stockholm, Sweden	2nd (Race B)	400 m	45.68

== Domestic competitions ==
Year	Competition	Venue	Position	Event	Notes
2004	Kansas Relays	Lawrence, Kansas	1st (Race 1)	400 m	47.18
2005	NCAA Men's Division I Indoor Track and Field Championships	Fayetteville, Arkansas	4th (Heat 2, Heats)	400 m	46.99
2005	NCAA Men's Division I Outdoor Track and Field Championships	Sacramento, California	5th	400 m	45.16
2005	United States Championships	Carson, California	6th	400 m	45.25
2006	NCAA Men's Division I Indoor Track and Field Championships	Fayetteville, Arkansas	3rd (Race 1)	400 m	46.44
2006	NCAA Men's Division I Outdoor Track and Field Championships	Sacramento, California	6th (Heat 1, Semifinals)	400 m	45.92
2008	NCAA Men's Division I Indoor Track and Field Championships	Fayetteville, Arkansas	4th (Race 2)	400 m	46.46
2008	NCAA Men's Division I Outdoor Track and Field Championships	Des Moines, Iowa	6th	400 m	45.67
2008	United States Championships	Eugene, Oregon	6th (Heat 2, Semifinals)	400 m	46.32
2009	Drake Relays	Des Moines, Iowa	6th	400 m	47.12
2009	United States Championships	Eugene, Oregon	8th	400 m	46.09
2010	Drake Relays	Des Moines, Iowa	6th	400 m	46.46
2011	United States Championships	Eugene, Oregon	6th	400 m	45.34
2012	United States Olympic Trials	Eugene, Oregon	6th (Heat 2, Semifinals)	400 m	45.81
