= Derrick Brew =

American sprinter

Personal information
- Full name: Derrick Keith Brew
- Born: December 28, 1977 (age 48) Houston, Texas, U.S.

Achievements and titles
- Personal bests: 200 m: 20.42; 400 m: 44.29
Medal record
Men's athletics
Representing the United States
Olympic Games
Gold medal – first place	2004 Athens	4 × 400 m relay
Bronze medal – third place	2004 Athens	400 m
World Championships
Gold medal – first place	2005 Helsinki	4 × 400 m relay
Disqualified	2001 Edmonton	4 × 400 m relay (Note: Teammate Antonio Pettigrew later admitted to using performance-enhancing drugs and the IAAF disqualified the team.)
Disqualified	2003 Paris	4 × 400 m relay (Note: Teammates Jerome Young and Calvin Harrison were later found to have used performance-enhancing drugs and the IAAF disqualified the team.)
Summer Universiade
Gold medal – first place	1999 Palma de Mallorca	4 x 400 m relay

Derrick Keith Brew (born December 28, 1977) is a 2004 Olympic Gold medalist in the Men's 4 × 400 meter relay for the United States. Earlier in the games he took third in the US sweep of the 400 m.

Born in Houston, Texas, he attended Klein Forest High School where he was coached by Jack Sands.

Brew competed for the LSU Tigers track and field team in the NCAA.
