= Kamghe Gaba =

German sprinter

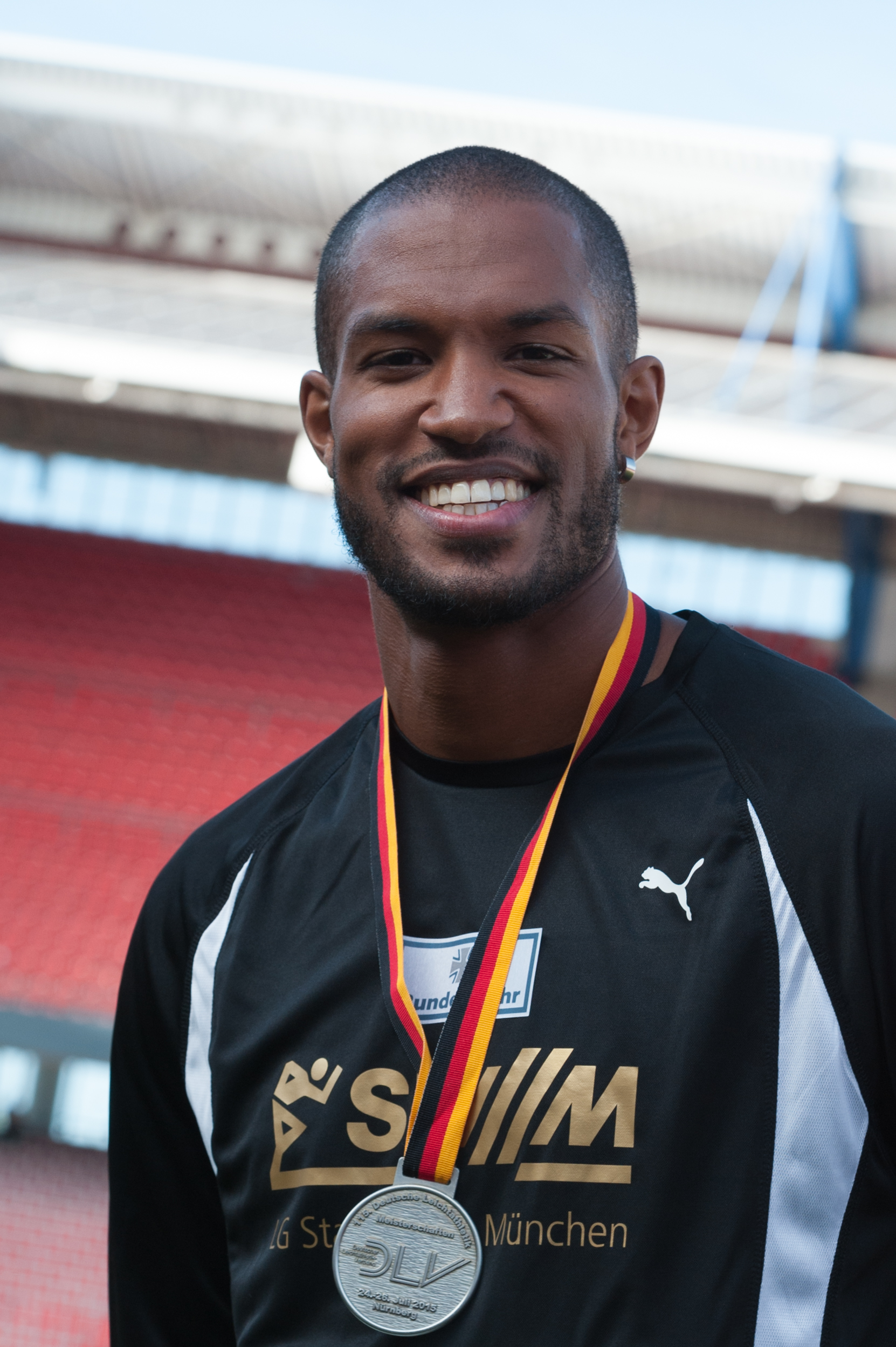

Personal information
- Full name: Kamghe Gaba
- Born: 13 January 1984 (age 42) Friedberg (Hessen), West Germany
- Height: 2.02 m (6 ft 8 in)

Sport
- Country: Germany
- Sport: Athletics
- Event: 400 metres

Achievements and titles
- Personal bests: 400 metres: 45.47 (Ulm; 16 July 2006)

Kamghe Gaba (born 13 January 1984 in Friedberg (Hessen)) is a German sprinter who specialises in the 400 metres. He represents LG Eintracht Frankfurt.

As a teenager he competed in combined events, finishing fifth in the octathlon at the 2001 World Youth Championships in Debrecen.

In 2006 he ran in a personal best of 45.47 seconds as he became German champion for the first time.

He has a German mother and a Chadian father.

== Achievements ==
Year	Competition	Venue	Position	Event	Notes
Representing Germany
2002	World Junior Championships	Kingston, Jamaica	17th (sf)	400m	47.67
2002	World Junior Championships	Kingston, Jamaica	7th	4×400m relay	3:11.21
2003	European Junior Championships	Tampere, Finland	2nd	400 m	46,63
2004	Olympic Games	Athens, Greece	7th	4x400 m relay	3:02.22
2005	European U23 Championships	Erfurt, Germany	2nd	400m	47.07
2005	European U23 Championships	Erfurt, Germany	5th	4x400m relay	3:05.35
2006	European Championships	Gothenburg, Sweden	4th	4 × 400 m relay	3:02.83
2006	World Athletics Final	Stuttgart, Germany	8th	400 m	45.96
2006	World Cup	Athens, Greece	5th	4 × 400 m relay	3:03.90
2010	European Championships	Barcelona, Spain	4th	4 × 400 m relay	3:02.65
2012	European Championships	Helsinki, Finland	3rd	4 × 400 m relay	3:01.77
2014	European Championships	Zürich, Switzerland	6th	4 × 400 m relay	3:01.70
2016	European Championships	Amsterdam, Netherlands	8th	4 × 400 m relay	3:05.67

=== Personal bests ===
- 200 metres – 20.88 s (2008)
- 400 metres – 45.47 s (2006)
