= Juan Betances =

Dominican Republic sprinter (born 1983)

Juan Betances (born 10 January 1983) is a sprinter from the Dominican Republic.

He finished fifth in the 4 × 400 metres relay at the 2006 World Indoor Championships, together with teammates Arismendy Peguero, Danis García and Carlos Santa.
