= Yuki Yamaguchi =

Japanese sprinter

Yūki Yamaguchi
Personal information
- Nationality: Japan
- Born: 22 February 1984 (age 42) Maizuru, Kyoto Prefecture, Japan
- Height: 1.74 m (5 ft 9 in)
- Weight: 62 kg (137 lb)

Sport
- Sport: Track and field
- Event: 400 m
- University team: Tokai University
- Retired: 2012
- Now coaching: East Maizuru High School Track and Field Club

Achievements and titles
- Personal best: 400 m: 45.18 (Fukuroi 2003) NJR
Medal record
Men's athletics
Representing Japan
Asian Championships
Gold medal – first place	2005 Incheon	4×400 m relay
Silver medal – second place	2003 Manila	4×400 m relay
Bronze medal – third place	2003 Manila	400 m
East Asian Games
Gold medal – first place	2005 Macau	4×400 m relay
Universiade
Silver medal – second place	2005 İzmir	4×400 m relay
Bronze medal – third place	2005 İzmir	400 m

Yuki Yamaguchi (山口 有希, Yamaguchi Yūki; born 22 February 1984 in Maizuru, Kyoto) is a former Japanese sprinter who specialised in the 400 metres.

His personal best time was 45.18 seconds, achieved in the 2003 National Sports Festival of Japan in Fukuroi. This is the current Japanese junior record.

== Personal bests ==
Event	Time	Venue	Date	Notes
400 m	45.18 s	Fukuroi, Japan	29 October 2003	Japan's 5th-fastest time

== Records ==
- 400 metres
  - Current Japanese junior record holder - 45.18 s (Fukuroi, 29 October 2003)
- 4 × 400 m relay
  - Current Japanese university record holder - 3:03.20 s (relay leg: 3rd) (İzmir, 20 August 2005)^{[a]}

^{a} with Kazunori Ōta, Yoshihiro Horigome, and Kenji Narisako

== International competition record ==
Year	Competition	Venue	Position	Event	Notes
Representing Japan
2002	World Junior Championships	Kingston, Jamaica	23rd (h)	400 m	47.74
2002	World Junior Championships	Kingston, Jamaica	3rd	4 × 400 m relay	3:05.80 (relay leg: 3rd) AJR
2002	Asian Junior Championships	Bangkok, Thailand	1st	400 m	47.11
2002	Asian Junior Championships	Bangkok, Thailand	1st	4 × 400 m relay	3:07.51 (relay leg: 2nd)
2003	World Championships	Saint-Denis, France	7th	4 × 400 m relay	3:03.15 (relay leg: 1st)
2003	Asian Championships	Manila, Philippines	3rd	400 m	46.18
2003	Asian Championships	Manila, Philippines	2nd	4 × 400 m relay	3:03.59 (relay leg: 1st)
2004	Olympic Games	Athens, Greece	31st (h)	400 m	46.16
2004	Olympic Games	Athens, Greece	4th	4 × 400 m relay	3:00.99 (relay leg: 1st)
2005	Universiade	İzmir, Turkey	3rd	400 m	46.15
2005	Universiade	İzmir, Turkey	2nd	4 × 400 m relay	3:03.20 (relay leg: 3rd) NUR
2005	Asian Championships	Incheon, South Korea	5th	400 m	46.65
2005	Asian Championships	Incheon, South Korea	1st	4 × 400 m relay	3:03.51 (relay leg: 1st)
2005	East Asian Games	Macau, China	1st	4 × 400 m relay	3:07.70 (relay leg: 1st)
2006	Asian Games	Doha, Qatar	6th	400 m	47.13
2007	World Championships	Osaka, Japan	40th (h)	400 m	46.28
2007	World Championships	Osaka, Japan	10th (h)	4 × 400 m relay	3:02.76 (relay leg: 1st)
