= Carlos Santa =

Dominican Republic sprinter

Personal information
- Full name: Carlos Johelín Santa Ramírez
- Born: 7 January 1978 (age 48) Azua de Compostela, Dominican Republic
Medal record
Men's Athletics
Representing the Dominican Republic
World Indoor Championships
Bronze medal – third place	2008 Valencia	4x400 m relay
Pan American Games
Bronze medal – third place	2003 Santo Domingo	4x400 m relay
Bronze medal – third place	2007 Rio de Janeiro	4x400 m relay
NACAC Championships
Bronze medal – third place	2007 San Salvador	4x400 m relay
CAC Junior Championships (U20)
Silver medal – second place	1996 San Salvador	4x400 m relay
Bronze medal – third place	1996 San Salvador	400 m

Carlos Johelín Santa Ramírez (born 7 January 1978 in Azua de Compostela) is a sprinter from the Dominican Republic who specializes in the 400 metres.

== Career ==
He competed at the 2000 and 2004 Summer Olympics as well as the World Championships in 1999, 2003 and 2005, and finished fifth at the 2005 World Athletics Final.

In 2006 he finished fifth in 4 x 400 metres relay at the 2006 World Indoor Championships, together with teammates Arismendy Peguero, Danis García and Juan Betances, and won a bronze medal in the same event at the 2006 IAAF World Cup with the American team.

His personal best time is 45.05 seconds, achieved in August 2004 in Huelva.

== Achievements ==
Year	Competition	Venue	Position	Event	Notes
Representing the Dominican Republic
1996	Central American and Caribbean Junior Championships (U-20)	San Salvador, El Salvador	3rd	400 m	47.19
1996	Central American and Caribbean Junior Championships (U-20)	San Salvador, El Salvador	4th	4 × 100 m relay	41.57
1996	Central American and Caribbean Junior Championships (U-20)	San Salvador, El Salvador	2nd	4 × 400 m relay	3:13.99
1998	Central American and Caribbean Games	Maracaibo, Venezuela	5th	400 m	46.13
1998	Central American and Caribbean Games	Maracaibo, Venezuela	6th	4×100 m relay	40.93
1998	Central American and Caribbean Games	Maracaibo, Venezuela	5th	4×400 m relay	3:08.75
1999	Central American and Caribbean Championships	Bridgetown, Barbados	3rd	4 × 400 m relay	3:09.08
1999	Pan American Games	Winnipeg, Canada	13th (h)	400 m	46.26
1999	Pan American Games	Winnipeg, Canada	6th	4 × 400 m relay	3:05.19
1999	World Championships	Seville, Spain	39th (h)	400 m	46.80
2000	Olympic Games	Sydney, Australia	43rd (h)	400 m	46.40
2001	Central American and Caribbean Championships	Guatemala City, Guatemala	10th (h)	400 m	48.21
2002	Ibero-American Championships	Guatemala City, Guatemala	1st	400 m	45.69
2002	NACAC U-25 Championships	San Antonio, Texas, United States	4th	400m	45.77
2002	NACAC U-25 Championships	San Antonio, Texas, United States	5th	4 × 100 m relay	40.29
2002	Central American and Caribbean Games	San Salvador, El Salvador	1st	400m	45.83
2002	Central American and Caribbean Games	San Salvador, El Salvador	1st	4 × 400 m relay	3:04.15
2003	Pan American Games	Santo Domingo, Dom. Rep.	6th	400 m	45.85
2003	Pan American Games	Santo Domingo, Dom. Rep.	3rd	4 × 400 m relay	3:02.02
2003	World Championships	Paris, France	15th (sf)	400 m	45.43
2003	World Championships	Paris, France	—	4 × 400 m relay	DSQ
2004	Ibero-American Championships	Huelva, Spain	1st	400 m	45.05
2004	Olympic Games	Athens, Greece	13th (sf)	400 m	45.58
2005	World Championships	Helsinki, Finland	9th (sf)	400 m	46.07
2006	Central American and Caribbean Games	Cartagena, Colombia	6th	200 m	21.14
2007	NACAC Championships	San Salvador, El Salvador	3rd	4 × 400 m relay	3:04.96
2007	Pan American Games	Rio de Janeiro, Brazil	16th (sf)	400 m	47.45
2007	Pan American Games	Rio de Janeiro, Brazil	3rd	4 × 400 m relay	3:02.48
2007	World Championships	Osaka, Japan	36th (h)	400 m	45.99
2007	World Championships	Osaka, Japan	7th	4 × 400 m relay	3:03.56
