= Dmitry Forshev =

Russian sprinter (born 1976)

Dmitriy Leonidovich Forshev
Personal information
- Native name: Дми́трий Леони́дович Фо́ршев
- Born: May 30, 1976 (age 50) Nizhny Tagil, Soviet Union
- Spouse: Olesya Forsheva (m. 2005)

Sport
- Sport: Sprinting
- Events: 400 metres; 4 x 400 metres relay
- Coached by: Vladimir Kazarin
Medal record
Representing Russia
World Indoor Championships
Silver medal – second place	2001 Lisbon	4x400m relay
Silver medal – second place	2004 Budapest	4x400m relay
European Indoor Championships
Bronze medal – third place	2005 Madrid	4x400m relay

Dmitriy Leonidovich Forshev (Russian: Дми́трий Леони́дович Фо́ршев; born 30 May 1976) is a Russian sprinter who specializes in the 400 metres. Vladimir Kazarin is his coach.

Forshev won the silver medal in 4 x 400 metres relay at the 2004 World Indoor Championships, together with teammates Boris Gorban, Andrey Rudnitskiy and Aleksandr Usov.

At the 2005 European Indoor Championships Forshev finished fourth in 400 m and third in 4x400 m relay. Later that year the relay team finished seventh at the 2005 World Championships with Forshev, Rudnitskiy, Oleg Mishukov and Yevgeniy Lebedev.

His personal best time is 45.62 seconds, achieved in June 2003 in Florence.

Forshev married Olesya Krasnomovets in 2005.

== Sources ==
- Олеся Красномовец и Дмитрий Форшев стали легкоатлетической семьей [Olesya Krasnomovets and Dmitry Forshev are now an athletics family]. RIA Novosti (in Russian). 2008-06-07 [21 September 2005].
- Matthews, Peter (2012). Athletics 2012: The International Track and Field Annual. Cheltenham: SportsBooks Limited. ISBN 978-1-90752-423-3 – via Internet Archive.
- Wittingham, Rob; Matthews, Peter, eds. (2006). British Athletics 2006. Bredbury, Stockport: Umbra Athletics Limited. ISBN 0-954-03906-8 – via Internet Archive.
