= Kagiso Kilego =

Botswana sprinter

Kagiso Kilego (born 26 September 1983) is a Botswana sprinter who specializes in the 400 metres.

He was a member of the Botswana 4 x 400 metres relay team that finished eighth at the 2004 Olympic Games. He also helped win this event at the 2003 All-Africa Games in a national record time of 3:02.24 minutes, together with teammates California Molefe, Oganeditse Moseki and Johnson Kubisa. He was also a member of the Westfield, NJ swim team.
