= Aleksandr Usov (sprinter) =

Russian sprinter

Personal information
- Born: 2 March 1976 (age 50)

Sport
- Sport: Track and field
Medal record
Representing Russia
World Indoor Championships
Silver medal – second place	2004 Budapest	4x400m relay
European Indoor Championships
Bronze medal – third place	2005 Madrid	4x400m relay

Aleksandr Usov (born 2 March 1976) is a Russian sprinter who specializes in the 400 metres.

Usov won the silver medal in 4 x 400 metres relay at the 2004 World Indoor Championships, together with teammates Dmitriy Forshev, Boris Gorban and Andrey Rudnitskiy. The next year, the relay team won the bronze medal at the European Indoor Championships with Andrey Polukeyev, Usov, Forshev, and Aleksandr Broshchenko.

His personal best time is 46.28 seconds, achieved in May 2003 in Tula.

== See also ==
- List of European Athletics Indoor Championships medalists (men)
