= Andrey Rudnitskiy =

Russian sprinter

Andrey Petrovich Rudnitskiy (Russian: Андре́й Петро́вич Рудни́цкий; born 12 November 1979 in Lutava) is a Russian sprinter who specializes in the 400 metres.

Rudnitskiy won the silver medal in 4 x 400 metres relay at the 2004 World Indoor Championships, together with teammates Dmitriy Forshev, Boris Gorban and Aleksandr Usov. The next year the relay team finished seventh at the 2005 World Championships with Forshev, Rudnitskiy, Oleg Mishukov and Yevgeniy Lebedev.

His personal best time is 45.76 seconds, achieved in August 2003 in Tula.

In February 2008, at the Russian Indoor Athletics Championships in Moscow, he won the 4 × 200 meters relay, but failed the doping test with traces of Carphedon and Cannabis found in his blood sample. As a result, the IAAF suspended Rudnitsky for two years.
