= Darold Williamson =

American track athlete (born 1983)

Personal information
- Full name: Darold Andre Williamson
- Nationality: United States
- Born: February 19, 1983 (age 43) San Antonio, Texas, U.S.
- Height: 6 ft 2 in (188 cm)
- Weight: 170 lb (77 kg)

Sport
- Sport: Running
- College team: Baylor University

Achievements and titles
- Personal bests: 200 m: 20.91; 400 m: 44.27
Medal record
Men's athletics
Representing the United States
Olympic Games
Gold medal – first place	2004 Athens	4 × 400 m relay
World Championships
Gold medal – first place	2005 Helsinki	4 × 400 m relay
Gold medal – first place	2007 Osaka	4 × 400 m relay
World Junior Championships
Gold medal – first place	2002 Kingston	400 m

Darold Williamson (born February 19, 1983) is a retired American track athlete. He ran the anchor leg on the US gold medal 4 × 400 meter relay team at the 2004 Summer Olympics.

== Early life ==
Williamson was born in San Antonio, Texas in 1983. He is a 2001 graduate of the Business Careers High School in San Antonio. Williamson was in the foster care program of the State of Texas and is a Preparation for Adult Living (PAL) alumnus. He is a 2005 graduate of Baylor University in Waco, Texas.

== Sports ==
Williamson attended the Olympics one time when he ran the anchor leg on the gold medal-winning 4 × 400 meter relay team for the US at the 2004 Summer Olympics in Athens. He won World Championship gold medals on two subsequent relay teams. While at Baylor University, Williamson won the Big 12 Conference championship in the 400-meter run three years in a row from 2001 to 2003. (Note: Each of the aforementioned relay teams also included Baylor teammate Jeremy Wariner.) He set a personal best of 44.27 seconds in the 400-meter run in the semifinals of the NCAA Outdoor Championships in 2005.
