= Gaolesiela Salang =

Botswana sprinter

Personal information
- Citizenship: Motswana
- Born: 12 February 1983 (age 43) Rakops, Botswana

Sport
- Country: Botswana
- Sport: Track and field
- Disability: No

Achievements and titles
- Olympic finals: 2004 Olympic Games.
- Personal bests: 400 meters, 4 x 400 metres relay

Gaolesiela Salang (born 12 February 1983 in Rakops) is a Botswana sprinter who specializes in the 400 metres.

He was a member of the Botswana 4 x 400 metres relay team that finished eighth at the 2004 Olympic Games.
