= Mark Ormrod (athlete) =

Australian athlete (born 1982)

Personal information
- Born: 1 December 1982 (age 43) Adelaide, Australia

Sport
- Sport: Soccer; Athletics
- Event: 400 metres
Medal record
Men's athletics
Representing Australia
Olympic Games
Silver medal – second place	2004 Athens	4x400m Relay
Commonwealth Games
Gold medal – first place	2006 Melbourne	4 × 400 metres relay

Mark Ormrod (born 1 December 1982 in Adelaide) is an Australian athlete. He originally played soccer, but quit the sport to start a career in athletics, specialising in the 400 metres. He attended Adelaide Private School and Pedare Christian College

He competed in the 2004 Olympics as a part of the Australian team that won the silver medal in the 4 × 400 metres relay. In 2006, the Australian relay team won the gold medal at the Commonwealth Games.

In May 2006, Ormrod moved to the Australian Institute of Sport in Canberra, where he trained as a full-time athlete. He went to the 2007 World University Games in Bangkok, Thailand, where he was part of the silver medal-winning 4 × 400 m team. He also ran in the 2007 World Championships in Osaka Japan, again in the 4 × 400 m relay.

After returning to Adelaide in October 2007, Ormrod prepared for the 2008 Beijing Olympic Games, and once again teamed up with John Steffenson to run in the 4 × 400 m relay. After running in the heat where he officially recorded a 45.39 split, he was replaced in the final where the team ultimately finished 6th.

Ormrod rested from the 2008/09 domestic season and the 2009 World Championships in Berlin. He competed on the 2009/2010 Australian domestic scene improving his 100m PB to 10.46 (previously 10.58 in 2005) and his 200m PB to 21.00 (previously 21.02 in 2005). Ormrod retired from athletics after the 2010 Australian Championships in Perth.

PB's:

- 100m - 10.46 (26 March 2010, Perth WA)
- 200m - 21.00 (17 April 2010, Perth WA)
- 400m - 45.62 (01/12/2005, Melbourne VIC)
