= Arismendy Peguero =

Dominican Republic sprinter (born 1980)

Personal information
- Full name: Arismendy Peguero Matos
- Born: 2 August 1980 (age 45) La Romana, Dominican Republic
Medal record
Men's athletics
Representing the Dominican Republic
World Indoor Championships
Bronze medal – third place	2008 Valencia	4x400 m relay
CAC Championships
Bronze medal – third place	2013 Morelia	4x400 m relay
Military World Games
Bronze medal – third place	2011 Rio de Janeiro	400 m
Pan American Games
Silver medal – second place	2011 Guadalajara	4x400 m relay
Bronze medal – third place	2003 Santo Domingo	4x400 m relay
Bronze medal – third place	2007 Rio de Janeiro	4x400 m relay
NACAC Championships
Silver medal – second place	2007 San Salvador	400 m
Bronze medal – third place	2007 San Salvador	4x400 m relay

Arismendy Peguero Matos (born 2 August 1980) is a sprinter from the Dominican Republic who specializes in the 400 metres. He was born in La Romana.

Peguero finished fifth in 4 x 400 metres relay at the 2006 World Indoor Championships, together with teammates Danis García, Juan Betances and Carlos Santa. He later won a bronze medal in 400 m at the 2006 Central American and Caribbean Games. His success earned him the title Dominican Republic male athlete of the year in 2006.
