= Daniel Mensah Kwei =

Ghanaian sprinter

Personal information
- Nationality: Ghanaian
- Born: 22 February 1976 (age 50)

Sport
- Sport: Sprinting
- Event: 4 × 400 metres relay

Daniel Mensah Kwei (born 22 February 1976) is a Ghanaian sprinter. He competed in the men's 4 × 400 metres relay at the 2000 Summer Olympics.
