= Enefiok Udo-Obong =

Nigerian sprinter

Medal record

Men's athletics

Representing Nigeria

Olympic Games
Gold medal – first place	2000 Sydney	4×400 m
Bronze medal – third place	2004 Athens	4×400 m

African Championships
Silver medal – second place	2004 Brazzaville	4×400 m

Enefiok Udo-Obong (born 22 May 1982), also known as Enee, is a Nigerian sprinter and accomplished athlete. He is also a writer, speaker, businessman, and administrator.

== Education ==
Udo-Obong earned a degree in Human anatomy from the University of Calabar. He also earned an Advanced Master's degree in Sports Administration and Technology from the École Polytechnique Fédérale de Lausanne (EPFL), which is located in Switzerland.

== Awards and accomplishments ==
Udo-Obong won the gold medal in 4 × 400 meter relay at the 2000 Summer Olympics. He also won the bronze medal in the same event at the 2004 Summer Olympics. In 2000, he was voted Sportsman of the Year, and won the Dele Udo prize for sporting excellence. He has also won the national championships on three occasions, and is a six-time medalist at a national sports festival is Nigeria.

Udo-Obong was nominated as one of the 50 most influential young Africans by African Digest in 2002, where he also captained Team Nigeria to the Commonwealth Games in Manchester, UK.

Udo-Obong is a recipient of the Akwa Ibom State Honours Roll, and is also a recipient of the Certificate of Award for Outstanding Contribution to Sports Development in Nigeria.

Udo-Obong is a former board member of the Nigerian Olympic Committee, and chairperson of the Athletes' Commission. He is also a member of the Athletes' Commission of the Association of National Olympic Committees in Africa (ANOCA), a member of the Nigerian Olympians Association, a member of the advisory board of the Atlanta 1996 training centre in Atlanta, a member of the Institute of Registered Exercise Professionals, a member of the international Fitness Association (IFA), And the American College of Sports Medicine (ACSM), as well as other international bodies. He is also the president of the Association of Fitness Practitioners in Nigeria.

Udo-Obong is the author of the motivational book, "The Silver Lining: Turning Major Setbacks into Major Victories", which has sold over 25,000 copies across the nation.

Udo-Obong was recently appointed a facilitator by the International Olympic Committee (IOC) to train athletes in the Athletes Career Program (ACP), a program designed to "help athletes to transition into a productive life after their sporting careers".

== Publications ==
He has written the following books. "The Silver Lining-Turning Major setbacks into Major Victories" (2006), "The Goldmine-unleashing the Champion in you" (2021) and "In the Long Run-The Great Race Fiasco" (2023)

== Personal bests ==
- 200 metres – 20.67 s (2006)
- 300 metres – 32.62 s (2000)
- 400 metres – 45.68 s (2000)
