= Ezra Sambu =

Kenyan sprinter

Personal information
- Born: September 4, 1978 (age 47)
Medal record
Men's athletics
Representing Kenya
All-Africa Games
Gold medal – first place	2003 Abuja	400 m
African Championships
Silver medal – second place	2004 Brazzaville	400 m
Afro-Asian Games
Gold medal – first place	2003 Hyderabad	400 m

Ezra Kenyoke Sambu (born September 4, 1978, in Marigat, Baringo County) is a Kenyan sprinter who specializes in the 400 metres.

His personal best time is 44.43 seconds, achieved in July 2003 in Nairobi. This ranks him third in Kenya, behind Samson Kitur and Charles Gitonga, and fifth in Africa, behind Innocent Egbunike, Kitur, Gitonga and Davis Kamoga. He won gold at the 2003 Afro-Asian Games.

Sambu was the captain of the Kenyan team at the 2007 All-Africa Games. He planned to retire after the 2008 Summer Olympics in Beijing, China He did not, however, participate at the Olympics. As of 2009, he is reported to be still active, although sidelined due to injury.
