= Jermaine Gonzales =

Jamaican sprinter (born 1984)

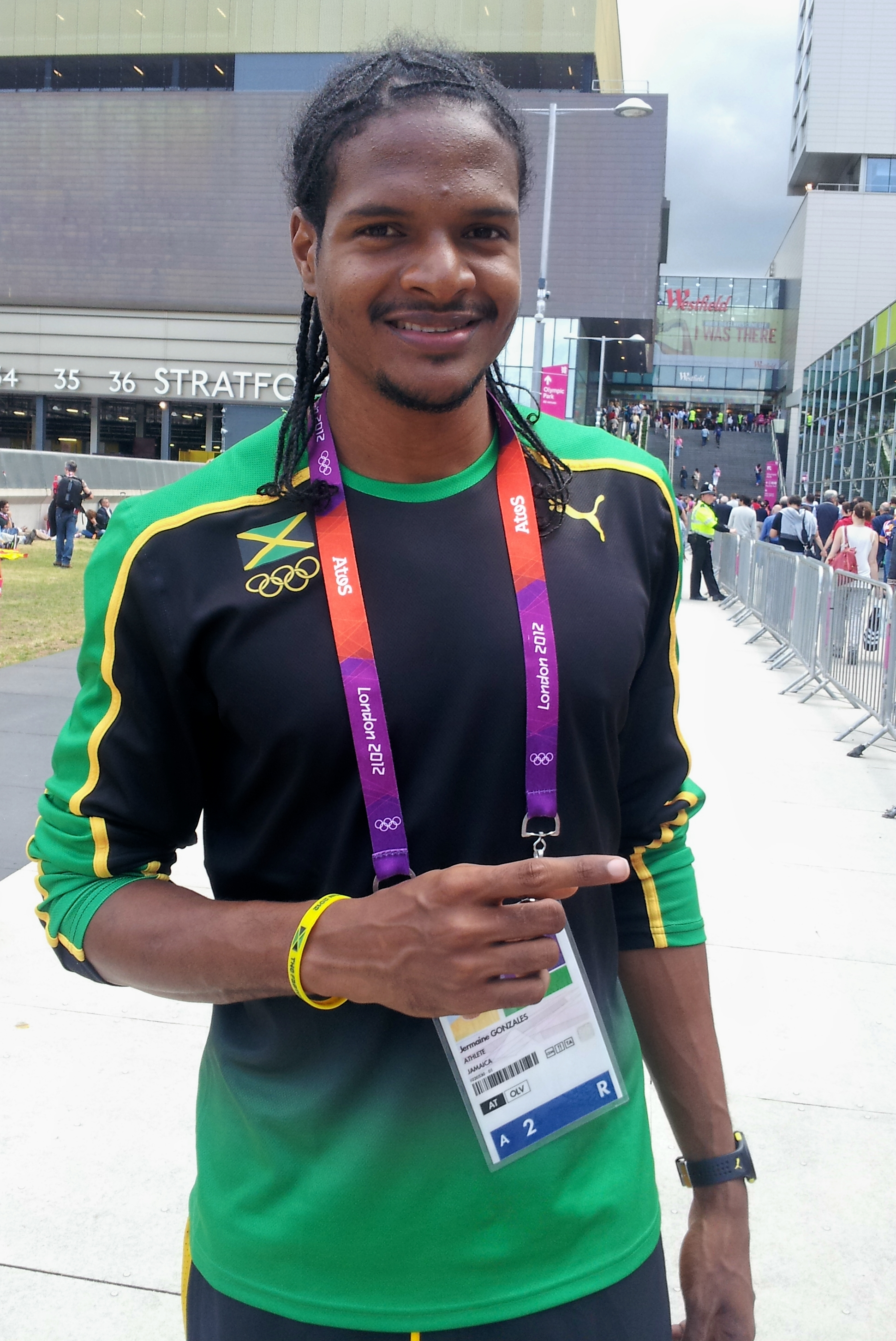
- Jermaine Gonzales at the 2012 London Summer Olympics

Personal information
- Nationality: Jamaica
- Born: 26 November 1984 (age 41) Kitson Town, Saint Catherine Parish
- Height: 1.91 m (6 ft 3 in)
- Weight: 87 kg (192 lb)

Sport
- Sport: Running
- Event: 400 metres

Achievements and titles
- Personal best: 400 m: 44.40 s (Monaco 2010)
Medal record
Men's athletics
Representing Jamaica
World Championships
| Bronze medal – third place | 2011 Daegu | 4 × 400 m relay |
World Junior Championships
| Bronze medal – third place | 2002 Kingston | 400 m |
World Youth Championships
| Bronze medal – third place | 2001 Debrecen | 400 m |
Commonwealth Games
| Bronze medal – third place | 2006 Melbourne | 400 m |
| Bronze medal – third place | 2006 Melbourne | 4 × 400 m relay |
CAC Junior Championships (Junior)
| Gold medal – first place | 2002 Bridgetown | 400 m |
| Gold medal – first place | 2002 Bridgetown | 4 × 400 m relay |
CARIFTA Games (Junior)
| Gold medal – first place | 2002 Nassau | 400 m |
| Gold medal – first place | 2002 Nassau | 4 × 400 m relay |

Jermaine Gonzales (born 26 November 1984) is a retired Jamaican 400 metres runner. He was being coached by Glen Mills and Bertland Cameron.

He had a successful start to international athletics in the young age categories, taking the 400 m bronze at the 2001 World Youth Championships in Athletics and stepping up a level for another bronze at the 2002 World Junior Championships in Athletics. He missed large parts of the 2003 and 2004 seasons due to injury. He competed at the 2004 Summer Olympics with the Jamaican 4 × 400 metre relay team, which was disqualified. He won his first senior medal at the 2006 Commonwealth Games with a new personal best time of 45.16 seconds.

He improved his personal best to 44.79 seconds with a win at a meeting in June in Sotteville-lès-Rouen – the first time he had run under 45 seconds since 2006. The following month he broke Roxbert Martin's Jamaican record to win the Herculis Diamond League meeting with a time of 44.40 seconds—setting a world-leading mark.
