= Johnson Kubisa =

Motswana sprinter (born 1972)

Medal record

Men's athletics

Representing Botswana

African Championships
Silver medal – second place	2000 Algiers	4×400 m

Johnson Kubisa (born 23 April 1972) is a Motswana sprinter who specializes in the 400 metres.

He was a member of the Botswana 4 x 400 metres relay team that finished eighth at the 2004 Olympic Games. He also helped win this event at the 2003 All-Africa Games in a national record time of 3:02.24 minutes, together with teammates California Molefe, Kagiso Kilego and Oganeditse Moseki.

On the individual level, Kubisa finished seventh at the 2002 African Championships and won a bronze medal at the 2003 Military World Games. Participating in the 2000 Summer Olympics, he achieved seventh place in his heat, thus failing to make it through to the second round.

== See also ==
- Botswana at the 2003 All-Africa Games
- Botswana at the 2004 Summer Olympics
