= Gakologelwang Masheto =

Botswana sprinter

Gakologelwang Masheto OLY
Personal information
- Full name: Gakologelwang Lesiba; Masheto
- Nickname: Shoes
- Nationality: Botswana
- Born: 1 November 1984 (age 42) Maun, Botswana
- Height: 1.78 m (5 ft 10 in)
- Weight: 60 kg (132 lb)

Sport
- Sport: Athletics
- Event: Sprint
- College team: Illinois Fighting Illini (USA)

Achievements and titles
- Personal best: 400 m: 45.41 s (2007)
Medal record
Men's athletics
Representing Botswana
African Championships
| Bronze medal – third place | 2006 Bambous | 4×400 m |

Gakologelwang Lesiba Masheto (born 1 November 1984 in Maun) is a Botswana sprinter, who specialized in the 400 metres. He set a personal best time of 45.41 seconds by winning the 400 metres at a collegiate athletics meet in Tucson, Arizona.

Masheto represented Botswana at the 2008 Summer Olympics in Beijing, where he competed for the men's 400 metres. He ran in the first heat against seven other athletes, including Belgium's Kévin Borlée, and United States' David Neville, both of whom were heavy favorites in this event. He finished the race in last place by twenty-three hundredths of a second (0.23) behind Mauritius' Eric Milazar, with a seasonal best time of 46.29 seconds. Masheto, however, failed to advance into the semi-finals, as he placed thirty-eighth overall, and was ranked farther below three mandatory slots for the next round.

Masheto is also a member of the track and field team for the Illinois Fighting Illini, and a graduate of kinesiology at the University of Illinois in Urbana, Illinois.
