= Saul Weigopwa =

Nigerian sprinter

Personal information
- Born: 14 June 1984 (age 42)
Medal record
Men's athletics
Representing Nigeria
Olympic Games
Bronze medal – third place	2004 Athens	4x400 m
African Championships
Gold medal – first place	2012 Porto-Novo	4×400 m
Silver medal – second place	2004 Brazzaville	4×400 m
Bronze medal – third place	2010 Nairobi	4×400 m

Saul Weigopwa (born 14 June 1984 in Song) is a Nigerian athlete, who specializes in the 400 m, where his personal best is 45.00s (a result he has achieved twice).

At the 2004 Summer Olympic Games Weigopwa competed in 400 m, where he was knocked out in the semi-finals with 45.67s. He was also part of the Nigerian team that won the bronze medal in 4 × 400 m relay.
