= Vincent Mumo Kiilu =

Kenyan sprint runner and hurdler (born 1982)

Personal information
- Born: 3 August 1982 (age 43) Makueni County, Kisau division, Kenya
- Height: 1.63 m (5 ft 4 in)
- Weight: 56 kg (123 lb)

Sport
- Country: Kenya
- Sport: Athletics
- Event: various
Medal record
Men's athletics
Representing Kenya
Commonwealth Games
Silver medal – second place	2010 New Delhi	4x400m
All-Africa Games
Gold medal – first place	2011 Maputo	4x400m
African Championships
Gold medal – first place	2006 Bambous	4×400 m
Bronze medal – third place	2012 Porto-Novo	4×400 m

Vincent Mumo Kiilu (born 3 August 1982) is a former Kenyan sprint runner and hurdler who has competed in the 2008 and the 2012 Olympic Games. He has twice competed at the Commonwealth Games (2006 and 2010), including a relay silver medal on his second appearance. He was selected for Kenya at the World Championships in Athletics in 2003 and 2011. He recently worked as an athletic coach in different capacity, from assistant coach to a head coach.

In the 2012 Olympic 4x400 meter relay semifinal heat, Kiilu cut in front of South Africa's Ofentse Mogawane and both runners fell. Mogawane dislocated his shoulder and was unable to complete the race. The South African team filed an appeal, and the Kenyan team was disqualified when the IAAF ruled that Kiilu had obstructed Mogawane.

Kiilu is affiliated with the Kenyan army and has won medals at the 2003 Military World Games and the 2002 Africa Military Games
