= Musa Audu =

Nigerian sprinter

Personal information
- Nationality: Nigerian
- Born: 18 June 1980 (age 46) Nigeria
- Height: 174 cm (5 ft 9 in)
- Weight: 75 kg (165 lb)

Sport
- Sport: Athletics
- Event: 400m
- Club: Woodford Green with Essex Ladies
Medal record
Men's athletics
Representing Nigeria
Olympic Games
Bronze medal – third place	2004 Athens	4x400 m
African Championships
Bronze medal – third place	1998 Dakar	4×400 m

Musa Audu (born 18 June 1980) is a Nigerian athlete who specializes in 400 metres. He is notable for winning the bronze medal in the 2004 Olympics 4 x 400 metres relay as part of the Nigerian team and the silver medal in the 2003 All-Africa Games 4 x 400 metres relay as part of the Nigerian team too.
