= Oganeditse Moseki =

Botswana sprinter

Personal information
- Nationality: Botswana
- Born: 29 June 1979 (age 47)

Sport
- Sport: Sprinting
- Event: 4 × 400 metres relay
Medal record
Men's athletics
Representing Botswana
African Championships
Bronze medal – third place	2006 Bambous	4×400 m

Oganeditse Moseki (born 29 June 1979) is a Botswana sprinter. He competed in the men's 4 × 400 metres relay at the 2004 Summer Olympics.
