= California Molefe =

Botswana runner

Personal information
- Born: 12 March 1980 (age 46)
Medal record
Men's athletics
Representing Botswana
All-Africa Games
Gold medal – first place	2007 Algiers	400 m
African Championships
Bronze medal – third place	2006 Bambous	4×400 m

California Molefe (born 12 March 1980) is a Botswana runner who won a silver medal in 400 metres at the 2006 IAAF World Indoor Championships in Moscow, becoming the first Botswana athlete to win a major international medal.

His only title prior to 2006 was a bronze medal at the 1999 African Junior Championships. He competed at the 2004 Olympics, getting knocked out in the heats in the individual contest and placing eighth in the final with the 4 x 400 metres relay team. He won the gold medal in 400 m at the 2007 All-Africa Games.

Molefe set his personal best time during the heats at the 2005 World Championships with 45.34 seconds.
