= 2002 World Junior Championships in Athletics =

Athletics competition

- Host city: Kingston, Jamaica
- Nations: 159
- Athletes: 1069
- Events: 43
- Dates: 16–21 July
- Main venue: National Stadium

The 2002 World Junior Championships in Athletics were held in Kingston, Jamaica from July 16 to July 21, 2002.

== Men's results ==
Event	Gold		Silver		Bronze	
100 metres	Darrel Brown; Trinidad and Tobago	10.09 CR	Marc Burns; Trinidad and Tobago	10.18 PB	Willie Hordge; United States	10.36
100 metres	Brown's 10.09 then ranked fifth all-time among juniors. He eventually broke the WJR at the 2003 World Championships.					
200 metres	Usain Bolt; Jamaica	20.61	Brendan Christian; Antigua and Barbuda	20.74	Wes Felix; United States	20.82 PB
200 metres	At only 15 years, 332 days, Bolt became the youngest ever junior world champion. He was surpassed by Jacko Gill in the 2010 World Junior Championships.					
400 metres	Darold Williamson; United States	45.37	Jonathan Fortenberry; United States	45.73	Jermaine Gonzales; Jamaica	45.84 PB
800 metres	Alex Kipchirchir; Kenya	1:46.59	Salem Amer Al-Badri; Qatar	1:46.63 NJR	David Fiegen; Luxembourg	1:46.66
1500 metres	Yassine Bensghir; Morocco	3:40.72 PB	Abdulrahman Suleiman; Qatar	3:41.72	Samwel Mwera; Tanzania	3:41.75
5000 metres	Hillary Chenonge; Kenya	13:28.30 CR	Markos Geneti; Ethiopia	13:28.83 SB	Gebregziabher Gebremariam; Ethiopia	13:29.13
10,000 metres	Gebregziabher Gebremariam; Ethiopia	29:02.71	Sileshi Sihine; Ethiopia	29:03.74	Solomon Bushendich; Kenya	29:05.96
110 metres hurdles	Antwon Hicks; United States	13.42	Shi Dongpeng; China	13.58	Shamar Sands; Bahamas	13.67
400 metres hurdles	L. J. van Zyl; South Africa	48.89 CR	Kenneth Ferguson; United States	49.38 PB	Bershawn Jackson; United States	50.00 PB
3000 metres steeplechase	Michael Kipyego; Kenya	8:29.54	David Kirwa; Kenya	8:31.44	Abubaker Ali Kamal; Qatar	8:33.67 NJR
10,000 metres walk	Vladimir Kanaykin; Russia	41:41.40	Xu Xingde; China	41:44.00	Lu Ronghua; China	41:46.07
4 × 100 metres relay	United States; Ashton Collins; Wes Felix; Ivory Williams; Willie Hordge	38.92 WJR	Jamaica; Winston Hutton; Orion Nicely; Yhann Plummer; Usain Bolt	39.15 NJR	Trinidad and Tobago; Chevon Simpson; Marc Burns; Kevon Holder; Darrel Brown	39.17 NJR
4 × 400 metres relay	United States; Kenneth Ferguson; Darold Williamson; Ashton Collins; Jonathan Fortenberry	3:03.71	Jamaica; Sekou Clarke; Usain Bolt; Jermaine Myers; Jermaine Gonzales	3:04.06 NJR	Japan; Yamauchi Fujio; Daisuke Sakai; Yuki Yamaguchi; Yosuke Inoue	3:05.80 AJR
High jump	Andra Manson; United States	2.31 WJL	Zhu Wannan; China	2.23 PB	Germaine Mason; Jamaica	2.21
Pole vault	Maksym Mazuryk; Ukraine	5.55 WLJ	Vladyslav Revenko; Ukraine	5.55 WLJ	Vincent Favretto; France	5.40
Long jump	Ibrahim Abdulla Al-Waleed; Qatar	7.99 PB	Fabrice Lapierre; Australia	7.74 PB	Trevell Quinley; United States	7.71 PB
Triple jump	Arnie David Giralt; Cuba	16.68	Li Yanxi; China	16.66 PB	Aleksandr Sergeyev; Russia	16.55
Shot put 6 kg	Edis Elkasevic; Croatia	21.47 WLJ	Sean Shields; United States	20.54	Mika Vasara; Finland	20.50
Discus throw 1.75 kg	Wu Tao; China	64.51 WLJ	Dmitriy Sivakov; Belarus	62.00	Michał Hodun; Poland	61.74
Hammer throw 6 kg	Werner Smit; South Africa	76.43	Ali Al-Zinkawi; Kuwait	73.69	Aliaksandr Kazulka; Belarus	72.72
Javelin throw	Igor Janik; Poland	74.16	Vladislav Shkurlatov; Russia	74.09 PB	Jung Sang-Jin; South Korea	73.99 PB
Decathlon	Leonid Andreev; Uzbekistan	7693	Nadir El Fassi; France	7677	Mikko Halvari; Finland	7587
WR world record | AR area record | CR championship record | GR games record | NR national record | OR Olympic record | PB personal best | SB season best | WL world leading (in a given season)

== Women's results ==
Event	Gold		Silver		Bronze	
100 metres	Lauryn Williams; United States	11.33 PB	Simone Facey; Jamaica	11.43 PB	Marshevet Hooker; United States	11.48
200 metres	Vernicha James; Great Britain	22.93 PB	Anneisha McLaughlin; Jamaica	22.94 PB	Sanya Richards; United States	23.09
400 metres	Monique Henderson; United States	51.10 SB	Sanya Richards; United States	51.49	Sheryl Morgan; Jamaica	52.61
800 metres	Janeth Jepkosgei; Kenya	2:00.80 WLJ	Lucia Klocová; Slovakia	2:01.73	Juliana Paula de Azevedo; Brazil	2:03.81 PB
1500 metres	Viola Kibiwot; Kenya	4:12.57 PB	Berhane Herpassa; Ethiopia	4:13.59	Olesya Syreva; Russia	4:14.32 PB
3000 metres	Meseret Defar; Ethiopia	9:12.61	Mariem Alaoui Selsouli; Morocco	9:16.28 PB	Olesya Syreva; Russia	9:16.58 PB
5000 metres	Meseret Defar; Ethiopia	15:54.94	Tirunesh Dibaba; Ethiopia	15:55.99	Vivian Cheruiyot; Kenya	15:56.04
100 metres hurdles	Anay Tejeda; Cuba	12.81	Agnieszka Frankowska; Poland	13.16	Tina Klein; Germany	13.23
400 metres hurdles	Lashinda Demus; United States	54.70 WJR	Melaine Walker; Jamaica	56.03	Camille Robinson; Jamaica	56.14 PB
10,000 metres walk	Fumi Mitsumura; Japan	46:01.51 NJR	Liu Siqi; China	46:07.15	Maryna Tsikhanava; Belarus	46:14.67 SB
4 × 100 metres relay	Jamaica; Sherone Simpson; Kerron Stewart; Anneisha McLaughlin; Simone Facey	43.40 CR	United States; Lauryn Williams; Ashlee Williams; Shalonda Solomon; Marshevet Hooker	43.66	Great Britain; Jade Lucas-Read; Jeanette Kwakye; Amy Spencer; Vernicha James	44.22 PB
4 × 400 metres relay	United States; Christina Hardeman; Monique Henderson; Tiffany Ross; Lashinda Demus	3:29.95 NJR	Great Britain; Kim Wall; Amy Spencer; Vernicha James; Lisa Miller	3:30.46 NJR	Russia; Yelena Mygunova; Mariya Dryakhlova; Yuliya Gushchina; Tatyana Popova	3:34.49
High jump	Blanka Vlašić; Croatia	1.96 WLJ	Anna Ksok; Poland	1.87	Petrina Price; Australia	1.87
Pole vault	Floé Kühnert; Germany	4.40 CR	Yuliya Golubchikova; Russia	4.30	Nataliya Belinskaya; Russia	4.20
Long jump	Adina Anton; Romania	6.46 PB	Wang Lina; China	6.36	Esther Aghatise; Nigeria	6.34
Triple jump	Mabel Gay; Cuba	14.09	Yarianna Martínez; Cuba	13.74	Keila da Silva Costa; Brazil	13.70
Shot put	Valerie Adams; New Zealand	17.73 AJR	Zhang Ying; China	16.76	Laura Gerraughty; United States	16.62
Discus throw	Ma Xuejun; China	58.85 PB	Xu Shaoyang; China	57.87	Seema Antil; India	55.83
Hammer throw	Ivana Brkljačić; Croatia	65.39	Martina Danišová; Slovakia	63.91	Yuliya Rozenfeld; Russia	60.83 PB
Javelin throw	Linda Brivule; Latvia	55.35 PB	Ilze Gribule; Latvia	54.16 SB	Urszula Jasińska; Poland	54.06
Heptathlon	Carolina Klüft; Sweden	6470 WJR	Olga Alekseyeva; Kazakhstan	5727	Olga Levenkova; Russia	5712
WR world record | AR area record | CR championship record | GR games record | NR national record | OR Olympic record | PB personal best | SB season best | WL world leading (in a given season)

== Medal table ==
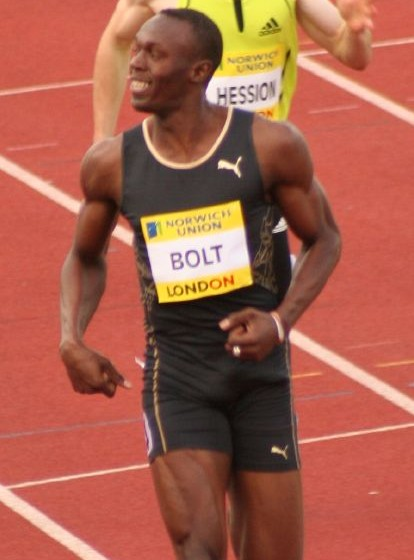
With his 200 metres gold medal, Usain Bolt of Jamaica became the youngest World Junior Championships winner at the time.

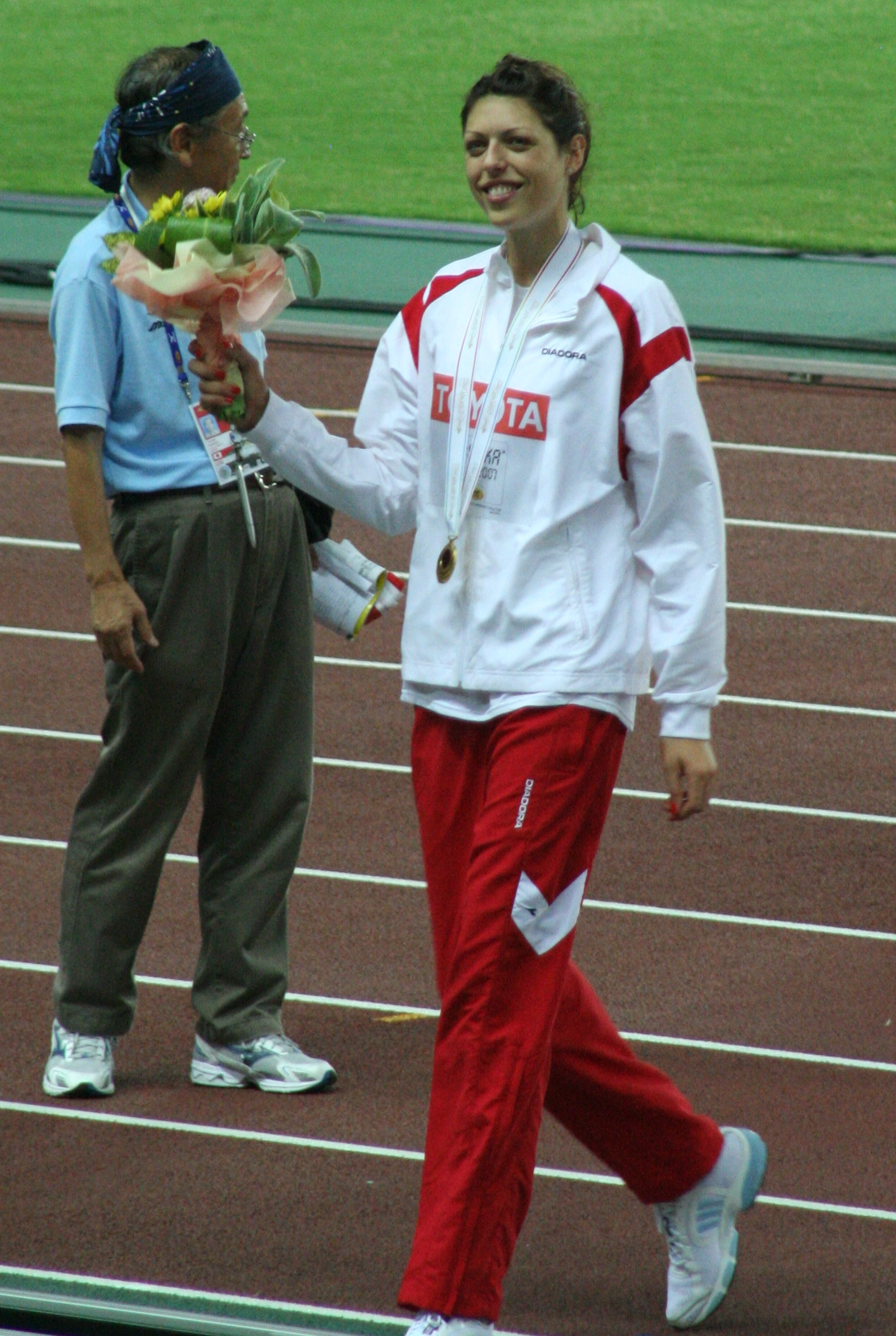
Blanka Vlašić of Croatia won the high jump.

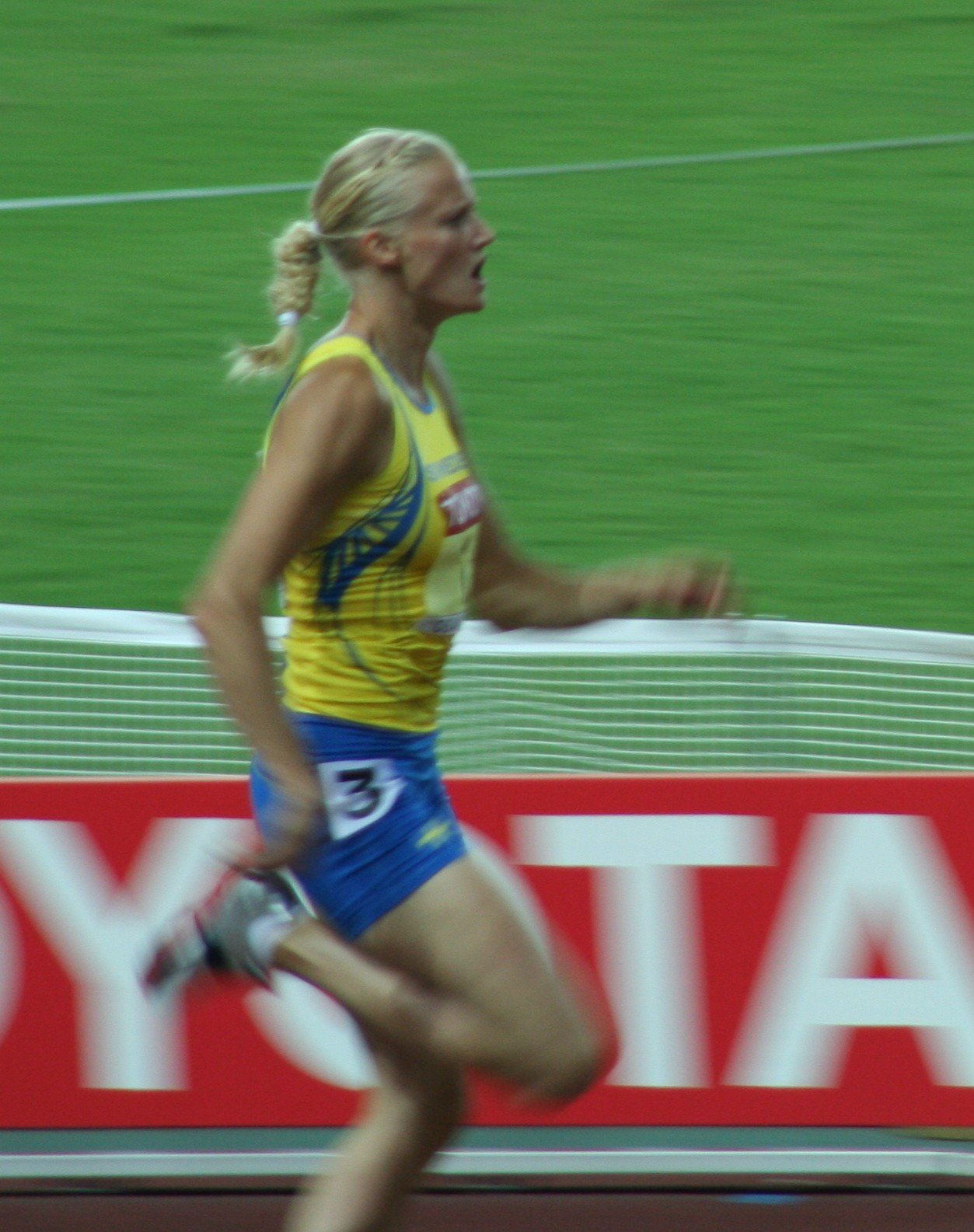
Sweden's Carolina Klüft set a new world junior record in the heptathlon.

* Host nation (Jamaica)

Rank	Nation	Gold	Silver	Bronze	Total
1	United States	9	5	7	21
2	Kenya	5	1	2	8
3	Ethiopia	3	4	1	8
4	Cuba	3	1	0	4
5	Croatia	3	0	0	3
6	China	2	8	1	11
7	Jamaica*	2	5	4	11
8	South Africa	2	0	0	2
9	Russia	1	2	7	10
10	Poland	1	2	2	5
11	Qatar	1	2	1	4
12	Great Britain	1	1	1	3
12	Trinidad and Tobago	1	1	1	3
14	Latvia	1	1	0	2
14	Morocco	1	1	0	2
14	Ukraine	1	1	0	2
17	Germany	1	0	1	2
17	Japan	1	0	1	2
19	New Zealand	1	0	0	1
19	Romania	1	0	0	1
19	Sweden	1	0	0	1
19	Uzbekistan	1	0	0	1
23	Slovakia	0	2	0	2
24	Belarus	0	1	2	3
25	Australia	0	1	1	2
25	France	0	1	1	2
27	Antigua and Barbuda	0	1	0	1
27	Kazakhstan	0	1	0	1
27	Kuwait	0	1	0	1
30	Brazil	0	0	2	2
30	Finland	0	0	2	2
32	Bahamas	0	0	1	1
32	India	0	0	1	1
32	Luxembourg	0	0	1	1
32	Nigeria	0	0	1	1
32	South Korea	0	0	1	1
32	Tanzania	0	0	1	1
Totals (37 entries)		43	43	43	129

== Participation ==
According to an unofficial count through an unofficial result list, 1069 athletes from 159 countries participated in the event. This is in agreement with the official numbers as published.

- Algeria (9)
- Andorra (1)
- Anguilla (1)
- Antigua and Barbuda (2)
- Argentina (3)
- Armenia (2)
- Aruba (1)
- Australia (45)
- Austria (3)
- Azerbaijan (1)
- Bahamas (6)
- Bahrain (1)
- Barbados (3)
- Belarus (13)
- Belgium (7)
- Belize (1)
- Bolivia (1)
- Bosnia and Herzegovina (2)
- Botswana (5)
- Brazil (27)
- British Virgin Islands (1)
- Bulgaria (6)
- Burkina Faso (1)
- Burundi (3)
- Cameroon (2)
- Canada (23)
- Cayman Islands (1)
- Chile (9)
- China (22)
- Chinese Taipei (5)
- Colombia (3)
- Cook Islands (1)
- Costa Rica (1)
- Côte d'Ivoire (1)
- Croatia (10)
- Cuba (13)
- Cyprus (5)
- Czech Republic (14)
- Denmark (2)
- Djibouti (2)
- Dominica (1)
- Dominican Republic (1)
- Ecuador (3)
- Egypt (6)
- El Salvador (1)
- Equatorial Guinea (1)
- Eritrea (2)
- Estonia (11)
- Ethiopia (7)
- Fiji (2)
- Finland (16)
- France (41)
- Gabon (1)
- Gambia (2)
- Georgia (2)
- Germany (65)
- Ghana (1)
- Gibraltar (2)
- Great Britain (28)
- Greece (16)
- Grenada (1)
- Guam (1)
- Guatemala (1)
- Guyana (1)
- Haiti (1)
- Honduras (1)
- Hong Kong (1)
- Hungary (20)
- Iceland (2)
- India (6)
- Ireland (10)
- Israel (3)
- Italy (18)
- Jamaica (41)
- Japan (31)
- Jordan (1)
- Kazakhstan (4)
- Kenya (18)
- Kiribati (1)
- Kuwait (3)
- Kyrgyzstan (1)
- Latvia (3)
- Lebanon (1)
- Lesotho (1)
- Lithuania (3)
- Luxembourg (2)
- Macedonia (1)
- Madagascar (1)
- Malawi (1)
- Maldives (1)
- Mali (1)
- Mauritius (1)
- Mexico (11)
- Federated States of Micronesia (1)
- Moldova (2)
- Morocco (11)
- Mozambique (1)
- Myanmar (1)
- Namibia (1)
- Netherlands (14)
- Netherlands Antilles (1)
- New Zealand (9)
- Nicaragua (1)
- Nigeria (6)
- Norway (5)
- Oman (1)
- Pakistan (1)
- Palestine (1)
- Panama (2)
- Papua New Guinea (1)
- Paraguay (1)
- Peru (1)
- Philippines (1)
- Poland (29)
- Portugal (7)
- Puerto Rico (1)
- Qatar (10)
- Romania (13)
- Russia (41)
- Rwanda (2)
- Saint Kitts and Nevis (4)
- Saint Lucia (1)
- Saint Vincent and the Grenadines (1)
- Samoa (1)
- São Tomé and Príncipe (1)
- Saudi Arabia (9)
- Senegal (6)
- Seychelles (1)
- Singapore (4)
- Slovakia (8)
- Slovenia (4)
- Solomon Islands (1)
- South Africa (19)
- South Korea (10)
- Spain (26)
- Sri Lanka (1)
- Sudan (4)
- Swaziland (1)
- Sweden (13)
- Switzerland (8)
- Tajikistan (1)
- Tanzania (2)
- Thailand (1)
- Togo (1)
- Trinidad and Tobago (8)
- Tunisia (3)
- Turkey (4)
- Turkmenistan (2)
- Turks and Caicos Islands (1)
- Ukraine (10)
- United States (64)
- Uruguay (1)
- U.S. Virgin Islands (1)
- Uzbekistan (6)
- Venezuela (5)
- Yemen (1)
- FR Yugoslavia (5)
- Zambia (2)
- Zimbabwe (2)
