= 2006 IAAF World Indoor Championships – Men's 4 × 400 metres relay =

The Men's 4 × 400 metres relay event at the 2006 IAAF World Indoor Championships was held on March 12.

== Medalists ==
Gold	Silver	Bronze
United States; Tyree Washington; LaShawn Merritt; Milton Campbell; Wallace Spearmon; James Davis*; O.J. Hogans*	Poland; Daniel Dąbrowski; Marcin Marciniszyn; Rafał Wieruszewski; Piotr Klimczak; Paweł Ptak*; Piotr Kędzia*	Russia; Konstantin Svechkar; Aleksandr Derevyagin; Yevgeniy Lebedev; Dmitry Petrov; Andrey Polukeyev*

* Runners who participated in the heats only and received medals.

== Results ==
=== Heats ===
Qualification: First 2 teams of each heat (Q) plus the next 2 fastest (q) advance to the final. The heats were started at 10:41.

Rank	Heat	Nation	Athletes	Time	Notes
1	2	United States	James Davis, O.J. Hogans, Tyree Washington, Wallace Spearmon	3:03.66	Q
2	2	Poland	Paweł Ptak, Piotr Klimczak, Piotr Kędzia, Rafał Wieruszewski	3:06.10	Q, SB
3	2	Sweden	Joni Jaako, Johan Wissman, Andreas Mokdasi, Mattias Claesson	3:07.10	q, NR
4	2	Dominican Republic	Arismendy Peguero, Yoel Tapia, Pedro Mejía, Carlos Santa	3:07.87	q, NR
5	1	Russia	Konstantin Svechkar, Andrey Polukeyev, Aleksandr Derevyagin, Yevgeniy Lebedev	3:08.02	Q, SB
6	1	France	Brice Panel, Sébastien Maillard, Teddy Venel, Fadil Bellaabouss	3:08.06	Q, SB
7	1	Spain	Santiago Ezquerro, David Canal, Salvador Rodríguez, David Testa	3:08.07	
8	1	Ukraine	Myhaylo Knysh, Volodymyr Demchenko, Vitaliy Dubonosov, Oleksiy Rachkovsky	3:09.46	NR
9	1	Romania	Florin Suciu, Vasile Bobos, Alexandru Mardan, Ioan Vieru	3:13.93	NR
	1	Jamaica	DeWayne Barrett, Ricardo Williams, Sanjay Ayre, Lanceford Spence	DNF	
	2	Bahamas	Dennis Darling, Troy McIntosh, Timothy Munnings, Nathaniel McKinney	DNF	

=== Final ===
The final was started at 17:55 on March 12.

Rank	Nation	Athletes	Time	Notes
1st place, gold medalist(s)	United States	Tyree Washington, LaShawn Merritt, Milton Campbell, Wallace Spearmon	3:03.24	
2nd place, silver medalist(s)	Poland	Daniel Dąbrowski, Marcin Marciniszyn, Rafał Wieruszewski, Piotr Klimczak	3:04.67	SB
3rd place, bronze medalist(s)	Russia	Konstantin Svechkar, Aleksandr Derevyagin, Yevgeniy Lebedev, Dmitry Petrov	3:06.91	SB
4	Sweden	Joni Jaako, Johan Wissman, Andreas Mokdasi, Mattias Claesson	3:07.32	
5	Dominican Republic	Arismendy Peguero, Danis García, Juan Betances, Carlos Santa	3:08.47	
6	France	Brice Panel, Sébastien Maillard, Teddy Venel, Fadil Bellaabouss	3:09.55	
