= Athletics at the 2005 Summer Universiade – Men's 4 × 400 metres relay =

The men's 4 × 400 metres relay event at the 2005 Summer Universiade was held on 19–20 August in İzmir, Turkey.

== Medalists ==
Gold	Silver	Bronze
Poland; Rafał Wieruszewski; Daniel Dąbrowski; Piotr Kędzia; Piotr Klimczak	Japan; Kazunori Ota; Yoshihiro Horigome; Yuki Yamaguchi; Kenji Narisako; Shinji Takahira*	Russia; Dmitriy Petrov; Aleksandr Borshchenko; Konstantin Svechkar; Vladislav Frolov; Mikhail Lipskiy*

* Athletes who appeared in heats only.

== Results ==
=== Heats ===
Rank	Heat	Nation	Athletes	Time	Notes
1	1	Russia	Aleksandr Borshchenko, Vladislav Frolov, Mikhail Lipskiy, Dmitriy Petrov	3:04.98	Q
2	1	Japan	Shinji Takahira, Yuki Yamaguchi, Yoshihiro Horigome, Kazunori Ota	3:05.02	Q
3	1	Jamaica	Orion Nicely, Marvin Essor, Gregory Little, Dewayne Barrett	3:06.28	q
4	2	Poland	Piotr Klimczak, Daniel Dąbrowski, Piotr Kędzia, Rafał Wieruszewski	3:07.66	Q
5	1	Canada	Nathan Vadeboncoeur, David Shanks, Ray Ardill, Neil Hurtubise	3:08.05	q
6	1	Belarus	Sergey Kozlov, Maksim Lynsha, Sergei Nestserov, Leanid Viarshinin	3:08.27	q
7	1	Switzerland	Stéphane Borloz, Cédric El-Idrissi, Christian Grossenbacher, Pierre Lavanchy	3:09.44	q
8	2	Kazakhstan	Boris Khamzin, Mihail Kolganov, Denis Rypakov, Yevgeniy Meleshenko	3:09.95	Q
9	2	Czech Republic	Stanislav Sajdok, Jiří Vojtík, Ondřej Daněk, Rudolf Götz	3:10.29	
10	1	New Zealand	Cory Innes, Sam Rapson, Tim Hawkes, Andrew Moore	3:10.33	
11	2	Thailand	Jukkatip Phocharoen, Weera Kongsri, Viriya Permpool, Suphachai Phachsai	3:11.28	
12	2	Nigeria	Ahmed Ajiboye, Mathew Dada, Tony Ogbu, Setoma Briggs	3:12.41	
13	1	Turkey	Hakan Karacaoğlu, Ömer Yalçıner, İsmail Aslan, Tuncay Örs	3:16.57	
14	2	Hong Kong	Fan Wai Ho, Lui Ka Ho, Szeto Man Ho, Lau Tak Lung	3:22.63	
	2	Iran	Mohamed Akefian, Behrooz Mahdavi, Abolfazl Dehnavi, Ehsan Mohajer Shojaei	DNF	

=== Final ===
Rank	Nation	Athletes	Time	Notes
1st place, gold medalist(s)	Poland	Rafał Wieruszewski, Daniel Dąbrowski, Piotr Kędzia, Piotr Klimczak	3:02.57	
2nd place, silver medalist(s)	Japan	Kazunori Ota, Yoshihiro Horigome, Yuki Yamaguchi, Kenji Narisako	3:03.20	
3rd place, bronze medalist(s)	Russia	Dmitriy Petrov, Aleksandr Borshchenko, Konstantin Svechkar, Vladislav Frolov	3:03.33	
4	Jamaica	Orion Nicely, Marvin Essor, Gregory Little, Dewayne Barrett	3:03.93	
5	Switzerland	Stéphane Borloz, Martin Leiser, Pierre Lavanchy, Cédric El-Idrissi	3:07.60	
6	Belarus	Andrey Kozlovskiy, Sergei Nestserov, Sergey Kozlov, Leanid Viarshinin	3:08.48	
7	Kazakhstan	Boris Khamzin, Mihail Kolganov, Denis Rypakov, Yevgeniy Meleshenko	3:09.92	
	Canada	Nathan Vadeboncoeur, David Shanks, Ray Ardill, Neil Hurtubise	DNF	
