= Athletics at the 2003 Summer Universiade – Men's 400 metres =

400 metres race in South Korea

The men's 400 metres event at the 2003 Summer Universiade was held in Daegu, South Korea with the final on 25–27 August.

== Medalists ==
Gold	Silver	Bronze
Andriy Tverdostup; Ukraine	Denis Rypakov; Kazakhstan	Rafał Wieruszewski; Poland

== Results ==
=== Heats ===
Rank	Heat	Athlete	Nationality	Time	Notes
1	1	Igor Vasilyev	Russia	47.08	Q
2	1	James Chatt	Great Britain	47.18	Q
3	4	Volodymyr Demchenko	Ukraine	47.22	Q
4	1	Jan Mazanec	Czech Republic	47.31	Q
5	3	Christian Birk	Denmark	47.43	Q
6	3	Marco Salvucci	Italy	47.46	Q
7	6	Andriy Tverdostup	Ukraine	47.47	Q
8	3	Mohd Zainal Abidin Zaiful	Malaysia	47.52	Q
9	6	Narong Nilploy	Thailand	47.67	Q
10	4	Sergey Babayev	Russia	47.71	Q
11	4	Denis Rypakov	Kazakhstan	47.72	Q
12	6	François Gourmet	Belgium	47.79	Q
13	6	Yoshiaki Kitaoka	Japan	47.88	Q
14	5	Adam Potter	Great Britain	48.08	Q
15	5	Yoshihiro Horigome	Japan	48.09	Q
16	4	Matiuupi Katjiyuongua	Namibia	48.12	Q
17	3	Nathan Vadeboncoeur	Canada	48.13	Q
18	6	Marvin Essor	Jamaica	48.15	q
19	5	Luca Galletti	Italy	48.19	Q
20	4	Jonnie Lowe	Honduras	48.26	q
21	2	Rafał Wieruszewski	Poland	48.31	Q
22	5	Sam Higgie	New Zealand	48.39	Q
23	1	Tim Hawkes	New Zealand	48.44	Q
24	2	Dávid Csesznegi	Hungary	48.52	Q
25	3	Valentin Bulichev	Azerbaijan	48.64	q
26	2	Banjong Lachua	Thailand	48.66	Q
27	5	Mikk Joorits	Estonia	48.80	q
28	4	Stephen Adjei	Ghana	49.09	q
29	4	Saeed Ali Al-Adhreai	Yemen	49.21	q, NR
30	1	Nikolai Portelli	Malta	49.22	q
31	3	Shon Jung-ho	South Korea	49.32	q
32	6	Teu Koon Kiat	Singapore	49.89	
33	6	Karl Farrugia	Malta	50.08	
34	5	Kenneth Khoo Kian Seong	Singapore	50.09	
35	2	Avetik Arakelian	Armenia	50.57	Q
36	3	Cheong Man Fong	Macau	51.23	
37	4	Chan Chi Hong	Hong Kong	51.99	
38	1	Adam Abubaker	Sudan	52.83	
39	6	S. M. P. S. D. Pathirana	Sri Lanka	53.05	
40	2	Chang Wa Ieng	Macau	53.99	
41	2	Vajira Kularatne	Sri Lanka	54.06	
42	1	Trent Armstrong	Marshall Islands	55.11	
	2	Mohamed Al-Aswad	United Arab Emirates	DQ	
	5	Lolo Ekanga	Democratic Republic of the Congo	DNS	
	5	Thomas Kortbeek	Netherlands	DNS	

=== Quarterfinals ===
Rank	Heat	Athlete	Nationality	Time	Notes
1	2	Andriy Tverdostup	Ukraine	46.65	Q
2	3	Denis Rypakov	Kazakhstan	46.70	Q
3	3	Volodymyr Demchenko	Ukraine	46.77	Q
4	2	Marvin Essor	Jamaica	46.87	Q
5	4	Rafał Wieruszewski	Poland	46.93	Q
6	4	François Gourmet	Belgium	47.04	Q
7	2	Sergey Babayev	Russia	47.14	Q
8	2	James Chatt	Great Britain	47.14	q
9	1	Narong Nilploy	Thailand	47.15	Q
10	3	Adam Potter	Great Britain	47.21	Q
11	4	Christian Birk	Denmark	47.27	Q
12	4	Jan Mazanec	Czech Republic	47.29	q
13	4	Yoshiaki Kitaoka	Japan	47.30	q
14	1	Dávid Csesznegi	Hungary	47.38	Q
15	1	Igor Vasilyev	Russia	47.51	Q
16	1	Mohd Zainal Abidin Zaiful	Malaysia	47.62	q
17	2	Yoshihiro Horigome	Japan	47.63	
17	3	Mikk Joorits	Estonia	47.63	
19	1	Matuupi Katjiyongua	Namibia	47.90	
20	1	Luca Galletti	Italy	47.98	
21	2	Banjong Lachua	Thailand	48.11	
22	1	Valentin Bulichev	Azerbaijan	48.15	
23	3	Marco Salvucci	Italy	48.18	
24	3	Nathan Vadeboncoeur	Canada	48.18	
25	2	Tim Hawkes	New Zealand	48.55	
26	3	Sam Higgie	New Zealand	48.79	
27	4	Jonnie Lowe	Honduras	48.83	
28	2	Son Jung-ho	South Korea	49.15	
29	3	Nikolai Portelli	Malta	51.12	
	4	Stephen Adjei	Ghana	?	
	4	Saeed Ali Al-Adhreai	Yemen	?	
	1	Avetik Arakelian	Armenia	DNS	

=== Semifinals ===
Rank	Heat	Athlete	Nationality	Time	Notes
1	1	Andriy Tverdostup	Ukraine	46.82	Q
2	2	Volodymyr Demchenko	Ukraine	46.58	Q
3	2	Rafał Wieruszewski	Poland	46.64	Q
4	2	Denis Rypakov	Kazakhstan	46.78	Q
5	2	Christian Birk	Denmark	46.80	Q
6	2	Igor Vasilyev	Russia	46.89	
7	1	Adam Potter	Great Britain	46.99	Q
8	1	Marvin Essor	Jamaica	47.25	Q
9	1	Dávid Csesznegi	Hungary	47.33	Q
10	1	Sergey Babayev	Russia	47.63	
11	2	François Gourmet	Belgium	47.67	
12	2	Jan Mazanec	Czech Republic	47.89	
13	2	Yoshiaki Kitaoka	Japan	47.97	
14	1	James Chatt	Great Britain	48.03	
15	1	Mohd Zainal Abidin Zaiful	Malaysia	48.82	
	1	Narong Nilploy	Thailand	DNS	

=== Final ===
Rank	Lane	Athlete	Nationality	Time	Notes
1st place, gold medalist(s)	6	Andriy Tverdostup	Ukraine	46.08	
2nd place, silver medalist(s)	7	Denis Rypakov	Kazakhstan	46.51	
3rd place, bronze medalist(s)	5	Rafał Wieruszewski	Poland	46.53	
4	3	Adam Potter	Great Britain	46.64	
5	4	Volodymyr Demchenko	Ukraine	46.82	
6	8	Christian Birk	Denmark	46.98	
7	1	Dávid Csesznegi	Hungary	47.50	
8	2	Marvin Essor	Jamaica	48.01	
