= Athletics at the 2005 Summer Universiade – Men's 400 metres =

The men's 400 metres event at the 2005 Summer Universiade was held on 15–17 August in İzmir, Turkey.

== Medalists ==
Gold	Silver	Bronze
Marvin Essor; Jamaica	Dewayne Barrett; Jamaica	Yuki Yamaguchi; Japan

== Results ==
=== Heats ===
Rank	Heat	Athlete	Nationality	Time	Notes
1	5	Marvin Essor	Jamaica	46.25	Q
2	5	Nils Duerinck	Belgium	46.53	Q
3	7	Cédric Van Branteghem	Belgium	46.71	Q
4	4	Wang Xiaoxu	China	46.78	Q
5	8	Tunde Ogbu	Nigeria	46.95	Q, PB
6	5	Kazunori Ota	Japan	46.98	q
7	7	Nathan Vadeboncoeur	Canada	47.12	Q
8	9	Dewayne Barrett	Jamaica	47.13	Q
9	7	Mohammad Akefian	Iran	47.15	q
10	5	Tim Hawkes	New Zealand	47.18	q, SB
11	4	Ehsan Mohajer Shojaei	Iran	47.24	Q
12	9	Daniel Dąbrowski	Poland	47.36	Q
13	4	Piotr Kędzia	Poland	47.47	q
14	1	Luis Ambrósio	Brazil	47.49	Q
15	9	Konstantin Svechkar	Russia	47.50	q
16	8	Andriy Tverdostup	Ukraine	47.56	Q
17	1	Yuki Yamaguchi	Japan	47.63	Q
18	9	Cory Innes	New Zealand	47.64	q
19	9	Ray Ardill	Canada	47.67	
20	7	Ömer Yalçiner	Turkey	47.90	
21	3	Tom Coman	Ireland	47.96	Q
22	1	Stéphane Borloz	Switzerland	47.97	PB
23	8	Félix Martínez	Puerto Rico	48.00	
24	3	Boris Khamzin	Kazakhstan	48.22	Q
25	5	Jonnie Lowe	Honduras	48.29	SB
25	6	Pierre Lavanchy	Switzerland	48.29	Q
27	6	Vladislav Frolov	Russia	48.44	Q
28	3	Asad Iqbal	Pakistan	48.57	SB
29	6	Jukkatip Phocharoen	Thailand	48.87	
30	3	Weera Kongsri	Thailand	48.90	SB
31	4	Denis Rypakov	Kazakhstan	48.92	
32	7	Marco Vinicio Pérez	Costa Rica	49.13	
33	5	Francis Ahmed	Nigeria	49.25	
34	8	Camilo Quevedo	Guatemala	49.33	
34	6	Jacob Fabricius Riis	Denmark	49.38	
36	2	Zoltán Borsányi	Hungary	49.40	Q
37	5	Avetik Arakelian	Armenia	49.41	
38	8	Hamad Al-Badwawi	United Arab Emirates	49.70	
39	3	Alex Fan Wai Ho	Hong Kong	49.92	
40	1	Julius Kasule	Uganda	50.53	
41	1	Mohamed Tamin	Lebanon	50.58	
42	8	Timothy Szeto Man Ho	Hong Kong	51.17	
43	3	Adam Mohamed El-Hassan	Sudan	51.36	
44	1	Ali Muhammad	Pakistan	51.74	
45	4	Telguy Djibeng	Chad	56.53	
46	6	Maher Tamim	Lebanon	57.07	
47	2	Andrew Opata	Uganda	1:39.99	Q
	2	Bobby Young	Liberia	DQ	

=== Semifinals ===
Rank	Heat	Athlete	Nationality	Time	Notes
1	1	Marvin Essor	Jamaica	46.45	Q
2	3	Yuki Yamaguchi	Japan	46.50	Q
3	2	Dewayne Barrett	Jamaica	46.56	Q
4	1	Tom Coman	Ireland	46.64	Q
4	2	Cédric Van Branteghem	Belgium	46.64	Q
6	3	Piotr Kędzia	Poland	46.71	Q
7	3	Mohammad Akefian	Iran	46.73	q
8	2	Andriy Tverdostup	Ukraine	46.75	q
9	3	Nils Duerinck	Belgium	46.79	
10	2	Nathan Vadeboncoeur	Canada	46.85	
11	3	Wang Xiaoxu	China	46.93	
12	3	Zoltán Borsányi	Hungary	47.09	
13	1	Daniel Dąbrowski	Poland	47.12	
14	3	Tunde Ogbu	Nigeria	47.31	
15	2	Pierre Lavanchy	Switzerland	47.32	
16	1	Luis Ambrósio	Brazil	47.43	
17	1	Konstantin Svechkar	Russia	47.57	
18	2	Cory Innes	New Zealand	47.63	
19	1	Kazunori Ota	Japan	47.69	
20	1	Tim Hawkes	New Zealand	47.94	
21	3	Boris Khamzin	Kazakhstan	48.18	
22	2	Andrew Opata	Uganda	50.43	
	1	Ehsan Mohajer Shojaei	Iran	DNF	
	2	Vladislav Frolov	Russia	DNS	

=== Final ===
Rank	Athlete	Nationality	Time	Notes
1st place, gold medalist(s)	Marvin Essor	Jamaica	45.99	
2nd place, silver medalist(s)	Dewayne Barrett	Jamaica	46.14	
3rd place, bronze medalist(s)	Yuki Yamaguchi	Japan	46.15	SB
4	Cédric Van Branteghem	Belgium	46.17	
5	Andriy Tverdostup	Ukraine	46.55	
6	Tom Coman	Ireland	46.75	
7	Piotr Kędzia	Poland	46.89	
8	Mohammad Akefian	Iran	47.14	
