= Athletics at the 2011 Summer Universiade – Men's 400 metres =

The men's 400 metres event at the 2011 Summer Universiade was held on 11–13 August.

== Medalists ==
Gold	Silver	Bronze
Marcell Deák-Nagy; Hungary	Peter Matthews; Jamaica	Sean Wroe; Australia

== Results ==
=== Heats ===
Qualification: First 2 in each heat and 8 best performers advance to the Semifinals.

Rank	Heat	Name	Nationality	Time	Notes
1	6	Peter Matthews	Jamaica	46.35	Q
2	8	Brian Gregan	Ireland	46.37	Q
2	2	Joey Jacob Hughes	United States	46.37	Q
4	8	Obakeng Ngwigwa	Botswana	46.48	Q, SB
5	2	Serdar Tamaç	Turkey	46.55	Q
6	4	Valentin Kruglyakov	Russia	46.57	Q
7	2	Thapelo Ketlogetswe	Botswana	46.72	q
8	2	Emmanuel Tugumisirize	Uganda	46.77	q, PB
9	4	Willem de Beer	South Africa	46.85	Q
10	8	Shane Victor	South Africa	46.90	q
11	4	Yavuz Can	Turkey	46.94	q
12	5	Chang Pengben	China	46.98	Q
12	3	Sean Wroe	Australia	46.98	Q
14	6	Hiroyuki Nakano	Japan	47.08	Q
15	7	Augusto Stanley	Paraguay	47.11	Q
16	5	Anderson Henriques	Brazil	47.12	Q
17	6	Michael Robertson	Canada	47.20	q
17	5	Rafith Rodríguez	Colombia	47.20	q
19	1	Marcell Deák-Nagy	Hungary	47.23	Q
20	1	Liemarvin Bonevacia	Netherlands Antilles	47.25	Q
21	1	Dmitry Buryak	Russia	47.29	q
22	3	Hideyuki Hirose	Japan	47.36	Q
23	3	Nicklas Hyde	Denmark	47.39	q
24	4	Su Ronghai	China	47.42	
25	7	Antoine Gillet	Belgium	47.46	Q
26	7	Krasimir Braykov	Bulgaria	47.53	
27	1	Jānis Baltušs	Latvia	47.84	
28	6	Jacob Riis	Denmark	47.94	
29	5	Yuvaraaj Panerselvam	Malaysia	48.22	
30	4	Lee Moo-Yong	South Korea	48.29	
31	5	Jonas Andre Grønnhaug	Norway	48.54	
32	7	Martin Zacests	Latvia	48.76	
33	2	Gary Robinson	Costa Rica	48.95	
34	8	Muhammad Yunus Lasaleh	Malaysia	49.16	
35	5	Ramzi Naim	Lebanon	49.17	PB
35	6	Gideon Ernst Narib	Namibia	49.17	
37	3	Seong Hyeok-Je	South Korea	49.18	
38	8	Julio Pérez	Peru	49.19	
39	2	Rivar Tipp	Estonia	49.38	
40	8	Manqoba Benni Nyoni	Swaziland	49.59	
41	6	Pius Ocilaje	Uganda	49.64	
42	2	Ratutira Narara	Fiji	49.71	
43	6	Hamad Albadwawi	United Arab Emirates	49.73	
44	7	Hussain Ahmed Masrahi	Saudi Arabia	50.65	
45	5	Christopher Svensson	Sweden	51.05	
46	8	Hammam Hassan Al Farsi	Oman	51.24	
47	3	Pule Rantseli	Lesotho	51.27	
48	1	James Anyona Getengah	Kenya	51.81	
49	3	Dennis Chelimo	Kenya	52.25	
50	7	Sathasivam Sivashanger	Sri Lanka	52.65	
51	1	Bob Niamali Madrakile	DR Congo	53.29	
52	6	Lei Honweng	Macau	53.77	
53	4	Mohammedd Abdul Momin Mamun	Bangladesh	54.04	
54	3	Chang Infong	Macau	54.07	
55	1	Jason McCaffrey	Micronesia	55.22	
56	7	Ahmed Said Al Azri	Oman	1:01.52	
	4	Mohammed Abubakari	Ghana	DNS	
	8	Robert Annak	Ghana	DNS	
	7	Marc Orozco	Spain	DNS	

=== Semifinals ===
Official Semifinals Video

Qualification: First 2 of each semifinal (Q) and the next 2 fastest (q) qualified for the final.

Rank	Heat	Name	Nationality	Time	Notes
1	1	Marcell Deák-Nagy	Hungary	45.86	Q
2	1	Sean Wroe	Australia	45.98	Q, SB
3	2	Brian Gregan	Ireland	46.00	Q, PB
4	1	Joey Jacob Hughes	United States	46.06	q
5	2	Valentin Kruglyakov	Russia	46.07	Q, SB
6	3	Anderson Henriques	Brazil	46.14	Q
7	3	Peter Matthews	Jamaica	46.21	Q
8	2	Obakeng Ngwigwa	Botswana	46.47	q
9	3	Shane Victor	South Africa	46.48	
10	1	Yavuz Can	Turkey	46.55	PB
11	1	Willem de Beer	South Africa	46.59	
12	3	Hiroyuki Nakano	Japan	46.61	
13	3	Chang Pengben	China	46.73	
14	1	Dmitry Buryak	Russia	46.84	
15	3	Emmanuel Tugumisirize	Uganda	46.91	
16	2	Serdar Tamaç	Turkey	46.98	
17	2	Hideyuki Hirose	Japan	47.07	
18	3	Augusto Stanley	Paraguay	47.16	
19	2	Antoine Gillet	Belgium	47.37	
20	3	Nicklas Hyde	Denmark	47.50	
21	2	Michael Robertson	Canada	47.52	
22	1	Liemarvin Bonevacia	Netherlands Antilles	48.26	
	2	Rafith Rodríguez	Colombia	DNF	
	1	Thapelo Ketlogetswe	Botswana	DQ	FS

=== Final ===
Official Video

Rank	Lane	Name	Nationality	Time	Notes
1st place, gold medalist(s)	3	Marcell Deák-Nagy	Hungary	45.50	
2nd place, silver medalist(s)	8	Peter Matthews	Jamaica	45.62	PB
3rd place, bronze medalist(s)	6	Sean Wroe	Australia	45.93	SB
4	7	Valentin Kruglyakov	Russia	45.94	PB
5	5	Brian Gregan	Ireland	45.96	PB
6	2	Joey Jacob Hughes	United States	45.99	
7	4	Anderson Henriques	Brazil	46.01	
8	1	Obakeng Ngwigwa	Botswana	46.51	
