= Athletics at the 2011 Summer Universiade – Men's 4 × 400 metres relay =

The men's 4 x 400 metres relay event at the 2011 Summer Universiade was held on 20–21 August.

== Medalists ==
Gold	Silver	Bronze
Russia; Aleksandr Sigalovskiy; Dmitry Buryak; Artem Vazhov; Valentin Kruglyakov; Aleksey Kenig*	Japan; Hiroyuki Nakano; Shintaro Horie; Hideyuki Hirose; Takatoshi Abe	South Africa; Shane Victor; André Olivier; Pieter Beneke; Willem de Beer; Tlou Seloba*

* Athletes who competed in heats only and received medals.

== Results ==
=== Heats ===
Qualification: First 3 teams of each heat (Q) plus the next 2 fastest (q) qualified for the final.

Rank	Heat	Nation	Athletes	Time	Notes
1	1	Japan	Hiroyuki Nakano, Shintaro Horie, Hideyuki Hirose, Takatoshi Abe	3:08.02	Q
2	1	South Africa	Shane Victor, Tlou Seloba, Pieter Beneke, Willem de Beer	3:09.76	Q
3	2	Russia	Aleksey Kenig, Dmitry Buryak, Artem Vazhov, Valentin Kruglyakov	3:10.85	Q
4	2	Botswana	Tirafalo Batsholelwang, Obakeng Ngwigwa, Keene Motukisi, Thapelo Ketlogetswe	3:11.76	Q
5	2	Great Britain	Niall Flannery, David Bishop, Rion Pierre, Joe Thomas	3:12.68	Q
6	1	South Korea	Lee Jaeha, Lee Mooyong, Seong Hyeokje, Choi Suchang	3:14.40	Q
7	2	Saudi Arabia	Abdou Ahmed Masrahi, Ali Hulayyil Alboqami, Hussain Ahmed Masrahi, Mohammed Ali Dakkam	3:26.20	q
8	2	Sri Lanka	Dinesh Gamacharige, Mahesh Walahanduwa, Tyrrone Tharmarathnam, Sathasivam Sivashanger	3:26.56	q
9	1	Oman	Said Al Mandhari, Qais Abdullah Al Rawahi, Ahmed Said Al Azri, Hammam Hassan Al Azri	3:27.87	
	1	United States	Justin Murdock, Jeshua Anderson, Joey Hughes, Ryan Martin	DQ	170.9
	2	Ghana	Robert Annak, Mohammed Abubakari, Robert Dwumfour, Ernest Amissah	DQ	170.9
	2	Malaysia	Muhammad Fikri Rusli, Mohd Zabidi Ghazali, Karthik Jayamaran, Mohd Jironi Riduan	DQ	170.9
	1	China	Chen Dayu, Liu Huawei, Su Ronghai, Chang Pengben	DNS	
	1	Canada		DNS	

=== Final ===
Rank	Nation	Athletes	Time	Notes
1st place, gold medalist(s)	Russia	Aleksandr Sigalovskiy, Dmitry Buryak, Artem Vazhov, Valentin Kruglyakov	3:04.51	
2nd place, silver medalist(s)	Japan	Hiroyuki Nakano, Shintaro Horie, Hideyuki Hirose, Takatoshi Abe	3:05.16	
3rd place, bronze medalist(s)	South Africa	Shane Victor, André Olivier, Pieter Beneke, Willem de Beer	3:05.61	
4	Botswana	Tirafalo Batsholelwang, Obakeng Ngwigwa, Otlaadisa Segosebe, Thapelo Ketlogetswe	3:07.13	
5	Great Britain	Niall Flannery, Gianni Frankis, Rion Pierre, Joe Thomas	3:08.68	
6	South Korea	Lee Mooyong, Seong Hyeokje, Choi Suchang, Lee Jaeha	3:12.86	
7	Sri Lanka	Dinesh Gamacharige, Mahesh Walahanduwa, Tyrrone Tharmarathnam, Sathasivam Sivashanger	3:27.54	
	Saudi Arabia		DNS	
