= Athletics at the 2007 Summer Universiade – Men's 400 metres =

The men's 400 metres event at the 2007 Summer Universiade was held on 9–11 August.

== Medalists ==
Gold	Silver	Bronze
Sean Wroe; Australia	Piotr Klimczak; Poland	Dmitry Buryak; Russia

== Results ==
=== Heats ===
Qualification: First 3 of each heat (Q) and the next 3 fastest (q) qualified for the semifinals.

Rank	Heat	Name	Nationality	Time	Notes
1	6	Richard Buck	Great Britain	46.20	Q
2	6	Dylan Grant	Australia	46.43	Q
3	5	Sean Wroe	Australia	46.56	Q
4	5	Dmitry Buryak	Russia	46.56	Q, SB
5	3	Rahmani Miloud	Algeria	46.80	Q
6	1	Andrew Dargie	Canada	46.99	Q
7	2	Piotr Klimczak	Poland	47.06	Q
8	3	Maksim Aleksandrenko	Russia	47.08	Q
9	1	Willem de Beer	South Africa	47.11	Q
10	6	Mohammad Akefian	Iran	47.30	Q
11	3	Wang Xiaoxu	China	47.36	Q
12	2	Fayçal Cherifi	Algeria	47.40	Q
13	5	Félix Martínez	Puerto Rico	47.43	Q
14	7	Sebastijan Jagarinec	Slovenia	47.44	Q
15	1	Julius Mutekanga	Uganda	47.53	Q
16	1	Waisea Finau	Fiji	47.62	q
17	2	Marouane El Maadadi	Morocco	47.63	Q, PB
18	4	Rudolf Götz	Czech Republic	47.68	Q
19	1	Jukkatip Pojaroen	Thailand	47.74	q
20	5	Marco Moraglio	Italy	47.75	q
21	2	Fuseihi Bawah	Ghana	47.78	
22	7	Teo Turchi	Italy	47.79	Q
23	4	Piotr Kędzia	Poland	47.81	Q
24	7	Matthias Bos	Germany	47.83	Q
25	1	Bobby Young	Liberia	47.87	
25	3	Jacob Riis	Denmark	47.87	
26	4	Matthew Boateng	Ghana	48.06	Q
27	7	Mohd Zainal Abidin Zaiful	Malaysia	48.12	
28	5	Mohd Zafril Zualani	Malaysia	48.24	
29	7	Mart Kroodo	Estonia	48.28	PB
30	4	Muhammad Abduljaleel	Liberia	48.46	
31	3	Khoo Kian Seong Kenneth	Singapore	48.55	
32	6	Julius Kasule	Uganda	48.63	
33	2	Waldy Lindeborg	Netherlands Antilles	48.72	
34	4	Steffen Jorgensen	Denmark	48.86	
35	1	Jonathan Loor	Ecuador	49.74	
36	5	Frank Puriza	Namibia	49.77	
37	7	Emnignuel Karngar	Liberia	50.08	
38	5	Camilo Quevedo	Guatemala	50.22	
39	4	Teng Wei Yang Alexander	Singapore	50.28	
40	7	Leung Ki Ho	Hong Kong	50.32	
41	6	Sornsak Koonkaew	Thailand	50.59	
42	2	Muhammad Nabeel	Pakistan	50.80	
43	3	Hilary Wesonga Weguld	Kenya	50.92	
44	1	Mduduzi Sunday Matse	Swaziland	51.12	
45	6	Atanasius Kangala	Namibia	51.29	
46	5	Lui Ka Ho	Hong Kong	51.57	PB
47	7	Heditiana Rampy Andrianjaka	Madagascar	52.80	
48	3	Djimadoum Rodoum	Chad	53.39	SB
	2	Kurt Couto	Mozambique	DNS	
	2	Cyrus Wesley	Liberia	DNS	
	3	Bhartha Reddy	India	DNS	
	4	Adam Refat Adam	Sudan	DNS	
	4	David Testa	Spain	DNS	
	6	Pierre Lavanchy	Switzerland	DNS	
	6	David McCarthy	Ireland	DNS	

=== Semifinals ===
Qualification: First 2 of each semifinal (Q) and the next 2 fastest (q) qualified for the final.

Rank	Heat	Name	Nationality	Time	Notes
1	3	Sean Wroe	Australia	45.96	Q
2	3	Piotr Klimczak	Poland	46.09	Q, SB
3	1	Dylan Grant	Australia	46.29	Q
4	3	Willem de Beer	South Africa	46.31	q, PB
5	1	Dmitry Buryak	Russia	46.33	Q, SB
6	2	Richard Buck	Great Britain	46.41	Q
7	2	Piotr Kędzia	Poland	46.51	Q
8	2	Rudolf Götz	Czech Republic	46.71	q
9	1	Rahmani Miloud	Algeria	46.72	
10	2	Sebastijan Jagarinec	Slovenia	46.79	PB
11	3	Maksim Aleksandrenko	Russia	46.87	
12	1	Andrew Dargie	Canada	46.91	
13	1	Wang Xiaoxu	China	47.00	
13	3	Félix Martínez	Puerto Rico	47.00	
15	3	Teo Turchi	Italy	47.10	
16	1	Mohammad Akefian	Iran	47.21	
17	2	Fayçal Cherifi	Algeria	47.33	
18	1	Waisea Finau	Fiji	47.44	
19	2	Marco Moraglio	Italy	47.64	
20	2	Marouane El Maadadi	Morocco	47.66	
21	2	Julius Mutekanga	Uganda	47.67	
22	3	Jukkatip Pojaroen	Thailand	47.82	
23	1	Matthew Boateng	Ghana	48.19	
24	3	Matthias Bos	Germany	48.59	

=== Final ===
Rank	Lane	Name	Nationality	Time	Notes
1st place, gold medalist(s)	5	Sean Wroe	Australia	45.49	
2nd place, silver medalist(s)	6	Piotr Klimczak	Poland	46.06	SB
3rd place, bronze medalist(s)	8	Dmitry Buryak	Russia	46.22	
4	7	Willem de Beer	South Africa	46.31	
5	4	Dylan Grant	Australia	46.35	
6	3	Richard Buck	Great Britain	46.53	
7	2	Piotr Kędzia	Poland	46.85	
8	1	Rudolf Götz	Czech Republic	48.07	
