= Athletics at the 2007 Summer Universiade – Men's 4 × 400 metres relay =

The men's 4 × 400 metres relay event at the 2007 Summer Universiade was held on 13–14 July.

== Medalists ==
Gold	Silver	Bronze
Poland; Witold Bańka; Piotr Klimczak; Piotr Kędzia; Daniel Dąbrowski; Wojciech Chybiński*	Australia; Dylan Grant; Mark Ormrod; Joel Milburn; Sean Wroe; Tristan Thomas*	Russia; Maksim Aleksandrenko; Valentin Kruglyakov; Vladimir Antmanis; Dmitry Buryak; Ruslan Bayazitov*; Viacheslav Sakaev*

*Athletes who participated in heats only.

== Results ==
=== Heats ===
Qualification: First 2 teams of each heat (Q) plus the next 2 fastest (q) qualified for the final.

Rank	Heat	Nation	Athletes	Time	Notes
1	3	Poland	Witold Bańka, Wojciech Chybiński, Piotr Kędzia, Piotr Klimczak	3:07.32	Q
2	1	Australia	Joel Milburn, Mark Ormrod, Tristan Thomas, Dylan Grant	3:08.24	Q
3	1	Russia	Ruslan Bayazitov, Maksim Aleksandrenko, Viacheslav Sakaev, Dmitry Buryak	3:09.58	Q
4	1	Algeria	Fayçal Cherifi, Abderahmane Hamadi, Samir Khadar, Rahmani Miloud	3:11.04	q
5	2	Denmark	Steffen Jorgensen, Jacob Riis, Mare Lorentzen, Nicklas Hyde	3:11.21	Q
6	2	Thailand	Sornsak Koonkaew, Wiriya Permpool, Supachai Phachsay, Jukkatip Pojaroen	3:11.52	Q
7	2	South Africa	Mthobisi Baloyi, Hannes Dreyer, Hendrik Kotze, Willem de Beer	3:11.94	q
8	2	Liberia	Bobby Young, Muhammad Abduljaleel, Cyrus Wesley, Emnignuel Karngar	3:12.75	
9	3	Ghana	Fuseihi Bawah, Matthew Boateng, Eugene Ricky Asante, Kester Owusu Boateng	3:13.08	Q
10	2	Singapore	Poh Seng Song, Khoo Kian Seong Kenneth, Teng Wei Yang Alexander, Subaish Rajamanickam	3:15.49	
11	3	Italy	Nicola Cascella, Teo Turchi, Markus Crepaz, Marco Moraglio	3:15.56	
12	3	Namibia	Horatius Abrahams, Atanasius Kangala, Chriswill De Wee, Frank Puriza	3:18.09	FS1
13	1	Sri Lanka	Rangana Jayathilaka, Priyanke Weerasinghe, Ezhilvalavan Inparajah, Nalin Thilakarathne	3:29.39	
14	1	Hong Kong	Lau Yu Leong, Lui Ka Ho, Wong Ka Chun, Gi Ka Man	3:39.09	
	1	Malaysia		DNS	
	2	Japan		DNS	
	3	Great Britain		DNS	
	3	Uganda		DNS	

=== Final ===
Rank	Nation	Athletes	Time	Notes
1st place, gold medalist(s)	Poland	Witold Bańka, Piotr Klimczak, Piotr Kędzia, Daniel Dąbrowski	3:02.05	
2nd place, silver medalist(s)	Australia	Dylan Grant, Mark Ormrod, Joel Milburn, Sean Wroe	3:02.76	
3rd place, bronze medalist(s)	Russia	Maksim Aleksandrenko, Valentin Kruglyakov, Vladimir Antmanis, Dmitry Buryak	3:05.04	
4	South Africa	Hendrik Kotze, Hannes Dreyer, Ockert Cilliers, Willem de Beer	3:06.44	
5	Algeria	Fayçal Cherifi, Abderahmane Hamadi, Nabil Madi, Rahmani Miloud	3:06.85	
6	Thailand	Tulapong Sutaso, Sornsak Koonkaew, Supachai Phachsay, Jukkatip Pojaroen	3:09.71	
7	Denmark	Steffen Jorgensen, Jacob Riis, Mare Lorentzen, Nicklas Hyde	3:09.73	SB
8	Ghana	Fuseihi Bawah, Matthew Boateng, Christopher Gyapong, Kester Owusu Boateng	3:11.38	
