= 2011 World Championships in Athletics – Men's 4 × 400 metres relay =

Official Video

The Men's 4 × 400 metres relay event at the 2011 World Championships in Athletics was held at the Daegu Stadium on 1 and 2 September. Thursday and Friday. This is a change in schedule from previous years when all the relays were at the end of the program. This might necessitate a change in strategy to allow for team members involved in other events.

This was the fastest qualifying round in the history of the World Championships. All eight qualifying teams were faster than the fastest qualifier two years before. All but final qualifier Kenya were faster than the Bronze medal team at that championship. United States ran the world leading time, which sounds more impressive than it really was since the previous leading time was by an American collegiate team (though only seven of these national teams were better than that mark in this entire competition). The South African team set their National Record, led off by double amputee Oscar Pistorius. After the heat, South Africa elected not to include Pistorius in the final.

In the finals, none of the medal winning teams matched their times from the qualifying heats. Jonathan Borlée put Belgium in the early lead. After the first handoff, they were passed quickly by Ofentse Mogawane putting South Africa into the lead followed by Jermaine Gonzales of Jamaica. Five time defending champion United States, running hurdlers Bershawn Jackson and Angelo Taylor, was a slow third place behind South Africa's Willem de Beer watching Jamaican Riker Hylton separate from the field, but Hylton tied up on the home stretch and the race tightened going into the final handoff. Taking the baton in the unfamiliar third place, Silver medalist LaShawn Merritt ran a controlled race in lane one moving into position for one final surge on the home stretch. Merritt was actually too close to the runners ahead of him and had to dart to the right to go around to pass the two teams in green and yellow to the finish. South Africa anchor, hurdler L. J. van Zyl, held off Jamaica's Leford Green for the silver medal.

== Medalists ==
Gold	Silver	Bronze
United States; Greg Nixon; Bershawn Jackson; Angelo Taylor; LaShawn Merritt; Jamaal Torrance*; Michael Berry*	South Africa; Shane Victor; Ofentse Mogawane; Willem de Beer; L. J. van Zyl; Oscar Pistorius*	Jamaica; Allodin Fothergill; Jermaine Gonzales; Riker Hylton; Leford Green; Lansford Spence*

== Records ==
World record	United States (Andrew Valmon, Quincy Watts, Harry Reynolds, Michael Johnson)	2:54.29	Stuttgart, Germany	22 August 1993
Championship record	United States (Andrew Valmon, Quincy Watts, Harry Reynolds, Michael Johnson)	2:54.29	Stuttgart, Germany	22 August 1993
World leading	Texas A&M University (Bryan Miller, Tabarie Henry, Michael Preble, Demetrius Pinder)	3:00.45	Austin, United States	9 April 2011
African record	Nigeria (Clement Chukwu, Jude Monye, Sunday Bada, Enefiok Udo-Obong)	2:58.68	Sydney, Australia	30 September 2000
Asian record	Japan (Shunji Karube, Koji Ito, Jun Osakada, Shigekazu Omori)	3:00.76	Atlanta, United States	3 August 1996
North, Central American and Caribbean record	United States (Andrew Valmon, Quincy Watts, Harry Reynolds, Michael Johnson)	2:54.29	Stuttgart, Germany	22 August 1993
South American record	Brazil (Eronilde de Araújo, Cleverson da Silva, Claudinei da Silva, Sanderlei Parrela)	2:58.56	Winnipeg, Canada	30 July 1999
European record	Great Britain (Iwan Thomas, Jamie Baulch, Mark Richardson, Roger Black)	2:56.60	Atlanta, United States	3 August 1996
Oceanian record	Australia (Bruce Frayne, Gary Minihan, Richard Mitchell, Darren Clark)	2:59.70	Los Angeles, United States	11 August 1984

== Qualification standards ==
A time	B time
3:04.00

== Schedule ==
Date	Time	Round
1 September 2011	12:30	Heats
2 September 2011	21:15	Final

== Results ==
KEY:	q	Fastest non-qualifiers	Q	Qualified	NR	National record	PB	Personal best	SB	Seasonal best

=== Heats ===
Qualification: First 3 of each heat (Q) plus the 2 fastest times (q) advance to the final.

Rank	Heat	Nation	Athletes	Time	Notes
1	1	United States	Greg Nixon, Jamaal Torrance, Michael Berry, LaShawn Merritt	2:58.82	Q, WL
2	1	Jamaica	Allodin Fothergill, Riker Hylton, Lansford Spence, Leford Green	2:59.13	Q, SB
3	1	South Africa	Oscar Pistorius, Ofentse Mogawane, Willem de Beer, Shane Victor	2:59.21	Q, NR
4	1	Great Britain & N.I.	Richard Strachan, Nigel Levine, Christopher Clarke, Martyn Rooney	3:00.38	q
5	1	Germany	Jonas Plass, Kamghe Gaba, Eric Krüger, Thomas Schneider	3:00.68	q
6	2	Belgium	Antoine Gillet, Jonathan Borlée, Nils Duerinck, Kévin Borlée	3:00.71	Q, SB
7	2	Russia	Maksim Dyldin, Konstantin Svechkar, Pavel Trenikhin, Denis Alekseyev	3:00.81	Q, SB
8	2	Kenya	Vincent Kiplangat Kosgei, Anderson Mureta Mutegi, Vincent Mumo Kiilu, Mark Mutai	3:00.97	Q, SB
9	2	Bahamas	Ramon Miller, Avard Moncur, Andrae Williams, LaToy Williams	3:01.54	
10	2	Australia	Ben Offereins, Tristan Thomas, Steven Solomon, Sean Wroe	3:01.56	SB
11	2	Poland	Kacper Kozłowski, Piotr Wiaderek, Jakub Krzewina, Marcin Marciniszyn	3:01.84	SB
12	1	Trinidad and Tobago	Zwede Hewitt, Jarrin Solomon, Deon Lendore, Renny Quow	3:02.47	
13	1	Japan	Kei Takase, Yuzo Kanemaru, Yusuke Ishitsuka, Hideyuki Hirose	3:02.64	SB
14	2	France	Nicolas Fillon, Teddy Venel, Mamoudou Hanne, Yoann Décimus	3:03.68	
15	1	South Korea	Park Bong-Go, Lim Chan-Ho, Lee Jun, Seong Hyeok-Je	3:04.05	NR
16	2	Saudi Arabia	Ismail Al-Sabani, Yousef Ahmed Masrahi, Hamed Al-Bishi, Mohammed Al-Salhi	3:05.65	SB

=== Final ===
Rank	Lane	Nation	Athletes	Time	Notes
1st place, gold medalist(s)	5	United States	Greg Nixon, Bershawn Jackson, Angelo Taylor, LaShawn Merritt	2:59.31	
2nd place, silver medalist(s)	8	South Africa	Shane Victor, Ofentse Mogawane, Willem de Beer, L. J. van Zyl	2:59.87	
3rd place, bronze medalist(s)	4	Jamaica	Allodin Fothergill, Jermaine Gonzales, Riker Hylton, Leford Green	3:00.10	
4	3	Russia	Maksim Dyldin, Konstantin Svechkar, Pavel Trenikhin, Denis Alekseyev	3:00.22	SB
5	6	Belgium	Jonathan Borlée, Antoine Gillet, Nils Duerinck, Kévin Borlée	3:00.41	SB
6	7	Kenya	Vincent Kiplangat Kosgei, Vincent Mumo Kiilu, Anderson Mureta Mutegi, Mark Mutai	3:01.15	
7	1	Great Britain & N.I.	Richard Strachan, Nigel Levine, Christopher Clarke, Martyn Rooney	3:01.16	
8	2	Germany	Jonas Plass, Kamghe Gaba, Miguel Rigau, Thomas Schneider	3:01.37	
