= Dmitry Buryak =

Russian sprinter (born 1987)

Dmitry Vasilyevich Buryak (Russian: Дмитрий Васильевич Буряк; born 5 June 1987) is a Russian sprint athlete.

== Achievements ==
Year	Competition	Venue	Position	Event	Notes
Representing Russia
2006	World Junior Championships	Beijing, China	18th (sf)	400m	47.24
2006	World Junior Championships	Beijing, China	2nd	4 × 400 m relay	3:05.13
2007	Universiade	Bangkok, Thailand	3rd	400 m	46.22
2007	Universiade	Bangkok, Thailand	3rd	4 × 400 m relay	3:05.04
2010	World Indoor Championships	Doha, Qatar	8th (sf)	400 m	46.95
2010	World Indoor Championships	Doha, Qatar	8th (h)	4 × 400 m relay	3:09.86
2011	European Indoor Championships	Paris, France	4th	400 m	46.70
2011	European Indoor Championships	Paris, France	4th	4 × 400 m relay	3:06.99
2011	Universiade	Shenzhen, China	14th (sf)	400 m	46.84
2011	Universiade	Shenzhen, China	1st	4 × 400 m relay	3:04.51
