= Hiroyuki Nakano (athlete) =

Japanese sprinter

Personal information
- Born: 9 December 1988 (age 37) Anjō, Japan
- Education: Aichi University of Education
- Height: 1.73 m (5 ft 8 in)
- Weight: 68 kg (150 lb)

Sport
- Country: Japan
- Sport: Track and field
- Event: 400 metres

Achievements and titles
- Personal best: 45.62 (Fukuroi 2013)
Medal record
Men's athletics
Representing Japan
World University Games
Silver medal – second place	2011 Shenzhen	4×400 m relay

Hiroyuki Nakano (中野 弘幸, Nakano Hiroyuki; born 9 December 1988 in Anjō) is a Japanese sprinter. He competed in the 4 × 400 m relay event at the 2012 Summer Olympics.

== Personal best ==
Event	Time (s)	Competition	Venue	Date	Notes
400 m	45.62	Shizuoka International Meet	Fukuroi, Japan	3 May 2013	

== International competition ==
Year	Competition	Venue	Position	Event	Time	Notes
Representing Japan
2011	World University Games	Shenzhen, China	12th (sf)	400 m	46.61	
2011	World University Games	Shenzhen, China	2nd	4×400 m relay	3:05.16 (relay leg: 1st)	
2012	Olympic Games	London, United Kingdom	11th (h)	4×400 m relay	3:03.86 (relay leg: 4th)	
2013	World Championships	Moscow, Russia	9th (h)	4×400 m relay	3:02.43 (relay leg: 4th)	SB
