= Sean Wroe =

Australian sprinter

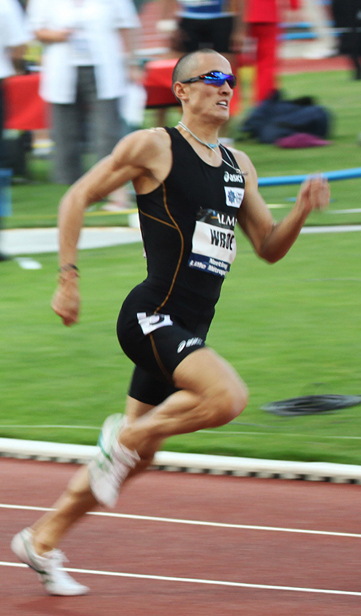
- Wroe in 2009

Personal information
- Nationality: Australia
- Born: 18 March 1985 (age 41) Melbourne, Victoria
- Height: 185 cm (6 ft 1 in)
- Weight: 90 kg (198 lb)

Sport
- Sport: Athletics
- Event: 400 m
- Club: Glenhuntly Athletics Club

Achievements and titles
- Personal best: 45.07 (2009)
Medal record
Representing Australia
Oceania Championships
Gold medal – first place	2010 Cairns	400 m
- Updated on 23 April 2013

Sean Wroe (born 19 March 1985) is an Australian sprinter. He was born in Melbourne to a Japanese Australian mother and is a fluent Japanese speaker.

Wroe competed at the 2008 Summer Olympics in the 400 m and 4 × 400 m relay. He placed 21st in the 400 m semifinal with a time of 45.56 seconds. His team placed sixth in the relay with a time of 3:00.02.

He was part of the team that won the 4 × 400 m relay at the 2006 Commonwealth Games in Melbourne. He anchored the team as they successfully defended their title at the 2010 Commonwealth Games in Delhi. He won silver in the individual event in Delhi.

== Major competitions record ==
Year	Competition	Venue	Position	Event	Notes
Representing Australia
2004	World Junior Championships	Grosseto, Italy	6th	400m	46.84
2004	World Junior Championships	Grosseto, Italy	7th	4 × 400 m relay	3:07.95
2006	Commonwealth Games	Melbourne, Australia	21st (sf)	400 m	46.47
2006	Commonwealth Games	Melbourne, Australia	1st (h)	4 × 400 m relay	3:03.04
2007	Universiade	Bangkok, Thailand	1st	400 m	45.49
2007	Universiade	Bangkok, Thailand	2nd	4 × 400 m relay	3:02.76
2007	World Championships	Osaka, Japan	14th (sf)	400 m	45.25
2007	World Championships	Osaka, Japan	9th (h)	4 × 400 m relay	3:02.59
2008	World Indoor Championships	Valencia, Spain	6th	400 m	46.93
2008	Olympic Games	Beijing, China	21st (sf)	400 m	45.56
2008	Olympic Games	Beijing, China	6th	4 × 400 m relay	3:02.76
2009	Universiade	Belgrade, Serbia	15th (sf)	100 m	10.59
2009	Universiade	Belgrade, Serbia	16th (sf)	200 m	21.37
2009	Universiade	Belgrade, Serbia	1st	4 × 400 m relay	3:03.67
2009	World Championships	Berlin, Germany	13th (sf)	400 m	45.32
2009	World Championships	Berlin, Germany	3rd	4 × 400 m relay	3:00.90
2010	Oceania Championships	Cairns, Australia	1st	400 m	46.62 (CR)
2010	Commonwealth Games	Delhi, India	2nd	400 m	45.46
2010	Commonwealth Games	Delhi, India	1st	4 × 400 m relay	3:03.30
2011	Universiade	Shenzhen, China	3rd	400 m	45.93
2011	World Championships	Daegu, South Korea	10th (h)	4 × 400 m relay	3:01.56
