= Yevgeniy Lebedev =

Russian sprinter

Yevgeniy Lebedev (born 19 February 1981) is a Russian sprinter who specializes in the 400 metres.

Lebedev won the bronze medal in 4 × 400 metres relay at the 2006 World Indoor Championships, together with teammates Konstantin Svechkar, Aleksandr Derevyagin and Dmitriy Petrov. Previously Lebedev had finished seventh in the same event at the 2005 World Championships.
