= Piotr Kędzia =

Polish sprinter (born 1984)

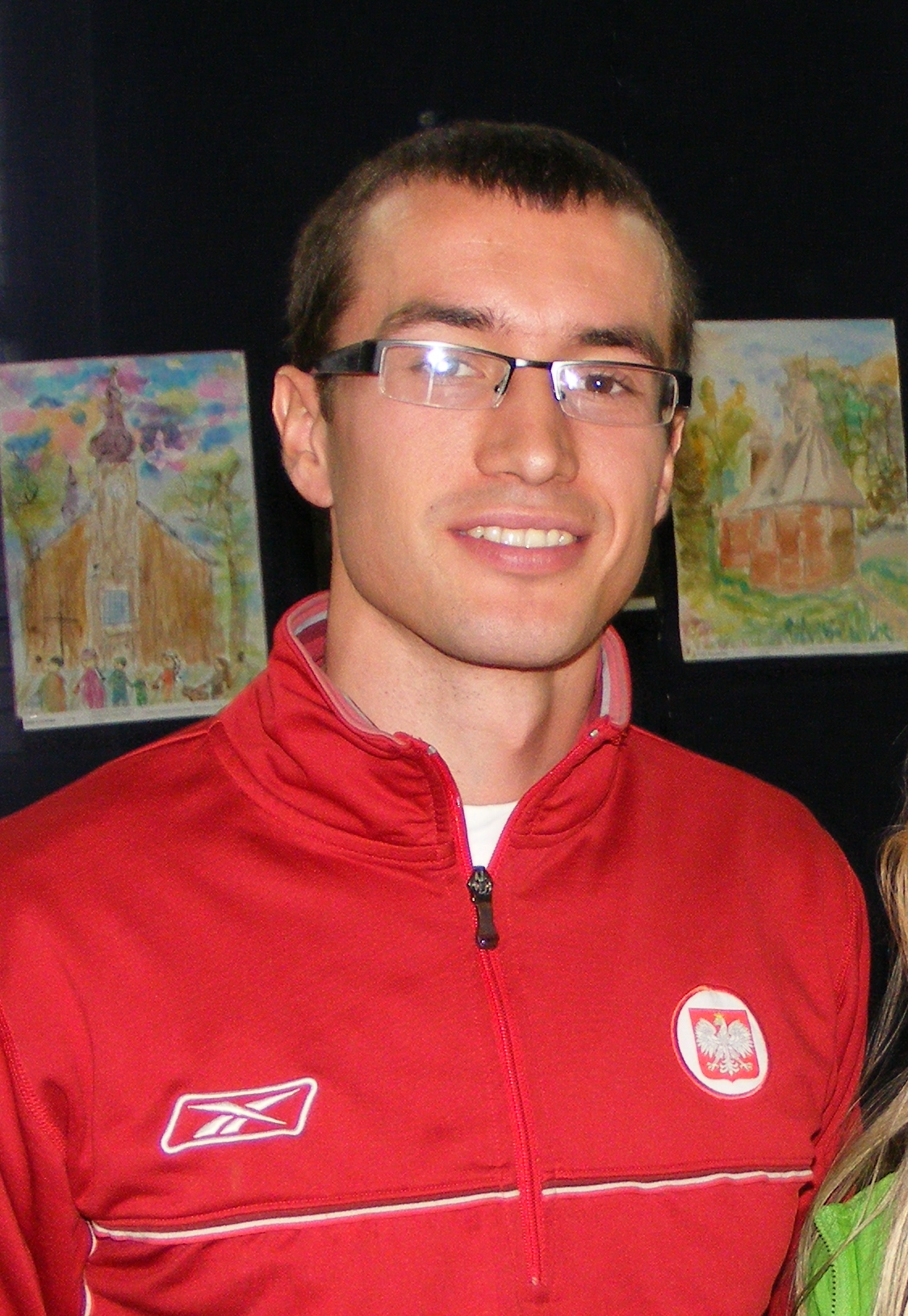
- Kędzia in 2010

Personal information
- Nationality: Polish
- Born: 6 June 1986 (age 40) Zgierz, Poland

Sport
- Sport: sprinting
Medal record
Men's athletics
Representing Poland
World Indoor Championships
Silver medal – second place	2006 Moscow	4 × 400m relay
European Championships
Bronze medal – third place	2006 Gothenburg	4 x 400 m relay
European Indoor Championships
Bronze medal – third place	2007 Birmingham	4 x 400 m relay

Piotr Kędzia (born 6 June 1984) is a Polish former sprinter who specialised in the 400 metres. He represented his country in the 4 × 400 metres relay at the 2008 Summer Olympics finishing sixth in the final.

== Competition record ==
Year	Competition	Venue	Position	Event	Notes
Representing Poland
2001	World Youth Championships	Debrecen, Hungary	2nd	400 m	47.12
2001	World Youth Championships	Debrecen, Hungary	1st	Medley relay	1:50.46
2001	European Junior Championships	Grosseto, Italy	1st	4 × 400 m relay	3:06.12
2002	World Junior Championships	Kingston, Jamaica	4th	4 × 400 m relay	3:06.25
2003	European Junior Championships	Tampere, Finland	3rd	400 m	46.69
2003	European Junior Championships	Tampere, Finland	2nd	4 × 400 m relay	3:08.62
2005	European U23 Championships	Erfurt, Germany	11th (sf)	400 m	46.62
2005	European U23 Championships	Erfurt, Germany	1st	4 × 400 m relay	3:04.41
2005	Universiade	İzmir, Turkey	7th	400 m	46.89
2005	Universiade	İzmir, Turkey	1st	4 × 400 m relay	3:02.57
2006	World Indoor Championships	Moscow, Russia	2nd (h)	4 × 400 m relay	3:06.10
2006	European Championships	Gothenburg, Sweden	3rd	4 × 400 m relay	3:01.73
2007	European Indoor Championships	Birmingham, United Kingdom	3rd	4 × 400 m relay	3:08.14
2007	Universiade	Bangkok, Thailand	7th	400 m	46.85
2007	Universiade	Bangkok, Thailand	1st	4 × 400 m relay	3:02.05
2008	World Indoor Championships	Valencia, Spain	4th	4 × 400 m relay	3:08.76
2008	Olympic Games	Beijing, China	6th	4 × 400 m relay	3:00.32
2009	Universiade	Belgrade, Serbia	2nd	4 × 400 m relay	3:05.69
