= Piotr Klimczak =

Polish sprinter (born 1980)

Personal information
- Nationality: Polish
- Born: 18 January 1980 (age 46) Nowy Sącz, Poland

Sport
- Sport: Athletics
- Event: sprinting
- Club: AZS-AWF Kraków
Medal record
Men's athletics
Representing Poland
World Indoor Championships
| Silver medal – second place | 2006 Moscow | 4 × 400m relay |
European Indoor Championships
| Bronze medal – third place | 2007 Birmingham | 4 x 400 m relay |
| Bronze medal – third place | 2009 Turin | 4 x 400 m relay |

Piotr Klimczak (born 18 January 1980, in Nowy Sącz) is a Polish former sprinter who specialized in the 400 metres. He represented his country in the 4 × 400 metres relay at two consecutive Summer Olympics, starting in 2004. His biggest success in the relay is the silver medal at the 2006 World Indoor Championships and individually the silver at the 2007 Summer Universiade.

He played football before switching to athletics in 2002. He retired in 2013.

== Achievements ==
| Year | Competition | Venue | Position | Event | Notes |
Representing Poland
| 2004 | World Indoor Championships | Budapest, Hungary | 10th (h) | 4 × 400 m relay | 3:10.33 |
| 2004 | Olympic Games | Athens, Greece | 35th (h) | 400 m | 46.23 |
| 2004 | Olympic Games | Athens, Greece | 10th (h) | 4 × 400 m relay | 3:03.69 |
| 2005 | European Indoor Championships | Madrid, Spain | – | 4 × 400 m relay | DQ |
| 2005 | World Championships | Helsinki, Finland | 5th | 4 × 400 m relay | 3:00.58 |
| 2005 | Universiade | İzmir, Turkey | 1st | 4 × 400 m relay | 3:02.57 |
| 2006 | World Indoor Championships | Moscow, Russia | 2nd | 4 × 400 m relay | 3:04.67 |
| 2007 | European Indoor Championships | Birmingham, England | 3rd | 4 × 400 m relay | 3:08.14 |
| 2007 | Universiade | Bangkok, Thailand | 2nd | 400 m | 46.06 |
| 2007 | Universiade | Bangkok, Thailand | 1st | 4 × 400 m relay | 3:02.05 |
| 2008 | World Indoor Championships | Valencia, Spain | 4th | 4 × 400 m relay | 3:08.76 |
| 2008 | Olympic Games | Beijing, China | 7th | 4 × 400 m relay | 2:59.32 |
| 2009 | European Indoor Championships | Turin, Italy | 11th (sf) | 400 m | 53.81 |
| 2009 | European Indoor Championships | Turin, Italy | 3rd | 4 × 400 m relay | 3:07.04 |
| 2009 | World Championships | Berlin, Germany | 5th | 4 × 400 m relay | 3:02.23 |
| 2010 | World Indoor Championships | Doha, Qatar | 9th (h) | 4 × 400 m relay | 3:09.86 |
| 2010 | European Championships | Barcelona, Spain | 21st (sf) | 400 m | 46.68 |
| 2010 | European Championships | Barcelona, Spain | 5th | 4 × 400 m relay | 3:03.42 |

=== Personal bests ===
- 200 metres - 21.06 s (2006)
- 400 metres - 45.60 s (2005)
