= Paweł Ptak =

Polish sprinter

Personal information
- Born: 28 January 1983 (age 43) Leszno, Poland
Medal record
Men's athletics
Representing Poland
World Indoor Championships
Silver medal – second place	2006 Moscow	4 x 400 m

Paweł Ptak (born 28 January 1983) is a Polish sprinter. He won a silver medal in the 4 × 400 m relay at the 2006 IAAF World Indoor Championships, although he only participated in the heats. His team won third place in the 4 × 100 m relay at the 2001 European Athletics Junior Championships.
