= Athletics at the 2011 Summer Universiade =

- Dates: 16 August – 21 August
- Host city: Shenzhen, China
- Venue: New Shenzhen Stadium
- Level: Senior
- Events: 46
- Participation: 1115 athletes from 123 nations

The athletics competition at the 2011 Summer Universiade was held at the New Shenzhen Stadium in Shenzhen, China from August 16 to August 21, 2011.

== Medal summary ==
=== Men's events ===
Event	Gold		Silver		Bronze	
100 metres	Jacques Harvey; Jamaica	10.14	Rytis Sakalauskas; Lithuania	10.14; NR	Su Bingtian; China	10.27
200 metres	Rasheed Dwyer; Jamaica	20.20; PB	Thuso Mpuang; South Africa	20.59	Not awarded	
200 metres	Rasheed Dwyer; Jamaica	20.20; PB	Jason Young; Jamaica	20.59	Not awarded	
400 metres	Marcell Deák-Nagy; Hungary	45.50	Peter Matthews; Jamaica	45.62; PB	Sean Wroe; Australia	45.93; SB
800 metres	Lachlan Renshaw; Australia	1:46.36	Teng Haining; China	1:46.62; PB	Fred Samoei; Kenya	1:46.72
1500 metres	Imad Touil; Algeria	3:48.13	Abdelmadjed Touil; Algeria	3:48.24	Valentin Smirnov; Russia	3:48.45
5000 metres	Andrew Vernon; Great Britain	14:00.06	Evgeny Rybakov; Russia	14:00.60	Stefano La Rosa; Italy	14:02.95
10,000 metres	Suguru Osako; Japan	28:42.83; SB	Stephen Mokoka; South Africa	28:53.09	Ahmed Tamri; Morocco	29:06.20
Half marathon	Ahmed Tamri; Morocco	1:06:20	Fatih Bilgic; Turkey	1:06:20	Tsubasa Hayakawa; Japan	1:06:25
Half marathon team	Japan (JPN); Tsubasa Hayakawa; Hiromitsu Kakuage; Takehiro Deki; Yo Yazawa	3:20:37	China (CHN); Bian Qi; Zheng Guojun; Yan Jun; Gao Laiyuan; Yang Le	3:37:25		
110 metres hurdles	Hansle Parchment; Jamaica	13.24 PB	Jiang Fan; China	13.55	Ronald Brookins; United States	13.56
400 metres hurdles	Jeshua Anderson; United States	49.03	Takayuki Kishimoto; Japan	49.52	Kurt Couto; Mozambique	49.61
3000 metres steeplechase	Alberto Paulo; Portugal	8:32.26	Halil Akkaş; Turkey	8:34.57 SB	Ildar Minshin; Russia	8:34.86
20 kilometres walk	Andrey Krivov; Russia	1:24:26	Andrés Chocho; Ecuador	1:24:44	Moacir Zimmermann; Brazil	1:25:06
20 kilometres walk team	Russia (RUS); Andrey Krivov; Mikhail Ryzhov; Andrey Ruzavin	4:19:19	China (CHN); Cai Zelin; Yu Wei; Niu Wenbin; Yang Tao	4:24:56		
4x100 metres relay	South Africa (RSA); Hannes Dreyer; Simon Magakwe; Rapula Sefanyetso; Thuso Mpuang	39.25	China (CHN); Yang Yang; Huang Minhua; Chang Pengben; Zheng Dongsheng	39.39	Hong Kong (HKG); Yip Siukeung; Lai Chun Ho; Leung Kiho; Ho Manloklawrence	39.44
4x400 metres relay	Russia (RUS); Aleksandr Sigalovskiy; Dmitry Buryak; Artem Vazhov; Valentin Kruglyakov	3:04.51	Japan (JPN); Hiroyuki Nakano; Shintaro Horie; Hideyuki Hirose; Takatoshi Abe	3:05.16	South Africa (RSA); Shane Victor; André Olivier; Pieter Beneke; Willem de Beer	3:05.61
High jump	Bogdan Bondarenko; Ukraine	2.28	Wojciech Theiner; Poland	2.26; SB	Sergey Mudrov; Russia	2.24
Pole vault	Łukasz Michalski; Poland	5.75; SB	Mateusz Didenkow; Poland; Aleksandr Gripich; Russia	5.75; PB		
Long jump	Su Xiongfeng; China	8.17	Marquise Goodwin; United States	8.03	Julian Reid; Great Britain	7.96
Triple jump	Nelson Évora; Portugal	17.31; SB	Viktor Kuznyetsov; Ukraine	16.89	Yevgeniy Ektov; Kazakhstan	16.83
Shot put	O'Dayne Richards; Jamaica	19.93; PB	Soslan Tsyrikhov; Russia	19.80	Mason Finley; United States	19.72
Discus throw	Märt Israel; Estonia	64.07	Przemysław Czajkowski; Poland	63.62	Ronald Julião; Brazil	63.30; NR
Hammer throw	Paweł Fajdek; Poland	78.14	Marcel Lomnický; Slovakia	73.90	Lorenzo Povegliano; Italy	73.39
Javelin throw	Fatih Avan; Turkey	83.79	Roman Avramenko; Ukraine	81.42	Igor Janik; Poland	79.65
Decathlon	Vasiliy Kharlamov; Russia	8166	Gaël Querin; France	7857	Mikhail Logvinenko; Russia	7835

=== Women's events ===
Event	Gold		Silver		Bronze	
100 metres	Carrie Russell; Jamaica	11.05 =PB	Hrystyna Stuy; Ukraine	11.34 PB	Lina Grinčikaitė; Lithuania	11.44
200 metres	Anneisha McLaughlin; Jamaica	22.54 =PB	Tiffany Townsend; United States	22.96	Anna Kaygorodova; Russia	23.16 PB
400 metres	Olga Topilskaya; Russia	51.63	Yelena Migunova; Russia	51.77 SB	Diamond Dixon; United States	52.76
800 metres	Olha Zavhorodnya; Ukraine	1:59.56 PB	Elena Kofanova; Russia	1:59.94	Liliya Lobanova; Ukraine	2:00.42
1500 metres	Anna Mishchenko; Ukraine	4:05.91	Denise Krebs; Germany	4:07.70	Liu Fang; China	4:07.90
5000 metres	Binnaz Uslu; Turkey	15:41.15 PB	Sara Moreira; Portugal	15:45.83	Natalya Popkova; Russia	15:52.55
10,000 metres	Fadime Suna; Turkey	33:11.92	Hanae Tanaka; Japan	33:15.57	Mai Ishibashi; Japan	33:41.90
Half marathon	Ro Un-Ok; North Korea	1:16:38	Jin Lingling; China	1:16:42	Sayo Nomura; Japan	1:16:48
Half marathon team	Japan (JPN); Sayo Nomura; Machiko Iwakawa; Aki Otagiri; Shiho Takechi	3:50:43	China (CHN); Jin Lingling; Jiang Xiaoli; Li Zhenzhu; Jin Yuan; Sun Juan	3:53:09		
100 metres hurdles	Nia Sifaatihii Ali; United States	12.85	Natalya Ivoninskaya; Kazakhstan	13.16	Christina Manning; United States	13.17
400 metres hurdles	Hanna Yaroshchuk; Ukraine	55.15	Irina Davydova; Russia	55.50	Nagihan Karadere; Turkey	55.81
3000 metres steeplechase	Binnaz Uslu; Turkey	9:33.50 PB	Lyudmila Kuzmina; Russia	9:44.77	Jin Yuan; China	9:45.21 SB
20 kilometres walk	Júlia Takács; Spain	1:33:51	Tatiana Shemyakina; Russia	1:34:23	Nina Okhotnikova; Russia	1:35:10
20 kilometres walk team	China (CHN); Shi Yang; Yang Yawei; Wang Shanshan	4:58:57				
4x100 metres relay	Ukraine (UKR); Hanna Titimets; Nataliya Pohrebnyak; Hrystyna Stuy; Yelizaveta Bryzhina	43.33	United States (USA); Lakya Brookins; Shayla Mahan; Christina Manning; Tiffany Townsend	43.48	Jamaica (JAM); Shermaine Williams; Carrie Russell; Anneisha McLaughlin; Anastasia Le-Roy	43.57
4x400 metres relay	Russia (RUS); Marina Karnaushchenko; Yelena Migunova; Kseniya Ustalova; Olga Topilskaya	3:27.16	Turkey (TUR); Nagihan Karadere; Merve Aydın; Meliz Redif; Pınar Saka	3:30.14	Great Britain (GBR); Kelly Lorraine Massey; Charlotte Anne Best; Meghan Beesley; Emily Diamond	3:33.09
High jump	Brigetta Barrett; United States	1.96 PB	Airinė Palšytė; Lithuania	1.96 =NR	Anna Iljuštšenko; Estonia	1.94
Pole vault	Aleksandra Kiryashova; Russia	4.65 =PB	Tina Šutej; Slovenia	4.55	Ekaterini Stefanidi; Greece	4.45 =PB
Long jump	Anna Nazarova; Russia	6.72	Yuliya Pidluzhnaya; Russia	6.56	Melanie Bauschke; Germany	6.51
Triple jump	Ekaterina Koneva; Russia	14.25 PB	Patrícia Mamona; Portugal	14.23	Cristina Bujin; Romania	14.21
Shot put	Irina Tarasova; Russia	18.02	Sophie Kleeberg; Germany	17.48	Meng Qianqian; China	17.21
Discus throw	Żaneta Glanc; Poland	63.99 PB	Zinaida Sendriūtė; Lithuania	62.49 PB	Svetlana Saykina; Russia	60.81
Hammer throw	Zalina Marghieva; Moldova	72.93 NR	Éva Orbán; Hungary	71.33 NR	Bianca Perie; Romania	71.18
Javelin throw	Sunette Viljoen; South Africa	66.47 AR	Marina Maximova; Russia	59.87	Justine Robbeson; South Africa	59.78
Heptathlon	Olga Kurban; Russia	6151	Viktorija Žemaitytė; Lithuania	5958	Kateřina Cachová; Czech Republic	5873

=== Medal table ===
Rank	Nation	Gold	Silver	Bronze	Total
1	Russia (RUS)	11	10	8	29
2	Jamaica (JAM)	6	2	1	9
3	Ukraine (UKR)	5	3	1	9
4	Turkey (TUR)	4	3	1	8
5	United States (USA)	3	3	4	10
6	Japan (JPN)	3	3	3	9
7	Poland (POL)	3	3	1	7
8	China (CHN)	2	7	4	13
9	South Africa (RSA)	2	2	2	6
10	Portugal (POR)	2	2	0	4
11	Algeria (ALG)	1	1	0	2
11	Hungary (HUN)	1	1	0	2
13	Great Britain (GBR)	1	0	2	3
14	Australia (AUS)	1	0	1	2
14	Estonia (EST)	1	0	1	2
14	Morocco (MAR)	1	0	1	2
17	Moldova (MDA)	1	0	0	1
17	North Korea (PRK)	1	0	0	1
17	Spain (ESP)	1	0	0	1
20	Lithuania (LTU)	0	4	1	5
21	Germany (GER)	0	2	1	3
22	Kazakhstan (KAZ)	0	1	1	2
23	Ecuador (ECU)	0	1	0	1
23	France (FRA)	0	1	0	1
23	Slovakia (SVK)	0	1	0	1
23	Slovenia (SLO)	0	1	0	1
27	Brazil (BRA)	0	0	2	2
27	Italy (ITA)	0	0	2	2
27	Romania (ROU)	0	0	2	2
30	Czech Republic (CZE)	0	0	1	1
30	Greece (GRE)	0	0	1	1
30	Hong Kong (HKG)	0	0	1	1
30	Kenya (KEN)	0	0	1	1
30	Mozambique (MOZ)	0	0	1	1
Totals (34 entries)		50	51	44	145

== Participating nations ==
- Albania (9)
- Algeria (9)
- Anguilla (2)
- Australia (17)
- Austria (2)
- Azerbaijan (1)
- Bangladesh (2)
- Barbados (2)
- Belarus (11)
- Belgium (11)
- Benin (1)
- Bolivia (2)
- Bosnia and Herzegovina (2)
- Botswana (12)
- Brazil (16)
- Bulgaria (3)
- Burkina Faso (2)
- Burundi (2)
- Cameroon (2)
- Canada (34)
- Chad (2)
- Chile (6)
- China (69)
- Chinese Taipei (3)
- Colombia (2)
- Comoros (1)
- Costa Rica (2)
- Ivory Coast (2)
- Croatia (5)
- Cyprus (6)
- Czech Republic (11)
- Democratic Republic of the Congo (1)
- Denmark (11)
- Dominican Republic (1)
- Ecuador (4)
- Egypt (3)
- Estonia (30)
- Ethiopia (2)
- Federated States of Micronesia (1)
- Fiji (5)
- Finland (16)
- France (12)
- Georgia (1)
- Germany (18)
- Ghana (16)
- Great Britain (24)
- Greece (3)
- Guatemala (1)
- Honduras (4)
- Hong Kong (10)
- Hungary (9)
- India (7)
- Indonesia (6)
- Iran (9)
- Iraq (1)
- Ireland (8)
- Israel (2)
- Italy (22)
- Jamaica (12)
- Japan (32)
- Kazakhstan (13)
- Kenya (13)
- Latvia (17)
- Lebanon (9)
- Lesotho (2)
- Lithuania (26)
- Luxembourg (1)
- Macau (10)
- Malawi (1)
- Malaysia (20)
- Mexico (7)
- Moldova (3)
- Montenegro (1)
- Morocco (7)
- Mozambique (2)
- Namibia (6)
- Netherlands (2)
- Netherlands Antilles (5)
- New Zealand (9)
- Nicaragua (1)
- Nigeria (7)
- North Korea (3)
- Norway (13)
- Oman (9)
- Pakistan (1)
- Panama (3)
- Paraguay (4)
- Peru (4)
- Philippines (3)
- Poland (26)
- Portugal (12)
- Republic of the Congo (4)
- Romania (12)
- Russia (74)
- Samoa (2)
- Saudi Arabia (16)
- Senegal (6)
- Serbia (2)
- Singapore (6)
- Slovakia (4)
- Slovenia (14)
- South Africa (35)
- South Korea (16)
- Spain (16)
- Sri Lanka (10)
- Suriname (2)
- Swaziland (2)
- Sweden (7)
- Switzerland (14)
- Tajikistan (2)
- Tanzania (1)
- Thailand (18)
- Togo (1)
- Turkey (19)
- Uganda (8)
- Ukraine (22)
- United Arab Emirates (3)
- United States (19)
- Uzbekistan (1)
- United States Virgin Islands (6)
- Vietnam (2)
- Zambia (4)
- Zimbabwe (5)

== See also ==
- 2011 in the sport of athletics
- FISU World University Games
- University and college sport
