= Manteo Mitchell =

American sprinter

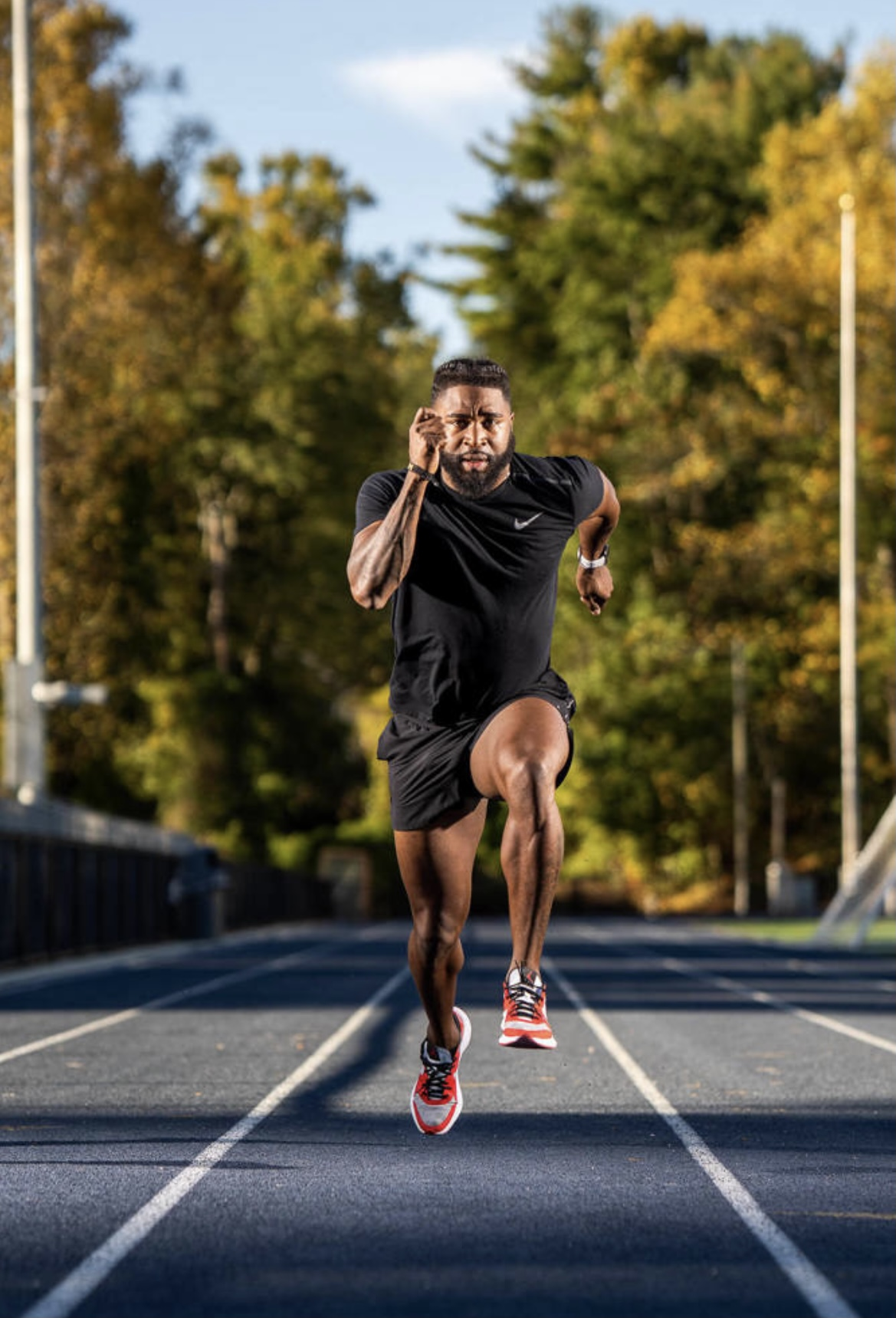

Personal information
- National team: United States of America
- Born: July 6, 1987 (age 39) Shelby, North Carolina, U.S.
- Height: 1.89 m (6 ft 2 1/2 in)
- Weight: 100 kg (220 lb)

Sport
- Country: United States
- Sport: Athletics, Bobsled
- Events: 200 m, 400 m, 4 × 400 m Relay, Brakeman
- Turned pro: 2012
- Coached by: Danny Williamson (2005-present), David Pickett (2012-present)

Achievements and titles
- Olympic finals: 1
- World finals: 6
- National finals: 15
Medal record
Men's athletics
Representing the United States
Olympic Games
Silver medal – second place	2012 London	4 × 400 m relay
World Indoor Championships
Gold medal – first place	2012 Istanbul	4 × 400 m relay
US Indoor Championships
Gold medal – first place	2015 Boston	2015 USATF Indoor Championships – Men's 300 metres
Silver medal – second place	2019 New York	2019 USATF Indoor Championships – Men's 300 metres

Manteo Mitchell (born July 6, 1987) is an American sprinter and bobsledder. As a sprinter, he competed in the 200 m, 400 m, and 4 × 400 m relay. He was a member of the USA team that won the gold medal in the Men's 4 × 400 metres relay at the 2012 IAAF World Indoor Championships. Mitchell successfully ran in the 4 x 400 m relay qualifiers at the 2012 Olympic Games despite breaking his fibula during the race, and was later awarded a silver medal after the team's placement in the final. Mitchell began competing in bobsleigh in 2021.

== Early life ==
Mitchell was born on July 6, 1987 in Shelby, North Carolina. He attended Crest High School, being named all-conference, all-region, and all-state in his junior and senior years. He then enrolled at Western Carolina University on an athletic scholarship, setting school records in the 400 m, 4 × 100 m relay, and 4 × 400 m relay. Mitchell also led the Catamounts to indoor and outdoor championships, and was named MVP in his junior year.

== Professional career ==
=== Track ===
At the 2012 United States Olympic Trials, Mitchell qualified for the Olympic team by finishing fifth in the 400 metres with a time of 44.96, which qualified him to run in the 4 × 400 metres relay as a member of the U.S. relay team. At the 2012 Summer Olympics held in London, Mitchell ran the first leg of the heat for the 4 × 400 metres relay and revealed afterwards that he broke his left fibula at the 200 m mark. Despite this, Manteo finished his lap and clocked a time of 45.7, and the American team was able to qualify for the final.

Mitchell revealed that he had bruised his left leg in a fall at the athletes village a few days before. Mitchell later earned a silver medal after the American team placed second in the final. In September 2012, during a visit by Olympians and Paralympians to the White House, President Barack Obama called Mitchell's successful relay one of his favorite moments of the games.

After suffering an Achilles injury after a car accident in 2016, Mitchell did not qualify to an international competition after 2017.

=== Bobsleigh ===
In July 2020, Mitchell was persuaded to try bobsleigh by United States Bobsled and Skeleton Federation CEO Aron McGuire to try the sport.

He started doing bobsled runs later that year and started competitions in 2021. By late 2022, Mitchell qualified for the sport's premier international competition circuit, the Bobsleigh World Cup. Mitchell, as the push athlete, finished fifth alongside driver Frank Del Duca in the two-man event at the IBSF World Championships, which was the best American result since 2013.

== Personal life ==
Mitchell currently resides in Asheville, North Carolina. He has a son born in 2012 and a daughter born in 2022 or 2023. Shortly after the 2012 games, he got a tattoo of the Olympic rings, broken but still connected, at the spot where he broke his left fibula during the games. Later he got another set of Olympic rings tattooed on the same leg, without any.

== Personal bests ==
Event	Time (seconds)	Venue
200 meters (outdoor)	20.20	Charlotte, North Carolina, United States
200 meters (indoor)	20.89	Blacksburg, VirginiaUnited States
400 meters (outdoor)	44.96	Eugene, Oregon, United States
400 meters (indoor)	46.17	Albuquerque, New Mexico, United States

- 100 m: 10.04 s (wind: -0.1 m/s) – (United States) Cullowhee, North Carolina 2010
- 200 m: 20.20 s (wind: +1.7 m/s) – (United States) Eugene, Oregon 2012
- 400 m: 44.96 s – (United States) Eugene, Oregon, 2012
