= Marvin Essor =

Jamaican sprinter (born 1981)

Marvin Essor (born 27 August 1981) is a retired Jamaican sprinter who specialised in the 400 metres. He won the gold medal at the 2005 Summer Universiade.

His personal best is 45.49 in 2005. Essor was also a representative for Jamaica at the 2008 Summer Olympic in Beijing, on the 4 × 400 m team. A successful NCAA college athlete, Essor was a 7-time All-American and 4-Time National Champion while attending Abilene Christian University in Abilene, Texas. He was the 2005 NCAA Division II Indoor and Outdoor 400 m Champion.

== Competition record ==
Year	Competition	Venue	Position	Event	Notes
Representing Jamaica
2003	Central American and Caribbean Championships	St. George's, Grenada	2nd	4 × 100 m	39.20
2003	Central American and Caribbean Championships	St. George's, Grenada	2nd	4 × 400 m	3:04.08
2003	Universiade	Daegu, South Korea	8th	400 m	48.01
2005	Central American and Caribbean Championships	Nassau, Bahamas	4th	4 × 400 m	3:03.51
2005	Universiade	İzmir, Turkey	1st	400 m	45.99
2005	Universiade	İzmir, Turkey	4th	4 × 400 m	3:03.93
2009	Central American and Caribbean Championships	Havana, Cuba	3rd	4 × 400 m	3:04.09
