= Yoshihiro Azuma =

Japanese sprinter

Yoshihiro Azuma (東 佳弘, Azuma Yoshihiro; born 7 May 1991 in Takamatsu) is a Japanese sprinter. He competed in the 4 × 400 m relay event at the 2012 Summer Olympics.
