= 2005 Asian Athletics Championships – Men's 400 metres =

The men's 400 metres event at the 2005 Asian Athletics Championships was held in Incheon, South Korea on September 1–3.

== Medalists ==
Gold	Silver	Bronze
Yuzo Kanemaru; Japan	Prasanna Amarasekara; Sri Lanka	Rohan Pradeep Kumara; Sri Lanka

== Results ==
=== Heats ===
Rank	Heat	Name	Nationality	Time	Notes
1	2	Rohan Pradeep Kumara	Sri Lanka	46.46	Q
2	1	Yuki Yamaguchi	Japan	46.56	Q
3	2	Hamdan Al-Bishi	Saudi Arabia	46.59	Q
4	1	Prasanna Amarasekara	Sri Lanka	46.69	Q
5	2	Yuzo Kanemaru	Japan	46.86	Q
6	1	Cho Sung-Kwon	South Korea	47.10	Q, SB
7	1	Reza Bouazar	Iran	47.13	q, SB
7	2	Mohammad Akefian	Iran	47.13	q
9	1	Mohamed Salim Al-Rawahi	Oman	47.44	NJR
10	1	Fawzi Al-Shammari	Kuwait	47.83	
11	2	Jimar Aing	Philippines	48.06	
12	1	Boris Khamzin	Kazakhstan	48.18	
13	2	Muhd Firdaus Bin Juhari	Singapore	48.73	
14	1	Ernie Candelario	Philippines	49.00	
15	2	Choi Myong-Joon	South Korea	49.20	
16	2	Abdul Qadeer Ghani Zada	Afghanistan	53.68	PB

=== Final ===
Rank	Name	Nationality	Time	Notes
1st place, gold medalist(s)	Yuzo Kanemaru	Japan	46.04	
2nd place, silver medalist(s)	Prasanna Amarasekara	Sri Lanka	46.48	
3rd place, bronze medalist(s)	Rohan Pradeep Kumara	Sri Lanka	46.52	
4	Hamdan Al-Bishi	Saudi Arabia	46.55	
5	Yuki Yamaguchi	Japan	46.65	
6	Mohammad Akefian	Iran	46.93	
7	Reza Bouazar	Iran	47.58	
8	Cho Sung-Kwon	South Korea	47.81	
