= 2007 European Athletics Indoor Championships – Men's 4 × 400 metres relay =

The Men's 4 × 400 metres relay event at the 2007 European Athletics Indoor Championships was held on March 4. Germany were originally awarded the gold medal, however, on an appeal by the Russian team, were disqualified for pushing, meaning the gold medal went to Great Britain and NI.

== Results ==
Rank	Team	Athlete	Time	Notes
1st place, gold medalist(s)	Great Britain	Robert Tobin; Dale Garland; Philip Taylor; Steven Green	3:07.04	
2nd place, silver medalist(s)	Russia	Ivan Buzolin; Vladislav Frolov; Maksim Dyldin; Artem Sergeyenkov	3:08.10	
3rd place, bronze medalist(s)	Poland	Piotr Kędzia; Marcin Marciniszyn; Łukasz Pryga; Piotr Klimczak	3:08.14	
4	France	Yannick Fonsat; Richard Maunier; Yoan Décimus; Fadil Bellaabouss	3:10.15	
5	Romania	Vasile Bobos; Catalin Cîmpeanu; Bogdan Vîlcu; Ioan Vieru	3:10.75	NR
	Germany	Ingo Schultz; Florian Seitz; Simon Kirch; Bastian Swillims	DQ	
