= Riker Hylton =

Jamaican sprinter (born 1988)

Personal information
- Nationality: Jamaica
- Born: 13 December 1988 (age 37) Saint Catherine Parish, Jamaica
- Height: 1.80 m (5 ft 11 in)
- Weight: 61 kg (134 lb)

Sport
- Sport: Track and field
- Events: 400 metres, 4 x 400 m relay
- College team: LSU Tigers track and field

Achievements and titles
- Personal bests: 200 m 20.56 (+1.0 m/s) (Tempe 2012); 400 m 45.30 (Kingston 2011)
Medal record
Men's athletics
Representing Jamaica
World Championships
Bronze medal – third place	2011 Daegu	4×400 m relay

Riker Hylton (born 13 December 1988) is a Jamaican sprinter, competing in the 400 metres.

Riker Hylton won a bronze medal as part of the Jamaican team in the 4 × 400 metres relay at the 2011 World Championships in Athletics in Daegu. He also ran in the 400 metres, where he was eliminated in the semi-finals

Hylton did not make the individual 400m Jamaican team for the 2012 Summer Olympics, but did compete in the 4 × 400 metres relay, running the second leg in the heats before Jermaine Gonzales pulled up injured.

In 2017, he was charged with evading a doping test by the Jamaica Anti-Doping Commission ("JADCO"). He was cleared of any wrongdoing by Jamaica's Independent Anti-Doping Disciplinary Panel. The Panel was not "comfortably satisfied" that Hylton had been properly notified by JADCO. Hylton was represented by noted sports attorney Dr. Emir Crowne.
