= Mohammad Akefian =

Iranian sprinter

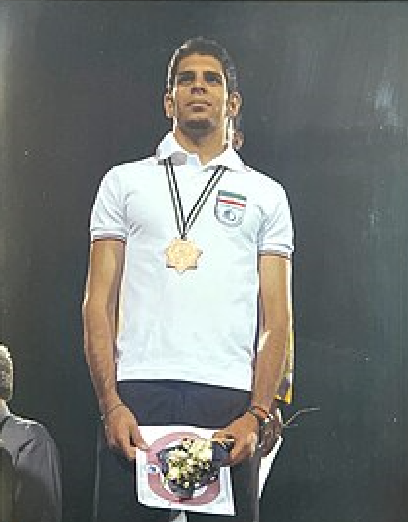
- Jordan asian championships 2007

Personal information
- Full name: Mohammad Akefian
- Nationality: Iran
- Born: 31 May 1984 (age 42) Isfahan, Iran
- Education: Master of Science in physical education from University of Tehran
- Height: 1.88 m (6 ft 2 in)
- Weight: 78 kg (172 lb)

Sport
- Country: Iran
- Sport: Athletics
- Event: 400 meters
Medal record
Men's athletics
Representing Iran
Asian Championships
Bronze medal – third place	2007 Amman	400 m
Asian Indoor Games
Gold medal – first place	2005 Pattaya	400 m
Silver medal – second place	2005 Pattaya	4×400 m
Asian Indoor Championships
Gold medal – first place	2004 Tehran	400 m
Gold medal – first place	2004 Tehran	4×400 m
Asian Junior Championships
Bronze medal – third place	2002 Bangkok	400 m
Bronze medal – third place	2002 Bangkok	4×400 m

Mohammad Akefian (born 31 May 1984) is an Iranian sprinter specializing in the 400 metres. He is the owner of 7 championship medals in Asian youth and adult athletics.Breaking Iran's 18-year-old record of 400 meters is his first honor in his sports career. From 2013 to 2023, Akafian is also in charge of the sprint coaching position of Iran's senior national team.

First place in the Hungarian international competition 2010, First place in the international competition of Kazakhstan 2012, First place in the international indoor competition in China 2009 and 8th place in the World Student Championship in Türkiye 2007 are among his other honors.

He also holds a coaching certificate for the advanced bodybuilding course from the National Olympic Committee and the level one track and field course from the World Athletics Federation.

== Competition record ==
Year	Competition	Venue	Position	Event	Notes
Representing Iran
2002	Asian Championships	Colombo, Sri Lanka	8th	400 m	47.97
2002	Asian Junior Championships	Bangkok, Thailand	4th	400 m	47.96
2002	Asian Junior Championships	Bangkok, Thailand	3rd	4 × 400 m relay	3:10.95
2002	Asian Junior Championships	Bangkok, Thailand	3rd	4 × 100 m relay	40.86
2003	Asian Championships	Manila, Philippines	10th (sf)	200 m	21.50
2003	Asian Championships	Manila, Philippines	10th (h)	400 m	47.12
2004	Asian Indoor Championships	Tehran, Iran	1st	400 m	48.71
2004	Asian Indoor Championships	Tehran, Iran	1st	4 × 400 m relay	3:16.99
2005	Universiade	İzmir, Turkey	8th	400 m	47.14
2005	Universiade	İzmir, Turkey	–	4 × 400 m relay	DNF
2005	Asian Championships	Incheon, South Korea	6th	400 m	46.93
2005	Asian Championships	Incheon, South Korea	4th	4 × 400 m relay	3:08.75
2005	Asian Indoor Games	Pattaya, Thailand	1st	400 m	47.83
2005	Asian Indoor Games	Pattaya, Thailand	2nd	4 × 400 m relay	3:18.81
2007	Asian Indoor Games	Macau	6th	400 m	49.06
2007	Asian Championships	Amman, Jordan	3rd	400 m	46.93
2007	Universiade	Bangkok, Thailand	16th (sf)	400 m	47.21
