= Kenya at the 2021 Summer World University Games =

- Flag of Kenya
- IOC code: KEN

in Chengdu, China 28 July 2023 – 8 August 2023
- Competitors: 3 (2 men and 1 woman)
- Medals: Gold 0 Silver 0 Bronze 0 Total 0

Summer World University Games appearances
- 1959; 1961; 1963; 1965; 1967; 1970; 1973; 1975; 1977; 1979; 1981; 1983; 1985; 1987; 1989; 1991; 1993; 1995; 1997; 1999; 2001; 2003; 2005; 2007; 2009; 2011; 2013; 2015; 2017; 2019; 2021; 2025; 2027

Kenya competed at the 2021 Summer World University Games in Chengdu, China held from 28 July to 8 August 2023.

== Competitors ==
Sport	Men	Women	Total
Athletics	1	1	2
Badminton	1	0	1

== Athletics ==
Men

Athlete	Event	Heat		Semi-finals		Final	
Athlete	Event	Result	Rank	Result	Rank	Result	Rank
Kelvin Kimtai Chepsigor	10,000 metres	—				29:36.99	4
Kelvin Kimtai Chepsigor	Half marathon	—				1:06:56	13

Women

Athlete	Event	Heat		Semi-finals		Final	
Athlete	Event	Result	Rank	Result	Rank	Result	Rank
Jane Ndihuri	100 metres	12.64 PB	40	Did not advance			
Jane Ndihuri	200 metres	Did not start					

== Badminton ==
Athlete	Event	Round of 64	Round of 32	Round of 16	Quarterfinal	Semifinal	Final / BM	
Athlete	Event	Opposition Score	Opposition Score	Opposition Score	Opposition Score	Opposition Score	Opposition Score	Rank
Derrick Odhiambo	Men's singles	Pui (MAC); L w/o	Did not advance					
