= Mozambique at the 2011 Summer Universiade =

- Flag of Mozambique
- IOC code: MOZ

in Shenzhen, China 12 August 2011 – 23 August 2011
- Competitors: 2 (1 man and 1 woman) in 1 sport and 2 events
- Medals: Gold 0 Silver 0 Bronze 1 Total 1

Summer Universiade appearances
- 1959; 1961; 1963; 1965; 1967; 1970; 1973; 1975; 1977; 1979; 1981; 1983; 1985; 1987; 1989; 1991; 1993; 1995; 1997; 1999; 2001; 2003; 2005; 2007; 2009; 2011; 2013; 2015; 2017; 2019; 2021

Mozambique competed at the 2011 Summer Universiade in Shenzhen, China held from 12 to 23 August 2011. In total athletes representing Mozambique won one bronze medal, in athletics.

Anatercia Quive competed in the women's 100 metres event and Kurt Couto competed in the men's 400 metres hurdles event.

== Medal summary ==
=== Medal by sports ===
Medals by sport
Athletics	0	0	1	1
Total	0	0	1	1

=== Medalists ===
Medal	Name	Sport	Event	Date
Bronze	Kurt Couto	Athletics	Men's 400 metres hurdles	August 19
