= O. J. Hogans =

American sprinter (born 1982)

Personal information
- Born: 29 June 1982 (age 44)
- Home town: Decatur, Georgia
- Education: Stephenson High School; Seton Hall University

Sport
- Country: United States
- Sport: Sport of athletics
- Event: 400 metres
- College team: Seton Hall Pirates
- Club: Holyfield International
- Coached by: John Moon

Achievements and titles
- National finals: 2003 NCAA Indoors; • 400 m, 2nd (silver); • 4 × 400 m, 6th; 2004 NCAA Indoors; • 400 m, 8th
- Personal bests: 200 m: 21.20 sh (2001); 400 m: 45.28 (2003)
Medal record
Men's athletics
Representing the United States
World Indoor Championships
Gold medal – first place	2006 Moscow	4 × 400 m relay
- Updated on November 2024

Obra J. Hogans (born 29 June 1982) is an American former sprinter specializing in the 400 metres and the 9th World Athletics Indoor Championships gold medallist in the 4 × 400 m relay. Before his professional career, Hogans was a multiple-time All American in the indoor 400 m for the Seton Hall Pirates.

== Career ==
After a prep career for the Stephenson High School Jaguars, Hogans signed with the Seton Hall Pirates track and field team. At the 2003 IC4A Indoor Championships, Hogan broke Howard Burnett's meeting record in the 400 m with a 45.86 second mark.

Hogan qualified for two NCAA Division I Men's Indoor Track and Field Championships timed finals in the 400 m. At the 2003 edition, he placed 2nd overall behind Gary Kikaya in 45.82 seconds, and finished 6th in the relay. The following year, Hogan placed 4th in the 'A' final and was 8th overall.

Following his 2003 indoor campaign success, Hogans was selected to represent the United States at the 2006 World Indoor Championships 4 × 400 m. Running second leg in the semi-finals, Hogan helped the U.S. team post the fastest qualifier, but him and James Davis were replaced by LaShawn Merritt and Milton Campbell in the finals. The United States won the gold medal ahead of Poland and Russia.

In May 2004, Hogans suffered a hamstring injury running a 4 × 100 m relay for Seton Hall. His coach John Moon offered him an "outside chance" of making the U.S. Olympic team and rested him from another race out of precaution.

Hogans competed at the 2004 United States Olympic trials. He advanced from his first round with a 46.36 clocking, but he did not ultimately qualify to represent the United States at the 2004 Summer Olympics.

Hogans won seven Big East Conference titles and was awarded the Most Outstanding Performer at the 2003 conference meet. In 2020, he was ranked as one of the greatest Seton Hall Pirates athletes of all time.

== Personal life ==
Hogans was born on 29 June 1982 and grew up in Decatur, Georgia. He attended Stephenson High School in Stone Mountain, DeKalb County, Georgia. He graduated from New Jersey's Seton Hall University in 2004.

Running as a professional, Hogans trained with the Holyfield International track club.

== Statistics ==
=== Personal best progression ===
400 m progression
#	Mark	Pl.	Competition	Venue	Date	Ref.
1	47.31	1st place, gold medalist(s)		Baltimore, MD	10 Jul 1999	
2	47.24	2nd place, silver medalist(s)	ColonialR	Williamsburg, VA	5 Apr 2001	
3	46.54	(silver) (Round 3)	Sea Ray	Knoxville, TN	11 Apr 2002	
4	46.39	(silver) (Heat 1)	IC4A	Princeton, NJ	17 May 2002	
5	45.86	(gold) (Round 2)	IC4A	Boston, MA	8 Mar 2003	
6	45.82	(silver) (Round 1)	NCAA	Fayetteville, AR	14 Mar 2003	
7	45.28	(gold) (Heat 1)	Big East	Storrs, CT	2 May 2003	
