= Prasanna Amarasekara =

Sri Lankan sprinter (born 1981)

Prasanna Sampath Amarasekara
Personal information
- Full name: Prasanna Sampath Amarasekara
- Born: 21 March 1981 (age 45) Sri Lanka
Medal record
Men's athletics
Representing Sri Lanka
Asian Championships
Gold medal – first place	2002 Colombo	4×400 m
Gold medal – first place	2003 Manila	4×400 m
Gold medal – first place	2007 Amman	400 m
Silver medal – second place	2005 Incheon	400 m
Silver medal – second place	2005 Incheon	4×400 m

Prasanna Sampath Amarasekara (born 21 March 1981) is a Sri Lankan track and field sprinter. He participated at the 2002, 2006, and 2010 Commonwealth Games the 2005 Asian Championships in Athletics and the 2005 World Championships in Athletics.
