= 2007 Asian Athletics Championships – Men's 400 metres =

The men's 400 metres event at the 2007 Asian Athletics Championships was held in Amman, Jordan on July 25–27.

== Medalists ==
Gold	Silver	Bronze
Prasanna Sampath Amarasekara; Sri Lanka	Reza Bouazar; Iran	Mohammad Akefian; Iran

== Results ==
=== Final ===
Rank	Lane	Name	Nationality	Time	Notes
1st place, gold medalist(s)	6	Prasanna Sampath Amarasekara	Sri Lanka	46.71	
2nd place, silver medalist(s)	3	Reza Bouazar	Iran	46.90	
3rd place, bronze medalist(s)	2	Mohammad Akefian	Iran	46.93	
4	5	K. M. Mathew	India	46.94	
5	4	Ashok Jayasundara	Sri Lanka	47.07	
6	1	Boris Khamzin	Kazakhstan	47.57	
7	8	Ismail Al-Sabani	Saudi Arabia	48.20	
	7	Amran Raj Krishnan	Malaysia	DNS	
