= Kenya at the 2025 Summer World University Games =

- Flag of Kenya
- IOC code: KEN
- National federation: Kenya University Sports Federation

in Rhine-Ruhr, Germany 16 July 2025 – 27 July 2025
- Competitors: ~40 in 4 sports
- Medals Ranked 31st: Gold 1 Silver 2 Bronze 2 Total 5

Summer World University Games appearances
- 1959; 1961; 1963; 1965; 1967; 1970; 1973; 1975; 1977; 1979; 1981; 1983; 1985; 1987; 1989; 1991; 1993; 1995; 1997; 1999; 2001; 2003; 2005; 2007; 2009; 2011; 2013; 2015; 2017; 2019; 2021; 2025; 2027

Kenya competed at the 2025 Summer World University Games in Rhine-Ruhr, Germany held from 16 to 27 July 2025. Kenya was represented by about 40 athletes and took thirty-first place in the medal table with five medals.

== Medal summary ==
=== Medal by sports ===
Rank	Sports	Gold	Silver	Bronze	Total
1	Athletics	1	1	1	3
2	Tennis	0	1	1	2
Totals (2 entries)		1	2	2	5

Source: rhineruhr2025.com

=== Medalists ===
Medal	Name	Sport	Event	Date
Gold	Brian Musau	Athletics	Men's 10,000m	23 July
Silver	Sarah Wanjiru	Athletics	Women's 10,000m	21 July
Silver	Angella Okutoyi; Kael Shah	Tennis	Mixed doubles	25 July
Bronze	Collins Kiprotich	Athletics	Men's 5000m	26 July
Bronze	Angella Okutoyi	Tennis	Women's team	26 July
