= Michael Berry (athlete) =

American sprinter (born 1991)

Personal information
- Nationality: American
- Born: December 10, 1991 (age 34)
- Height: 6 ft 0 in (1.83 m)

Sport
- Sport: Running
- Event: 400 metres
- College team: Oregon Ducks

Achievements and titles
- Personal best: 400 m: 44.75 (Des Moines 2011)
Medal record
Men's athletics
Representing the United States
World Championships
Gold medal – first place	2011 Daegu	4 × 400 m relay

Michael Berry (born December 10, 1991) is an American sprinter, who specializes in the 400 meters. Berry was part of the USA team that won the gold medal in the 4 × 400 m relay at the 2011 World Championships in Athletics.

A native of Seattle, Washington, Berry attended Rainier Beach High School. In 2010 he received a three-month ban after testing positive for cannabis.
