= Orestes Rodríguez Williams =

Cuban sprinter

Orestes Rodríguez Williams (born 3 June 1989 in Guantánamo) is a Cuban runner. He competed in the 4 × 400 m relay event at the 2012 Summer Olympics. During a local meeting in La Habana he broke the world best for the unofficial distance of 500 metres by dipping under 1 minute for the first time officially in history by clocking 59.32.
