= Shaun de Jager =

South African sprinter

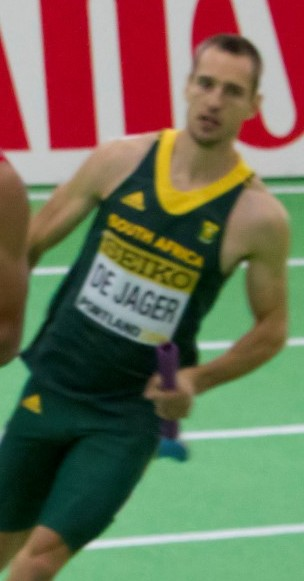
- De Jager at the 2016 IAAF World Indoor Championships

Personal information
- Nationality: South Africa
- Born: 28 June 1991 (age 35)

Sport
- Sport: Athletics
- Event: 400 m
Medal record
Men's athletics
Representing South Africa
African Championships
Bronze medal – third place	2016 Durban	4×400 m
- Updated on 27 August 2016

Shaun de Jager (born 28 June 1991 in Pretoria) is a South African sprinter. He competed in the 4 × 400 m relay event at the 2012 Summer Olympics.

At the 2012 Summer Olympics, de Jager was part of the South African team in the 4x400 metres relay race. In the first semifinal, Ofentse Mogawane fell and dislocated his shoulder when he collided with Kenya's Vincent Kiilu, resulting in South Africa's withdrawal from the race. South Africa was passed into the final on appeal to the IAAF, due to interference from the Kenyan athlete who downed Mogawane. They were assigned the 9th lane and finished in 8th place with their season's best time of 3:03.46.
