= Athletics at the 2012 Summer Olympics – Men's 4 × 400 metres relay =

Men's 4 × 400 metres relay at the Games of the XXX Olympiad
- Venue: Olympic Stadium
- Date: 9–10 August
- Teams: 16
- Winning time: 2:56.72

Medalists
1st place, gold medalist(s)		Chris Brown; Demetrius Pinder; Michael Mathieu; Ramon Miller	Bahamas
2nd place, silver medalist(s)		Bryshon Nellum; Joshua Mance; Tony McQuay; Angelo Taylor; Manteo Mitchell*	United States
3rd place, bronze medalist(s)		Lalonde Gordon; Jarrin Solomon; Ade Alleyne-Forte; Deon Lendore	Trinidad and Tobago

Video on YouTube Official Video

The men's 4 × 400 metres relay competition at the 2012 Summer Olympics in London, United Kingdom. The event was held at the Olympic Stadium on 9–10 August. It was won by the Bahamas.

The qualifying round experienced more drama than is normal in these affairs. In the first heat, on the second leg, Kenya's Vincent Mumo Kiilu was boxed in near the back of the pack, with South Africa's Ofentse Mogawane on his shoulder. Coming into the home straight, Kiilu tried to step to the outside, tripping Mogawane, leaving him injured on the track. The much awaited return of Oscar Pistorius waiting to run the third leg never materialized. South Africa filed a protest in which Kenya was disqualified and South Africa was allowed to run in the final. Conveniently, the London Olympic Stadium track has 9 lanes to accommodate such a circumstance, while normally only 8 lanes are used in Championship meets.

At the finish of the first heat, Trinidad and Tobago won the heat, setting their National Record, but host Great Britain was given exactly the same time.

In the second heat the United States led off with Manteo Mitchell. Halfway around the track, Mitchell heard a crack and felt pain.

"It felt like somebody literally just snapped my leg in half. I felt it break.'’

Mitchell continued to the hand off, running a sub-par 46.1 split. It was later revealed that Mitchell did break his left fibula. His American teammates continued on, running three sub 45 splits. Bahamas won the heat, but the Americans qualified, credited with exactly the same time as Bahamas, the fastest time in 2012. Both heats ending with the first and second place teams running the same times.

Also during the second heat, the Dominican Republic failed to make the second exchange between Felix Sánchez and Joel Mejía within the zone and were disqualified. Then halfway through the third leg, Jamaica's Jermaine Gonzales pulled a muscle and was unable to continue.

In the final, which Mitchell was unable to start, Bahamas started off with their best 400 runners, 4th place Chris Brown and 7th place Demetrius Pinder. Brown had a clear lead through the first 350 metres before fading to hand off just slightly ahead of Bryshon Nellum. Over the next leg, Josh Mance brought the American team into contention, with the two teams separating from the rest of the field. On the final straightaway, Pinder extended the lead slightly, his relay split of 43.3 credited as the 7th (now 9th) fastest relay splits in history. On the third leg, Tony McQuay passed Michael Mathieu early on the back stretch and extended the lead by a few metres. McQuay's split was reported to be 43.4. Last minute fill in Angelo Taylor took the baton in the lead, but Ramon Miller ran up to maintain contact. Coming off the final turn, he moved past Taylor with 50 meters to go and won. Trinidad and Tobago again improved their national record in winning the bronze.

Oscar Pistorius ran the anchor leg for the South African team, but they were already well beaten before he received the baton.

The fifth-placed Russian team was later disqualified when two of its members received doping bans in 2017 after a re-test of their samples.

== Records ==
Prior to the competition, the existing World and Olympic records were as follows.

World record	United States (Andrew Valmon, Quincy Watts, Butch Reynolds, Michael Johnson)	2:54.29	Stuttgart, Germany	22 August 1993
Olympic record	United States (LaShawn Merritt, Angelo Taylor, David Neville, Jeremy Wariner)	2:55.39	Beijing, China	23 August 2008
2012 World leading	(United States) University of Florida (Dedric Dukes, Hugh Graham Jr., Leonardo Seymore, Tony McQuay)	3:00.02	Des Moines, United States	9 June 2012
Broken records during the 2012 Summer Olympics
2012 World leading	Bahamas (Chris Brown, Demetrius Pinder, Michael Mathieu, Ramon Miller)	2:56.72	London, United Kingdom	10 August 2012

The Following new National records were set during this competition

Bahamas National Record	Chris Brown, Demetrius Pinder, Michael Mathieu, Ramon Miller (BAH)	2:56.72
Trinidad and Tobago National Record	Lalonde Gordon, Jarrin Solomon, Ade Alleyne-Forte, Deon Lendore (TRI)	2:59.40

== Schedule ==
All times are British Summer Time (UTC+1)

Date	Time	Round
Thursday, 9 August 2012	11:35	Round 1
Friday, 10 August 2012	21:20	Finals

== Results ==
- Q denotes automatic qualification (based on place).
- q denotes provisional qualification (fastest non-automatic qualifiers).
- DNS denotes did not start.
- DNF denotes did not finish.
- DQ denotes disqualified
- AR denotes area record.
- NR denotes national record.
- PB denotes personal best.
- SB denotes season's best.

=== Round 1 ===
Qual. rule: first 3 of each heat (Q) plus the 2 fastest times (q) qualified.

Official Video of Round 1

Heat 1

Rank	Nation	Competitors	Time	Notes
1	Trinidad and Tobago	Lalonde Gordon, Jarrin Solomon, Ade Alleyne-Forte, Deon Lendore	3:00.38	Q, NR
2	Great Britain	Nigel Levine, Conrad Williams, Jack Green, Martyn Rooney	3:00.38	Q, SB
3	Cuba	William Collazo, Raidel Acea, Orestes Rodriguez, Omar Cisneros	3:00.55	Q
4	Belgium	Nils Duerinck, Jonathan Borlée, Antoine Gillet, Kevin Borlée	3:01.70	q
5	Poland	Piotr Wiaderek, Marcin Marciniszyn, Michał Pietrzak, Kacper Kozłowski	3:02.86	
6	Germany	Jonas Plass, Kamghe Gaba, Eric Kruger, Thomas Schneider	3:03.50	
—	South Africa	Shaun de Jager, Ofentse Mogawane, Oscar Pistorius, Willem de Beer	—	DNF*
—	Kenya	Boniface Ontuga Mweresa, Vincent Mumo Kiilu, Boniface Mucheru, Alphas Leken Kishoyian	—	DQ

Note: *South Africa's Ofentse Mogawane was injured in a collision with Kenya's Vincent Mumo Kiilu and failed to hand over to Oscar Pistorius who was supposed to run the third leg.

Heat 2

Rank	Nation	Competitors	Time	Notes
1	Bahamas	Ramon Miller, Demetrius Pinder, Michael Mathieu, Chris Brown	2:58.87	Q, SB
2	United States	Manteo Mitchell^{[a]}, Joshua Mance, Tony McQuay, Bryshon Nellum	2:58.87	Q, SB
3	Russia	Maksim Dyldin, Denis Alekseyev, Vladimir Krasnov, Pavel Trenikhin	3:02.01	Q
4	Venezuela	Arturo Ramírez, Alberto Aguilar, Albert Bravo, Jose Melendez	3:02.62	q
5	Australia	Steven Solomon, Ben Offereins, Brendan Cole, John Steffensen	3:03.17	
6	Japan	Kei Takase, Yuzo Kanemaru, Yoshihiro Azuma, Hiroyuki Nakano	3:03.86	
—	Jamaica	Dane Hyatt, Riker Hylton, Jermaine Gonzales, Errol Nolan	—	DNF
—	Dominican Republic	Gustavo Cuesta, Félix Sánchez, Joel Mejia, Luguelín Santos	—	DQ

^{a} At approximately the 200-metre mark of the first leg, American runner Manteo Mitchell broke his left fibula. However, he still managed to finish his leg with a time of 46.1.

=== Final ===
Rank	Lane	Nation	Competitors	Time	Notes
1st place, gold medalist(s)	4	Bahamas	Chris Brown, Demetrius Pinder, Michael Mathieu, Ramon Miller	2:56.72	WL, NR
2nd place, silver medalist(s)	7	United States	Bryshon Nellum, Joshua Mance, Tony McQuay, Angelo Taylor	2:57.05	SB
3rd place, bronze medalist(s)	5	Trinidad and Tobago	Lalonde Gordon, Jarrin Solomon, Ade Alleyne-Forte, Deon Lendore	2:59.40	NR
4	6	Great Britain	Conrad Williams, Jack Green, Dai Greene, Martyn Rooney	2:59.53	SB
5	8	Belgium	Kevin Borlée, Antoine Gillet, Jonathan Borlée, Michael Bultheel	3:01.83	
6	3	Venezuela	Arturo Ramírez, Alberto Aguilar, Albert Bravo, Omar Longart	3:02.18	
7	1	South Africa	Shaun de Jager, Willem de Beer, Louis van Zyl, Oscar Pistorius	3:03.46	SB
	9	Cuba	William Collazo, Raidel Acea, Orestes Rodriguez, Omar Cisneros	DNF	
	2	Russia	Maksim Dyldin, Denis Alekseyev, Vladimir Krasnov, Pavel Trenikhin	DQ (3:00.09)	Doping

Note: South Africa was allowed to continue as the ninth finalists on appeal. Louis van Zyl replaced the injured Ofentse Mogawane.
