= Konstantin Svechkar =

Russian sprinter

Medal record

Representing Russia

Men's athletics

IAAF World Indoor Championships
| Bronze medal – third place | 2006 Moscow | 4 x 400 m relay |

Summer Universiade
| Bronze medal – third place | 2005 Izmir | 4 x 400 m relay |

European Indoor Championships
| Silver medal – second place | 2013 Gothenburg | 4 x 400 m relay |

Konstantin Svechkar (born 17 July 1984) is a Russian sprinter who specializes in the 400 metres.

Svechkar won bronze medals in 4 x 400 metres relay at the 2005 Universiade, together with teammates Dmitriy Petrov, Alexander Borshchenko and Vladislav Frolov, and at the 2006 World Indoor Championships with Aleksandr Derevyagin, Yevgeniy Lebedev and Dmitriy Petrov.

His personal best time is 46.09 seconds, achieved in July 2005 in Erfurt.
