= Yoshihiro Horigome =

Japanese sprinter

Personal information
- Nationality: Japanese
- Born: 2 January 1981 (age 45) Miyagi Prefecture, Japan
- Education: Nippon Sport Science University
- Height: 1.70 m (5 ft 7 in)
- Weight: 61 kg (134 lb)

Sport
- Country: Japan
- Sport: Track and field
- Event: 400 metres
- Personal best: 45.77 (Yokohama 2006)
Medal record
Men's athletics
Representing Japan
East Asian Games
Gold medal – first place	2005 Macau	400 m
Gold medal – first place	2005 Macau	4×400 m relay
Gold medal – first place	2009 Hong Kong	4×400 m relay
Universiade
Silver medal – second place	2005 İzmir	4×400 m relay

Yoshihiro Horigome (堀籠 佳宏, Horigome Yoshihiro; born 2 January 1981) is a retired Japanese sprinter who specializes in the 400 metres.

His personal best time is 45.77 seconds, achieved in September 2006 in Yokohama.

== Achievements ==
Year	Tournament	Venue	Result	Extra
2003	Universiade	Daegu, South Korea	4th	4 × 400 m relay
2005	Universiade	İzmir, Turkey	2nd	4 × 400 m relay
