= 2006 IAAF World Indoor Championships =

11th IAAF World Indoor Championships
- Host city: Moscow, Russia
- Venue: Olympic Stadium
- Events: 26
- Participation: 562 athletes from 129 nations

The 11th IAAF World Indoor Championships in Athletics under the auspices of the International Association of Athletics Federations (IAAF) was held in Moscow from March 10 to March 12, 2006 in the Olimpiyski Sport arena.

The announcement by the IAAF in November 2003 was a blow to Madrid, which was also in the running to hold the event but Spain had already held the competition twice. This was the first major senior athletics competition to be held in the country since the highly boycotted 1980 Summer Olympics.

The majority of athletes from Great Britain, Australia and Jamaica, amongst other countries, did not attend the Championships, due to the coinciding 2006 Commonwealth Games.

== Results ==
=== Men ===
2003 | 2004 | 2006 | 2008 | 2010

Games	Gold		Silver		Bronze	
60 m	Leonard Scott; United States	6.50 (WL)	Andrey Yepishin; Russia	6.52 (NR)	Terrence Trammell; United States	6.54
400 m	Alleyne Francique; Grenada	45.54 (SB)	California Molefe; Botswana	45.75	Chris Brown; Bahamas	45.78 (NR)
800 m	Wilfred Bungei; Kenya	1:47.15	Mbulaeni Mulaudzi; South Africa	1:47.16	Yuriy Borzakovskiy; Russia	1:47.38
1500 m	Ivan Heshko; Ukraine	3:42.08	Daniel Kipchirchir Komen; Kenya	3:42.55	Elkanah Onkware Angwenyi; Kenya	3:42.98
3000 m	Kenenisa Bekele; Ethiopia	7:39.32	Saif Saaeed Shaheen; Qatar	7:41.28	Eliud Kipchoge; Kenya	7:42.58
60 m hurdles	Terrence Trammell; United States	7.43 (WL)	Dayron Robles; Cuba	7.46 (PB)	Dominique Arnold; United States	7.52
4 × 400 m relay	United States (USA); Tyree Washington; LaShawn Merritt; Milton Campbell; Wallace Spearmon; James Davis*; O.J. Hogans*	3:03.24	Poland (POL); Daniel Dąbrowski; Marcin Marciniszyn; Rafał Wieruszewski; Piotr Klimczak; Paweł Ptak*; Piotr Kędzia*	3:04.67 (SB)	Russia (RUS); Konstantin Svechkar; Aleksandr Derevyagin; Yevgeniy Lebedev; Dmitriy Petrov; Andrey Polukeyev*	3:06.91 (SB)
High jump	Yaroslav Rybakov; Russia	2.37 (WL)	Andrey Tereshin; Russia	2.35 (WL)	Linus Thörnblad; Sweden	2.33 (PB)
Pole vault	Brad Walker; United States	5.80 (SB)	Alhaji Jeng; Sweden	5.70	Tim Lobinger; Germany	5.60
Long jump	Ignisious Gaisah; Ghana	8.30	Irving Saladino; Panama	8.29 (AR)	Andrew Howe; Italy	8.19 (PB)
Triple jump	Walter Davis; United States	17.73 (PB)	Jadel Gregório; Brazil	17.56 (AR)	Yoandri Betanzos; Cuba	17.42 (PB)
Shot put	Reese Hoffa; United States	22.11 (WL)	Joachim Olsen; Denmark	21.16	Pavel Sofin; Russia	20.68
Heptathlon	André Niklaus; Germany	6192 (PB)	Bryan Clay; United States	6187 (SB)	Roman Šebrle; Czech Republic	6161 (SB)
Heptathlon	(7.06 - 7.64 - 14.41 - 2.07 - 8.14 - 5.30 - 2:47.80)		(6.67 - 7.74 - 13.89 - 2.10 - 7.83 - 4.60 - 2:50.92)		(7.10 - 7.76 - 15.74 - 2.10 - 8.08 - 4.80 - 2:49.38)	
WR world record | AR area record | CR championship record | GR games record | NR national record | OR Olympic record | PB personal best | SB season best | WL world leading (in a given season)

=== Women ===
2003 | 2004 | 2006 | 2008 | 2010

Event	Gold		Silver		Bronze	
60 m	Me'Lisa Barber; United States	7.01 (WL)	Lauryn Williams; United States	7.01 (WL)	Kim Gevaert; Belgium	7.11 (NR)
400 m	Olesya Krasnomovets; Russia	50.04 (CR)	Vania Stambolova; Bulgaria	50.21 (NR)	Christine Amertil; Bahamas	50.34 (AR)
800 m	Maria de Lurdes Mutola; Mozambique	1:58.90 (SB)	Kenia Sinclair; Jamaica	1:59.54 (NR)	Hasna Benhassi; Morocco	2:00.34 (SB)
1500 m	Yuliya Chizhenko; Russia	4:04.70	Yelena Soboleva; Russia	4:05.21	Maryam Yusuf Jamal; Bahrain	4:05.53
3000 m	Meseret Defar; Ethiopia	8:38.80	Liliya Shobukhova; Russia	8:42.18	Lidia Chojecka; Poland	8:42.59 (SB)
60 m hurdles	Derval O'Rourke; Ireland	7.84 (NR)	Glory Alozie; Spain	7.86 (SB)	Susanna Kallur; Sweden	7.87
4 × 400 m relay	Russia (RUS); Tatyana Levina; Natalya Nazarova; Olesya Krasnomovets; Natalya Antyukh; Yulia Gushchina*; Tatyana Veshkurova*	3:24.91	United States (USA); Debbie Dunn; Tiffany Williams; Monica Hargrove; Mary Danner; Kia Davis*	3:28.63 (SB)	Belarus (BLR); Natallia Solohub; Anna Kozak; Yulyana Zhalniaruk; Ilona Usovich	3:28.65
High jump	Yelena Slesarenko; Russia	2.02 (SB)	Blanka Vlašić; Croatia	2.00	Ruth Beitia; Spain	1.98 (SB)
Pole vault	Yelena Isinbayeva; Russia	4.80	Anna Rogowska; Poland	4.75	Svetlana Feofanova; Russia	4.70 (SB)
Long jump	Tianna Madison; United States †	6.80 (PB)	Naide Gomes; Portugal	6.76	Concepción Montaner; Spain	6.76
Triple jump	Tatyana Lebedeva; Russia	14.95 (WL)	Anna Pyatykh; Russia	14.93 (PB)	Yamilé Aldama; Sudan	14.86 (SB)
Shot put	Natallia Kharaneka; Belarus	19.84 (PB)	Nadine Kleinert; Germany	19.64 (PB)	Olga Ryabinkina; Russia	19.24 (SB)
Pentathlon (60 m H, HJ, SP, LJ, 800 m)	Lyudmila Blonska; Ukraine	4685 (PB)	Karin Ruckstuhl; Netherlands	4607	Olga Levenkova; Russia	4579
Pentathlon (60 m H, HJ, SP, LJ, 800 m)	(8.29 - 1.84 - 13.43 - 6.50 - 2:19.62)		(8.47 - 1.81 - 13.64 - 6.33 - 2:16.72)		(8.55 - 1.78 - 13.20 - 6.44 - 2:15.12)	
WR world record | AR area record | CR championship record | GR games record | NR national record | OR Olympic record | PB personal best | SB season best | WL world leading (in a given season)

† Tatyana Kotova was the original winner with 7.00m, but was stripped of the title in 2013 after retested samples from the 2005 World Championships found her to have been doping. All her results from August 2005 to July 2007 were subsequently annulled.

== Medal table ==
Rank	Nation	Gold	Silver	Bronze	Total
1	United States (USA)	8	3	2	13
2	Russia (RUS)	7	5	6	18
3	Ethiopia (ETH)	2	0	0	2
3	Ukraine (UKR)	2	0	0	2
5	Kenya (KEN)	1	1	2	4
6	Germany (GER)	1	1	1	3
7	Belarus (BLR)	1	0	1	2
8	Ghana (GHA)	1	0	0	1
8	Grenada (GRN)	1	0	0	1
8	Ireland (IRL)	1	0	0	1
8	Mozambique (MOZ)	1	0	0	1
12	Poland (POL)	0	2	1	3
13	Spain (ESP)	0	1	2	3
13	Sweden (SWE)	0	1	2	3
15	Cuba (CUB)	0	1	1	2
16	Botswana (BOT)	0	1	0	1
16	Brazil (BRA)	0	1	0	1
16	Bulgaria (BUL)	0	1	0	1
16	Croatia (CRO)	0	1	0	1
16	Denmark (DEN)	0	1	0	1
16	Jamaica (JAM)	0	1	0	1
16	Netherlands (NED)	0	1	0	1
16	Panama (PAN)	0	1	0	1
16	Portugal (POR)	0	1	0	1
16	Qatar (QAT)	0	1	0	1
16	South Africa (RSA)	0	1	0	1
27	Bahamas (BAH)	0	0	2	2
28	Bahrain (BHR)	0	0	1	1
28	Belgium (BEL)	0	0	1	1
28	Czech Republic (CZE)	0	0	1	1
28	Italy (ITA)	0	0	1	1
28	Morocco (MAR)	0	0	1	1
28	Sudan (SUD)	0	0	1	1
Totals (33 entries)		26	26	26	78

== Participating nations ==
- Albania (2)
- Algeria (2)
- Andorra (1)
- Armenia (1)
- Aruba (1)
- Austria (3)
- Azerbaijan (1)
- Bahamas (7)
- Bahrain (4)
- Belarus (9)
- Belgium (3)
- Bolivia (1)
- Bosnia and Herzegovina (1)
- Botswana (1)
- Brazil (14)
- Bulgaria (9)
- Cameroon (1)
- Canada (2)
- Chile (1)
- China (11)
- Chinese Taipei (2)
- Colombia (2)
- Comoros (1)
- Ivory Coast (2)
- Croatia (2)
- Cuba (11)
- Cyprus (1)
- Czech Republic (7)
- Denmark (3)
- Dominica (1)
- Dominican Republic (6)
- Estonia (1)
- Ethiopia (6)
- Finland (4)
- France (25)
- French Polynesia (1)
- Georgia (1)
- Germany (16)
- Ghana (2)
- Great Britain (14)
- Greece (3)
- Grenada (1)
- Guam (1)
- Guyana (2)
- Haiti (3)
- Honduras (1)
- Hong Kong (1)
- Hungary (3)
- Iceland (1)
- Indonesia (1)
- India (1)
- Iran (1)
- Ireland (9)
- Israel (1)
- Italy (14)
- Jamaica (18)
- Japan (3)
- Jordan (1)
- Kazakhstan (3)
- Kenya (6)
- Kyrgyzstan (2)
- Laos (1)
- Latvia (3)
- Lebanon (1)
- Lithuania (2)
- Luxembourg (1)
- Macau (2)
- Macedonia (1)
- Maldives (1)
- Malta (1)
- Mexico (1)
- Moldova (1)
- Monaco (1)
- Morocco (8)
- Mozambique (1)
- Nauru (1)
- Netherlands (5)
- Nicaragua (1)
- Nigeria (4)
- Northern Mariana Islands (1)
- Norway (1)
- Pakistan (1)
- Palau (1)
- Palestine (1)
- Panama (1)
- Paraguay (1)
- Peru (1)
- Poland (21)
- Portugal (3)
- Puerto Rico (2)
- Qatar (5)
- Republic of the Congo (1)
- Romania (15)
- Russia (57)
- Rwanda (1)
- Saint Vincent and the Grenadines (1)
- El Salvador (1)
- Samoa (1)
- San Marino (1)
- Saudi Arabia (1)
- Senegal (1)
- Serbia and Montenegro (2)
- Seychelles (1)
- Singapore (1)
- Slovakia (3)
- Slovenia (4)
- Solomon Islands (1)
- South Africa (4)
- South Korea (1)
- Spain (19)
- Sudan (1)
- Sweden (13)
- Switzerland (2)
- Tajikistan (1)
- Tanzania (1)
- Thailand (1)
- Togo (1)
- Trinidad and Tobago (2)
- Turkey (3)
- Turkmenistan (1)
- Turks and Caicos Islands (1)
- Uganda (1)
- Ukraine (27)
- United States (51)
- United States Virgin Islands (1)
- Uruguay (1)
- Uzbekistan (2)
- Yemen (1)
- Zambia (1)
