= Volodymyr Demchenko =

Ukrainian sprinter

Volodymyr Vitaliovych Demchenko (born 16 April 1981) is a Ukrainian sprinter who competed in the 2004 Summer Olympics.
