= Rudolf Götz =

Czech sprinter

Personal information
- Nationality: Czech Republic
- Born: 10 April 1983 (age 43) Prague, Czechoslovakia
- Height: 1.78 m (5 ft 10 in)
- Weight: 67 kg (148 lb)

Sport
- Sport: Athletics
- Event: Sprint
- Club: ASK Slavia Praha
- Coached by: Petr Novotny

Achievements and titles
- Personal best: 400 m: 45.78 s (2008)

Rudolf Götz (born 10 April 1983 in Prague) is a Czech sprinter, who specialized in the 400 metres. He set a personal best time of 45.78 seconds at the 2008 Ostrava Golden Spike in Ostrava, earning him a spot on the Czech track and field team for the Olympics. He is also a member of the athletics team for ASK Slavia Praha, and is coached and trained by Petr Novotny.

Gotz represented the Czech Republic at the 2008 Summer Olympics in Beijing, where he competed for the men's 400 metres. He ran in the fourth heat against seven other athletes, including Great Britain's Martyn Rooney and Jamaica's Ricardo Chambers, both of whom were heavy favorites in this event. He finished the race in sixth place by one hundredth of a second (0.01) ahead of Japan's Yuzo Kanemaru, with a time of 46.38 seconds. Gotz, however, failed to advance into the semi-finals, as he placed forty-second overall, and was ranked farther below three mandatory slots for the next round.
