= Andriy Tverdostup =

Ukrainian sprinter

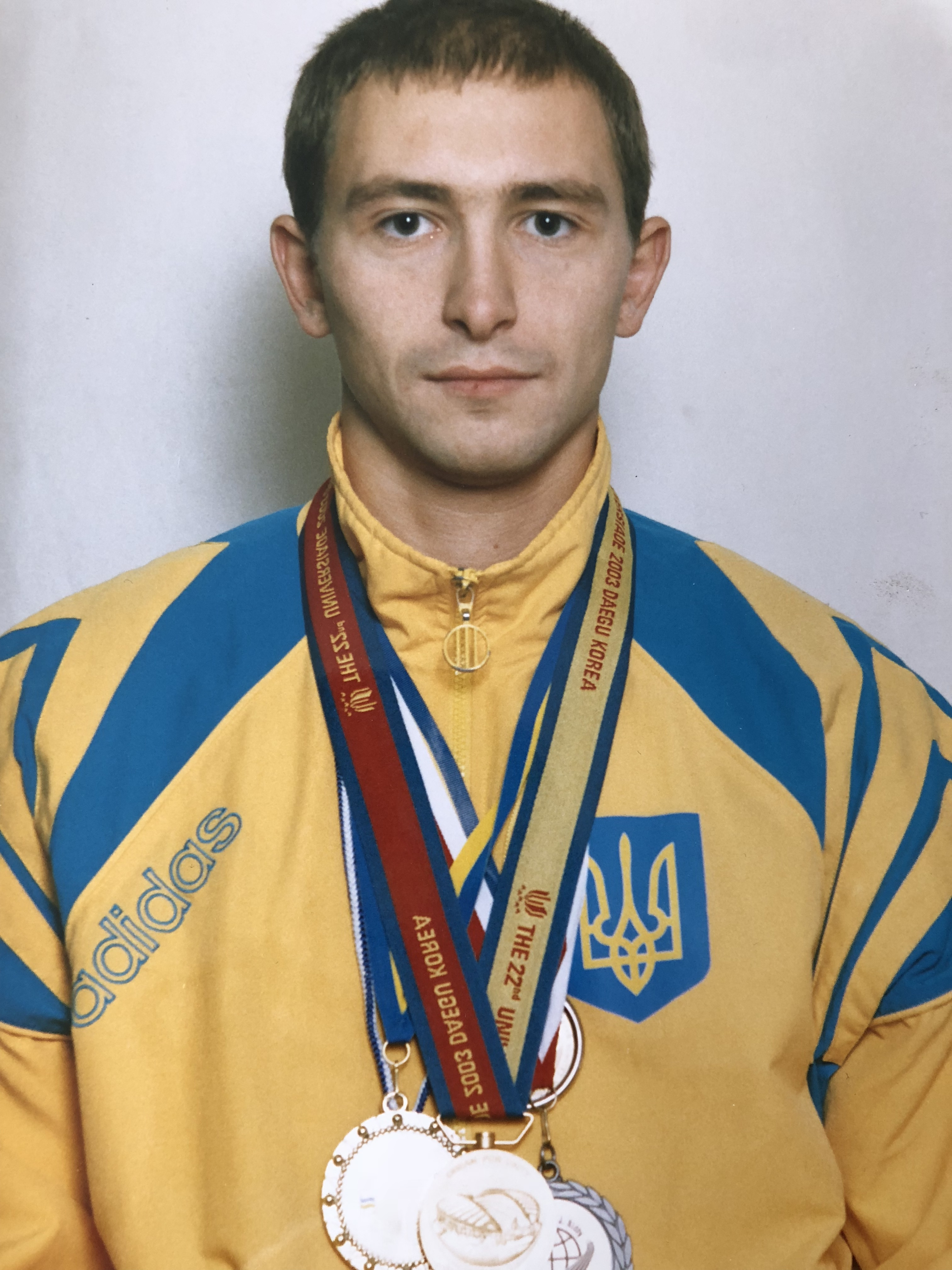
- Andriy Tverdostup during 2004 Summer Olympics

Personal information
- Born: June 18, 1977 (age 49) Kropyvnytskyi, Soviet Union

Sport
- Sport: Track and field
Medal record
Representing Ukraine
Summer Universiade
Gold medal – first place	2003 Daegu	400 m
Gold medal – first place	2003 Daegu	4 x 400m relay
Silver medal – second place	2001 Beijing	4 x 400m relay
Bronze medal – third place	2001 Beijing	400 m

Andriy Volodimirovich Tverdostup (Ukrainian: Андрій Володимирович Твердоступ, born June 18, 1977) is a Ukrainian sprinter who competed in the 2004 Summer Olympics. He is a member of Ukrainian National track and field Team (1996-2008) and a Member of Athletics Federation of Ukraine.

== Competition record ==
Year	Competition	Venue	Position	Event	Notes
Representing Ukraine
1996	Cup of Ukraine	Kyiv, Ukraine	2nd	400 m	
1996	World Junior Championships	Sydney, Australia	15th	400 m	
1996	European Championships Sports Clubs	Magliano, Italy	3rd	400 m	
1997	Ukrainian Championships	Lviv, Ukraine	2nd	400 m	
1997	Cup of Ukraine	Kyiv, Ukraine	3rd	400 m	
1997	European Cup	Prague, Czech Republic	3rd	4 x 400 m relay	
1998	Ukrainian Championships	Lviv, Ukraine	1st	400 m	
1998	European Cup	Budapest, Hungary	2nd	4 x 400 m relay	
1998	Grand Prix	Sopot, Poland	3rd	4 x 100 m relay	
1999	Ukrainian Championships	Lviv, Ukraine	1st	800 m	
1999	European Cup	Saint Petersburg, Russia	1st	4 x 400 m relay	
2000	Ukrainian Championships	Lviv, Ukraine	2nd	400 m	
2001	Ukrainian Championships	Lviv, Ukraine	1st	400 m	
2001	World Championships	Edmonton, Canada	11th	4 x 400 m relay	
2001	Summer Universiade	Beijing, China	3rd	400 m	
2001	Summer Universiade	Beijing, China	2nd	4 x 400 m relay	
2002	Ukrainian Cup	Kyiv, Ukraine	1st	400 m	
2002	Ukrainian Championships	Kyiv, Ukraine	1st	400 m	
2002	Ukrainian Championships	Kyiv, Ukraine	1st	4 x 400 m relay	
2002	Grand Prix	Sopot, Poland	2nd	400 m	
2002	Grand Prix	Nitra, Slovakia	1st	400 m	
2003	Ukrainian Cup	Kyiv, Ukraine	1st	400 m	
2003	European Cup	Ljubljana, Slovenia	2nd	4 x 400 m relay	
2003	Summer Universiade	Daegu, South Korea	1st	400 m	
2003	Summer Universiade	Daegu, South Korea	1st	4 x 400 m relay	
2004	Ukrainian Cup	Kyiv, Ukraine	2nd	400 m	
2004	European Cup	Sofia, Bulgaria	1st	4 x 400 m relay	
2004	Ukrainian Championships	Yalta, Ukraine	1st	400 m	
2004	Summer Olympics	Athens, Greece	10th	4 x 400 m relay	
2005	European Cup	Lier, Portugal	2nd	4 x 400 m relay	
2005	Ukrainian Championships	Kyiv, Ukraine	1st	400 m	
2005	World Championships	Helsinki, Finland	9th	400 m	
2005	Summer Universiade	Izmir, Turkey	5th	400 m	
2006	European Cup	Malaga, Spain	5th	4 x 400 m relay	
2006	Ukrainian Championships	Kharkiv, Ukraine	3rd	400 m	
2006	European Championships	Gothenburg, Sweden	5th	4 x 400 m relay	

== Education ==
He went in Kharkiv National University from 1994 to 2001. He is a specialist in physical education, coach and sport manager of the following athletes:

- Gorbachev Pavel - run with obstacles 400m (Championship of Ukraine 60m run with obstacles - 2nd place)
- Bikulov Dmytriy - run 400m
- Tverdostup Tamara - run 800m and run 1500m
