= Shane Victor =

South African sprinter

Personal information
- Nationality: South Africa
- Born: 29 December 1988 (age 37)

Sport
- Sport: Athletics
- Event: 400 metres

Achievements and titles
- Personal best: 400 m 46.13 (Durban 2011)
Medal record
Men's athletics
Representing South Africa
World Championships
Silver medal – second place	2011 Daegu	4 × 400 m relay

Shane Victor (born 29 December 1988) is a South African sprinter who specializes in the 400 metres. He won a silver medal in the 4 × 400 m relay at the 2011 World Championships in Athletics in Daegu.

At the 2012 Summer Olympics, Victor was part of the South African team in the 4x400 metres relay race. In the first semifinal, Ofentse Mogawane fell and dislocated his shoulder when he collided with Kenya's Vincent Kiilu, resulting in South Africa's withdrawal from the race. South Africa was passed into the final on appeal to the IAAF, due to interference from the Kenyan athlete who downed Mogawane. They were assigned the 9th lane and finished in 8th place with their season's best time of 3:03.46.
