= Willem de Beer =

South African sprinter

Willem "Willebeer" de Beer
Personal information
- Nationality: South Africa
- Born: 14 March 1988 (age 38) Pretoria, South Africa
- Height: 1.88 m (6 ft 2 in)
- Weight: 75 kg (165 lb)

Sport
- Sport: Athletics
- Events: 400 metres, 200 metres and 800 meters
- College team: University of Pretoria (Tuks)
- Club: Willebeer Athletics (2018 onwards)

Achievements and titles
- Personal best: 400 m 45.67 (Porto-Novo 2012) 200 m 21.18 (Pretoria 2012) 800 m 1:52.59 (Pretoria 2014)
Medal record
Men's athletics
Representing South Africa
World Championships
Silver medal – second place	2011 Daegu	4 × 400 m relay
African Championships
Silver medal – second place	2012 Porto-Novo	4 × 400 m relay
Bronze medal – third place	2012 Porto-Novo	400 metres
Summer Universiade
Bronze medal – third place	2011 Shenzhen	4 × 400 m relay
World Youth Championships
Bronze medal – third place	2005 Marrakesh	Medley relay

Willem Frederik Andries de Beer (born 14 March 1988) is a South African sprinter who specializes in the 400 metres.

He won a silver medal in the 4 × 400 m relay at the 2011 World Championships in Athletics in Daegu.

At the 2012 Summer Olympics, de Beer was part of the South African team in the 4 x 400 metres relay semifinal, where he was to run the final leg. In the second leg Ofentse Mogawane collided with Kenya's Vincent Mumo Kiilu, resulting in South Africa's withdrawal from the race. South Africa was passed into the final on appeal to the IAAF, due to interference from the Kenyan athlete who downed Mogawane. They were assigned the 9th lane. He ran the second leg in the final in which South Africa finished eighth.
