= Vladislav Frolov =

Russian sprinter (born 1980)

Medal record

Men's athletics

Representing Russia

Olympic Games
Disqualified	2008 Beijing	4 × 400 m relay

European Championships
Silver medal – second place	2006 Gothenburg	400 metres

European Indoor Championships
Silver medal – second place	2007 Birmingham	4 × 400 m relay

Vladislav Yuryevich Frolov (Russian: Владислав Юрьевич Фролов) (born 24 July 1980 in Tambov) is a Russian sprint athlete.

He won the silver medal in the 400 metres at the 2006 European Athletics Championships in Gothenburg, running a personal best of 45.09 s.

At the 2007 European Indoor Athletics Championships he won a silver medal in the 4 x 400 metres relay, with teammates Ivan Buzolin, Maksim Dyldin and Artem Sergeyenkov. The Russian team originally finished third, after Russia's anchor runner Sergeyenkov was pushed by Germany's Bastian Swillims when the latter advanced past Sergeyenkov on the last lap. However, the incident resulted in the disqualification of the victorious German team and the subsequent promotion of Russia to second place.

Frolov was part of the team that finished third in Men's 4 × 400 m relay at the 2008 Summer Olympics, but the team was disqualified after teammate Denis Alekseyev tested positive for doping.
