= Dmitry Petrov (sprinter) =

Russian sprinter

Dmitriy Petrov (Russian: Дмитрий Петров; born 4 January 1982) is a Russian sprinter who specializes in the 400 metres.

At the 2006 IAAF World Indoor Championships in Moscow he finished sixth in the 400 metres and won a bronze medal in 4 x 400 metres relay.

His personal best time over 400 m is 46.38 seconds, achieved in May 2001 in Krasnodar.
