= 2006 IAAF World Cup – Results =

These are the results of the 2006 IAAF World Cup, which took place in Athens, Greece on 16 and 17 September.

Five continental teams were present (Africa, America, Asia, Europe, and Oceania) and three full national teams competed (United States, Russia and host nation Greece). Furthermore – following victories at the 2006 European Cup on the men's and women's sides respectively – France fielded a men's team, while Poland fielded a women's team.

== Track ==
Events
100 m	200 m	400 m	800 m	1500 m	3000 m	5000 m	100/110 m h	400 m h	3000 m st	4 × 100 m relay	4 × 400 m relay

=== 100 m ===
==== Men ====
Rank	Team	Competitor	Result
1	USA	Tyson Gay	9.88
2	EUR	Francis Obikwelu	10.09
3	AME	Marc Burns	10.14
4	AFR	Uchenna Emedolu	10.14 SB
5	FRA	Ronald Pognon	10.17
6	ASI	Yaozu Yang	10.21 PB
7	RUS	Andrey Yepishin	10.27
8	OCE	Patrick Johnson	10.28
9	GRE	Anastasios Gousis	10.34

==== Women ====
Rank	Team	Competitor	Result
1	AME	Sherone Simpson	10.97
2	USA	Torri Edwards	11.19
3	AFR	Vida Anim	11.21 SB
4	EUR	Kim Gevaert	11.24
5	RUS	Yuliya Gushchina	11.39
6	GRE	Yeoryia Kokloni	11.40
7	ASI	Guzel Khubbieva	11.43 SB
8	OCE	Sally McLellan	11.44
9	POL	Daria Onyśko	11.49

=== 200 m ===
==== Men ====
Rank	Team	Competitor	Result
1	USA	Wallace Spearmon	19.87
2	AME	Usain Bolt	19.96
3	ASI	Shingo Suetsugu	20.30
4	EUR	Francis Obikwelu	20.36
5	OCE	Patrick Johnson	20.52
6	GRE	Anastasios Gousis	20.69
7	RUS	Ivan Teplykh	20.94
8	AFR	Stéphan Buckland	20.96
9	FRA	Manuel Reynaert	21.87

==== Women ====
Rank	Team	Competitor	Result
1	USA	Sanya Richards	22.23
2	EUR	Kim Gevaert	22.72
3	AFR	Vida Anim	22.81 PB
4	RUS	Yuliya Gushchina	22.96
5	POL	Monika Bejnar	23.21
6	ASI	Guzel Khubbieva	23.34
7	AME	Cydonie Mothersille	23.50
8	GRE	Hariklia Bouda	23.52
9	OCE	Melanie Kleeberg	23.86

=== 400 m ===
==== Men ====
Rank	Team	Competitor	Result
1	USA	LaShawn Merritt	44.54
2	AFR	Gary Kikaya	44.66
3	GRE	Dimitrios Regas	45.11 NR
4	AME	Alleyne Francique	45.30
5	EUR	Daniel Dąbrowski	45.61
6	RUS	Vladislav Frolov	45.76
7	FRA	Marc Raquil	46.26
8	OCE	Clinton Hill	46.41
9	ASI	Rohan Pradeep Kumara	47.35

==== Women ====
Rank	Team	Competitor	Result
1	USA	Sanya Richards	48.70 WL
2	EUR	Vanja Stambolova	50.09
3	AME	Novlene Williams	50.24
4	RUS	Tatyana Veshkurova	50.50
5	GRE	Fani Halkia	50.94 SB
6	AFR	Amy Mbacké Thiam	51.39
7	ASI	Olga Tereshkova	52.57
8	POL	Grażyna Prokopek	53.29
9	OCE	Rosemary Hayward	54.01

=== 800 m ===
==== Men ====
Rank	Team	Competitor	Result
1	ASI	Yusuf Saad Kamel	1:44.98
2	EUR	Bram Som	1:45.13
3	AFR	Mbulaeni Mulaudzi	1:45.14
4	AME	Gary Reed	1:45.54
5	RUS	Dmitriy Bogdanov	1:46.31
6	USA	Khadevis Robinson	1:46.45
7	FRA	Florent Lacasse	1:47.30
8	OCE	Jason Stewart	1:49.01
9	GRE	Efthimios Papadopoulos	1:49.45

==== Women ====
Rank	Team	Competitor	Result
1	AME	Zulia Calatayud	2:00.06
2	AFR	Janeth Jepkosgei	2:00.09
3	RUS	Olga Kotlyarova	2:00.84
4	EUR	Rebecca Lyne	2:00.97
5	POL	Aneta Lemiesz	2:01.53
6	USA	Hazel Clark	2:01.83
7	ASI	Pinki Pramanik	2:03.28
8	GRE	Eleni Filandra	2:05.14
9	OCE	Libby Allen	2:07.31

=== 1500 m ===
==== Men ====
Rank	Team	Competitor	Result
1	AFR	Alex Kipchirchir	3:52.60
2	EUR	Ivan Heshko	3:53.33
3	OCE	Nicholas Willis	3:54.76
4	USA	Gabriel Jennings	3:55.09
5	RUS	Ramil Aritkulov	3:55.11
6	AME	Nathan Brannen	3:55.16
7	ASI	Abdulrahman Suleiman	3:55.67
8	FRA	Mahiedine Mekhissi-Benabbad	3:55.89
9	GRE	Panayiotis Ikonomou	3:59.00

==== Women ====
Rank	Team	Competitor	Result
1	ASI	Maryam Yusuf Jamal	4:00.84
2	RUS	Tatyana Tomashova	4:02.45
3	OCE	Sarah Jamieson	4:02.82
4	EUR	Daniela Yordanova	4:02.97
5	POL	Lidia Chojecka	4:06.52
6	AME	Carmen Douma-Hussar	4:07.36
7	AFR	Nouria Mérah-Benida	4:10.25
8	USA	Treniere Clement	4:13.55
9	GRE	Kalliopi Astropekaki	4:40.68

=== 3000 m ===
==== Men ====
Rank	Team	Competitor	Result
1	OCE	Craig Mottram	7:32.19 CR
2	AFR	Kenenisa Bekele	7:36.25
3	FRA	Driss Maazouzi	7:47.80 SB
4	AME	Kevin Sullivan	7:47.99
5	USA	Adam Goucher	7:48.15
6	EUR	Jesús España	7:50.09
7	RUS	Sergey Ivanov	7:52.80
8	ASI	Tareq Mubarak Taher	8:03.70
9	GRE	Anastasios Fraggos	8:17.30

==== Women ====
Rank	Team	Competitor	Result
1	AFR	Tirunesh Dibaba	8:33.78 CR
2	POL	Lidia Chojecka	8:39.69
3	USA	Kara Goucher	8:41.42 PB
4	OCE	Eloise Wellings	8:41.78 PB
5	ASI	Kayoko Fukushi	8:44.58 SB
6	EUR	Krisztina Papp	8:51.15
7	RUS	Yuliya Chizhenko	8:59.67 SB
8	GRE	Maria Protopappa	9:00.15 SB
9	AME	Megan Metcalfe	9:04.90

=== 5000 m ===
==== Men ====
Rank	Team	Competitor	Result
1	ASI	Saif Saaeed Shaheen	13:35.30
2	AFR	Mike Kipruto Kigen	13:36.19
3	USA	Matthew Tegenkamp	13:36.83
4	EUR	Jan Fitschen	13:45.38
5	AME	Marilson dos Santos	13:47.15
6	FRA	Khalid Zoubaa	13:49.44
7	RUS	Sergey Ivanov	13:50.16
8	OCE	Adrian Blincoe	14:03.29
9	GRE	Padeleimon Savvopoulos	14:26.62

==== Women ====
Rank	Team	Competitor	Result
1	AFR	Meseret Defar	14:39.11 CR
2	RUS	Liliya Shobukhova	15:05.33
3	ASI	Kayoko Fukushi	15:06.69
4	OCE	Kimberley Smith	15:12.15
5	USA	Lauren Fleshman	15:17.65
6	EUR	Sabrina Mockenhaupt	15:34.61
7	GRE	Maria Protopappa	15:49.50
8	POL	Katarzyna Kowalska	16:18.35
9	AME	Lucélia Peres	16:23.72

=== 3000 m steeplechase ===
==== Men ====
Rank	Team	Competitor	Result
1	ASI	Saif Saaeed Shaheen	8:19.09 CR
2	AFR	Paul Kipsiele Koech	8:19.37
3	FRA	Bouabdellah Tahri	8:29.06
4	EUR	Jukka Keskisalo	8:29.42
5	OCE	Youcef Abdi	8:36.13
6	RUS	Pavel Potapovich	8:38.95
7	USA	Steve Slattery	8:43.15
8	AME	Fernando Alex Fernandes	8:51.33
9	GRE	Arbedo-Alexandros Litsis	9:10.83

==== Women ====
Rank	Team	Competitor	Result
1	EUR	Alesia Turava	9:29.10
2	AFR	Jeruto Kiptum	9:31.44
3	POL	Wioletta Janowska	9:35.08
4	OCE	Victoria Mitchell	9:36.34
5	RUS	Tatyana Petrova	9:36.50
6	AME	Korene Hinds	9:47.86
7	USA	Lisa Galaviz	9:49.32
8	ASI	Minori Hayakari	9:49.49
9	GRE	Irini Kokkinariou	10:35.78

=== 100/110 m hurdles ===
==== Men (110 m) ====
Rank	Team	Competitor	Result
1	USA	Allen Johnson	12.96 CR
2	ASI	Liu Xiang	13.03
3	AME	Dayron Robles	13.06
4	EUR	Staņislavs Olijars	13.15 SB
5	FRA	Cédric Lavanne	13.56
6	RUS	Igor Peremota	13.57
7	OCE	James Mortimer	13.94
8	GRE	Theopistos Mavridis	13.96
9	AFR	Aymen Ben Ahmed	14.08

==== Women (100 m) ====
Rank	Team	Competitor	Result
1	AME	Brigitte Foster-Hylton	12.67
2	EUR	Susanna Kallur	12.77
3	USA	Ginnie Powell	12.90
4	OCE	Sally McLellan	12.95 PB
5	POL	Aurelia Trywiańska	12.97
6	RUS	Aleksandra Antonova	13.12
7	GRE	Flora Redoumi	13.23
8	AFR	Toyin Augustus	13.27
9	ASI	Feng Yun	13.32

=== 400 m hurdles ===
==== Men ====
Rank	Team	Competitor	Result
1	USA	Kerron Clement	48.12
2	AFR	L. J. van Zyl	48.35
3	EUR	Marek Plawgo	48.76
4	AME	Kemel Thompson	48.80
5	FRA	Naman Keïta	49.53
6	RUS	Aleksandr Derevjagin	49.83
7	OCE	Tristan Thomas	50.00
8	GRE	Minas Alozidis	51.12
9	ASI	Yevgeniy Meleshenko	51.55

==== Women ====
Rank	Team	Competitor	Result
1	RUS	Yuliya Nosova	53.88
2	USA	Lashinda Demus	54.06
3	POL	Anna Jesień	54.48 SB
4	EUR	Tetiana Tereschuk-Antipova	54.55
5	AME	Daimí Pernía	54.60 SB
6	ASI	Xiaoxiao Huang	55.06 SB
7	AFR	Janet Wienand	56.31
8	GRE	Hristina Hantzi-Neag	56.35 SB
9	OCE	Lauren Boden	58.22

=== 4 × 100 m relay ===
==== Men ====
Rank	Team	Competitor	Result
1	USA	Kaaron Conwright, Wallace Spearmon, Tyson Gay, Jason Smoots	37.59 CR
2	EUR	Dwain Chambers, Dwayne Grant, Marlon Devonish, Mark Lewis-Francis	38.45 PB
3	ASI	Naoki Tsukahara, Shingo Suetsugu, Shinji Takahira, Shigeyuki Kojima	38.51 PB
4	RUS	Maksim Mokrousov, Mikhail Yegorychev, Roman Smirnov, Andrey Yepishin	38.78 SB
5	AFR	Adetoyi Durotoye, Uchenna Emedolu, Stéphan Buckland, Eric Nkansah	38.87 SB
6	OCE	Daniel Batman, Patrick Johnson, Ambrose Ezenwa, Aaron Rouge-Serret	39.48 SB
7	FRA	Oudéré Kankarafou, Dimitri Demoniere, Fabrice Calligny, Issa-Aimé Nthépé	39.67
8	GRE	Ioannis Politis, Andreas Karayiannis, Aristidis Petridis, Panayiotis Sarris	39.84
	AME	Dwight Thomas, Marc Burns, Christopher Williams, Asafa Powell	DNF

==== Women ====
Rank	Team	Competitor	Result
1	AME	Aleen Bailey, Debbie Ferguson, Cydonie Mothersille, Sherone Simpson	42.26 WL
2	RUS	Yuliya Gushchina, Natalya Rusakova, Irina Khabarova, Yekaterina Grigoryeva	42.36 SB
3	AFR	Francisca Idoko, Endurance Ojokolo, Esther Dankwah, Vida Anim	43.61 SB
4	POL	Ewelina Klocek, Daria Onyśko, Dorota Dydo, Beata Szkudlarz	43.91 SB
5	OCE	Preya Carey, Sally McLellan, Melanie Kleeberg, Fiona Cullen	44.26 SB
6	ASI	Sangwan Jaksunin, Oranut Klomdee, Jutamass Thavoncharoen, Nongnuch Sanrat	44.27 SB
7	GRE	Hariklia Bouda, Zoi Nerantzidou, Eleftheria Kobidou, Yeoryia Kokloni	44.29
8	EUR	Anyika Onuora, Emma Ania, Emily Freeman, Joice Maduaka	47.61 SB
	USA	Wyllesheia Myrick, Stephanie Durst, Me'Lisa Barber, Torri Edwards	DQ

=== 4 × 400 m relay ===
==== Men ====
Rank	Team	Competitor	Result
1	USA	Jamel Ashley, Derrick Brew, LaShawn Merritt, Darold Williamson	3:00.11
2	AME	Chris Brown, Michael Blackwood, Carlos Santa, Alleyne Francique	3:00.14 SB
3	AFR	Paul Gorries, Gary Kikaya, Young Talkmore Nyongani, Malik Louahla	3:00.88 PB
4	FRA	Brice Panel, Leslie Djhone, Naman Keïta, Marc Raquil	3:03.85
5	EUR	Rafał Wieruszewski, Kamghe Gaba, Daniel Dąbrowski, Andrea Barberi	3:03.90 PB
6	RUS	Dmitriy Petrov, Vladislav Frolov, Aleksandr Derevyagin, Yevgeniy Lebedev	3:04.15
7	ASI	Prasanna Sampath Amarasekara, Yuzo Kanemaru, Hamed Hamadan Al-Bishi, Mohammed Al Salhi	3:04.67 SB
8	OCE	Tristan Thomas, Daniel Batman, Clinton Hill, Sean Wroe	3:05.54 SB
9	GRE	Stilianos Dimotsios, Padeleimon Melahrinoudis, Yeoryios Doupis, Dimitrios Regas	3:09.68

==== Women ====
Rank	Team	Competitor	Result
1	AME	Shericka Williams, Tonique Williams-Darling, Christine Amertil, Novlene Williams	3:19.84 WL
2	USA	DeeDee Trotter, Monique Henderson, Moushaumi Robinson, Lashinda Demus	3:20.69 SB
3	RUS	Svetlana Pospelova, Olga Kotlyarova, Yulia Nosova, Tatyana Veshkurova	3:21.21 SB
4	EUR	Mariyana Dimitrova, Nataliya Pyhyda, Ilona Usovich, Vania Stambolova	3:22.35 PB
5	POL	Grażyna Prokopek, Monika Bejnar, Aneta Lemiesz, Anna Jesień	3:27.22
6	AFR	Amy Mbacké Thiam, Louise Ayétotché, Amantle Montsho, Christy Ekpukhon	3:27.65 SB
7	GRE	Hristina Hantzi-Neag, Stiliani Dimoglou, Alena-Maria Padi, Dimitra Dova	3:35.79
8	OCE	Rosemary Hayward, Caitlin Willis, Angeline Blackburn, Rebecca Irwin	3:36.36 SB
9	ASI	Asami Tanno, Chitra K. Soman, Sathi Geetha, Manjeet Kaur	3:38.85 SB

== Field ==
Events
High jump	Pole vault	Long jump	Triple jump	Shot put	Discus	Hammer	Javelin

=== High jump ===
==== Men ====
Rank	Team	Competitor	Result
1	EUR	Tomáš Janku	2.28
2	RUS	Andrei Silnov	2.24
3	USA	Tora Harris	2.24
4	AFR	Kabelo Kgosiemang	2.20
5	GRE	Dimitrios Sirrakos	2.20
6	AME	Jessé de Lima	2.15
7	FRA	Mustapha Raifak	2.10
8	OCE	Liam Zamel-Paez	2.05
	ASI	Haiqiang Huang	DNS

==== Women ====
Rank	Team	Competitor	Result
1	RUS	Jelena Slesarenko	1.97
2	EUR	Tia Hellebaut	1.97
3	ASI	Marina Aitova	1.94 PB
3	USA	Amy Acuff	1.94
5	AME	Nicole Forrester	1.94 PB
6	POL	Anna Ksok	1.87
7	GRE	Persefoni Hatzinakou	1.83
7	AFR	Rene van der Merwe	1.83
9	OCE	Angela McKee	1.79

=== Pole vault ===
==== Men ====
Rank	Team	Competitor	Result
1	OCE	Steven Hooker	5.80
2	ASI	Daichi Sawano	5.70
3	AME	Germán Chiaraviglio	5.70
4	FRA	Romain Mesnil	5.60
5	USA	Russ Buller	5.50
6	AFR	Okkert Brits	5.50
7	EUR	Aleksandr Averbukh	5.50
8	GRE	Stavros Kouroupakis	5.40
9	RUS	Dmitry Starodubtsev	5.20

==== Women ====
Rank	Team	Competitor	Result
1	RUS	Yelena Isinbayeva	4.60 CR
2	AME	Fabiana Murer	4.55
3	ASI	Gao Shuying	4.50 SB
4	EUR	Martina Strutz	4.40
5	POL	Monika Pyrek	4.30
6	GRE	Afroditi Skafida	4.15
7	AFR	Syrine Balti	4.00
	USA	Jennifer Stuczynski	NM
	OCE	Kym Howe	NM

=== Long jump ===
==== Men ====
Rank	Team	Competitor	Result
1	AME	Irving Saladino	8.26
2	EUR	Andrew Howe	8.12
3	ASI	Mohamed Salman Al-Khuwalidi	8.11
4	AFR	Ignisious Gaisah	8.09
5	FRA	Salim Sdiri	8.03
6	USA	Brian Johnson	7.88
7	RUS	Ruslan Gataullin	7.64
8	OCE	Fabrice Lapierre	7.58
	GRE	Louis Tsatoumas	NM

==== Women ====
Rank	Team	Competitor	Result
1	RUS	Lyudmila Kolchanova	6.78
2	EUR	Naide Gomes	6.68
3	GRE	Hrysopiyi Devetzi	6.64
4	OCE	Bronwyn Thompson	6.63
5	POL	Małgorzata Trybańska	6.41
6	USA	Rose Richmond	6.38
7	AME	Keila Costa	6.33
8	ASI	Olga Rypakova	6.21
9	AFR	Joséphine Mbarga-Bikié	5.87

=== Triple jump ===
==== Men ====
Rank	Team	Competitor	Result
1	USA	Walter Davis	17.54
2	AME	Jadel Gregório	17.41
3	EUR	Marian Oprea	17.05
4	ASI	Yanxi Li	16.87
5	RUS	Danil Burkenya	16.84
6	AFR	Tarik Bougtaïb	16.57
7	FRA	Julien Kapek	16.56
8	OCE	Alwyn Jones	16.42
	GRE	Konstadinos Zalaggitis	NM

==== Women ====
Rank	Team	Competitor	Result
1	RUS	Tatyana Lebedeva	15.13
2	GRE	Hrysopiyi Devetzi	15.04
3	AFR	Yamilé Aldama	14.78
4	AME	Trecia Smith	14.64
5	ASI	Anastasiya Juravleva	14.54
6	EUR	Olha Saladukha	14.16
7	USA	Shani Marks	13.79
8	POL	Aleksandra Fila	13.34
9	OCE	Linda Allen	12.95

=== Shot put ===
==== Men ====
Rank	Team	Competitor	Result
1	EUR	Ralf Bartels	20.67
2	USA	Reese Hoffa	20.60
3	RUS	Pavel Sofin	20.45
4	OCE	Scott Martin	20.25
5	AME	Dorian Scott	20.21
6	FRA	Gaëtan Bucki	19.40
7	ASI	Navpreet Singh	18.43
8	AFR	Yasser Ibrahim Farag	18.23
9	GRE	Andreas Anastasopoulos	17.06

==== Women ====
Rank	Team	Competitor	Result
1	OCE	Valerie Vili	19.87
2	RUS	Olga Ryabinkina	19.54 SB
3	AME	Yumileidi Cumbá	19.12
4	EUR	Natallia Kharaneka	19.06
5	ASI	Li Ling	19.05 PB
6	USA	Jillian Camarena	18.43
7	POL	Krystyna Zabawska	17.74
8	AFR	Vivian Chukwuemeka	17.72
9	GRE	Irini Terzoglou	16.32

=== Discus ===
==== Men ====
Rank	Team	Competitor	Result
1	EUR	Virgilijus Alekna	67.19
2	ASI	Ehsan Haddadi	62.60
3	USA	Ian Waltz	62.12
4	AFR	Omar Ahmed El Ghazaly	61.50
5	OCE	Scott Martin	60.93
6	FRA	Jean-Claude Retel	58.18
7	RUS	Bogdan Pishchalnikov	58.17
8	GRE	Stefanos Konstas	58.17
9	AME	Jason Tunks	56.92

==== Women ====
Rank	Team	Competitor	Result
1	EUR	Franka Dietzsch	66.07
2	USA	Aretha Thurmond	61.83
3	ASI	Aimin Song	61.47
4	RUS	Darya Pishchalnikova	61.39
5	POL	Wioletta Potępa	60.82
6	OCE	Dani Samuels	59.68
7	AME	Yania Ferrales	58.93
8	AFR	Elizna Naude	56.11
9	GRE	Areti Abatzi	53.66

=== Hammer ===
==== Men ====
Rank	Team	Competitor	Result
1	ASI	Koji Murofushi	82.01 SB
2	EUR	Ivan Tikhon	80.00
3	RUS	Ilya Konovalov	77.14
4	USA	Alfred Kruger	75.53
5	GRE	Alexandros Papadimitriou	74.13
6	AME	James Steacy	74.04
7	AFR	Chris Harmse	73.94
8	OCE	Stuart Rendell	71.99
9	FRA	Christophe Épalle	71.43

==== Women ====
Rank	Team	Competitor	Result
1	POL	Kamila Skolimowska	75.29 CR
2	RUS	Tatyana Lysenko	74.44
3	AME	Yipsi Moreno	73.99
4	ASI	Zhang Wenxiu	71.19
5	EUR	Maryia Smaliachkova	68.93
6	USA	Erin Gilreath	67.39
7	OCE	Brooke Krueger-Billett	65.92
8	GRE	Alexandra Papayeoryiou	65.22
9	AFR	Marwa Hussein	60.23

=== Javelin ===
==== Men ====
Rank	Team	Competitor	Result
1	EUR	Andreas Thorkildsen	87.17
2	AFR	Gerhardus Pienaar	83.62
3	RUS	Aleksandr Ivanov	81.87
4	ASI	Chen Qi	79.20
5	GRE	Yeóryios Íltsios	75.74
6	OCE	Stuart Farquhar	74.55
7	USA	Rob Minnitti	73.40
8	FRA	Bérenger Demerval	67.68
9	AME	Robinson Pratt	29.02 PB

==== Women ====
Rank	Team	Competitor	Result
1	EUR	Steffi Nerius	63.37
2	AME	Sonia Bisset	61.74
3	AFR	Justine Robbeson	61.38
4	POL	Barbara Madejczyk	59.63
5	OCE	Kimberley Mickle	58.52
6	GRE	Savva Lika	58.36
7	RUS	Lada Chernova	58.29
8	USA	Kim Kreiner	54.34
9	ASI	Ma Ning	52.54
