= 2006 European Cup (athletics) =

- Logo of the 2006 Superleague
- Host city: Málaga, Spain (Super League)
- Dates: 28–29 June 2006
- Main venue: Estadio Ciudad de Málaga (Super League)

The 2006 Spar European Cup (the 27th) took place in Málaga, Spain and attracted over 2000 athletes from 49 countries. The mascot for the 2006 games was "Manolito" the Octopus, it was chosen from the drawings submitted in a contest aimed at Andalusian schoolchildren, the winner was Eva Simancas Rubio, aged 11 from ‘Julio Caro Baroja’. The top two teams for both men and women qualified for the 2006 IAAF World Cup.

== Super League ==
=== Stadium ===
The Athletics Stadium Ciudad de Málaga is located in the city's western area, and is easily accessible by road, not far from the airport and in front of the 'José María Martín Carpena' Sports Hall. It also has 9 lanes on the track which allows a 9th team to be able to compete.

=== Team standings ===
Men

Pos	Country	Pts
1	France	118
2	Russia	116
3	Great Britain	109
4	Poland	107
5	Ukraine	103
6	Spain	99.5
7	Italy	93
8	Germany	86.5
9	Finland	65

- Finland, Italy & Spain relegated, Germany saved as they were to host the 2007 competition.
- Belgium & Greece both promoted to the Superleague for 2007 from League 1.

Women

Pos	Country	Pts
1	Russia	155
2	Poland	115.5
3	Ukraine	99
4	France	98
5	Germany	93
6	Spain	90
7	Great Britain	85
8	Sweden	81
9	Romania	76.5

- Great Britain & NI, Sweden & Romania all relegated to League 1.
- Belarus & Greece, both promoted from League 1 for the 2007 cup.

Relegation to 1st League

=== Results summary ===
==== Men's events ====
Event	Gold		Silver		Bronze	
100 m (Wind: +2.6 m/s)	Ronald Pognon; France	10.13w	Dwain Chambers; Great Britain	10.19w	Andrey Yepishin; Russia	10.19w
200 m (Wind: +1.8 m/s)	Christian Malcolm; Great Britain	20.29	Ronald Pognon; France	20.37	Marcin Urbaś; Poland	20.55
400 m	Marc Raquil; France	45.89	Vladislav Frolov; Russia	46.13	Daniel Dąbrowski; Poland	46.37
800 m	Juan de Dios Jurado; Spain	1:46.00	Ivan Heshko; Ukraine	1:46.24	Florent Lacasse; France	1:46.44
1500 m	Ivan Heshko; Ukraine	3:50.34	Juan Carlos Higuero; Spain	3:50.85	Aleksandr Krivchonkov; Russia	3:51.96
3000 m	Sergio Gallardo; Spain	8:27.78	Mo Farah; Great Britain	8:27.91	Driss Maazouzi; France	8:28.64
5000 m	Sergey Lebid; Ukraine	14:16.83	Juan Carlos de la Ossa; Spain	14:17.65	Sergey Ivanov; Russia	14:18.14
3000 m steeplechase	Antonio Jiménez; Spain	8:25.59	Vincent Le Dauphin; France	8:28.77	Jukka Keskisalo; Finland	8:30.45
110 m hurdles (Wind: -1.5 m/s)	Ladji Doucouré; France	13.27	Andy Turner; Great Britain	13.47	Igor Peremota; Russia	13.50
400 m hurdles	Naman Keïta; France	50.20	Aleksandr Derevyagin; Russia	50.35	Gianni Carabelli; Italy	50.45
4 × 100 m	Poland; Dariusz Kuć; Łukasz Chyła; Marcin Jędrusiński; Marcin Urbaś	39.07	Italy; Luca Verdecchia; Stefano Anceschi; Massimiliano Donati; Francesco Scuderi	39.14	Great Britain; Tim Abeyie; Marlon Devonish; Christian Malcolm; Harry Aikines-Aryeetey	39.31
4 × 400 m	France; Leslie Djhone; Brice Panel; Naman Keïta; Marc Raquil	3:03.59	Poland; Rafał Wieruszewski; Piotr Klimczak; Marcin Marciniszyn; Daniel Dąbrowski	3:03.86	Italy; Andrew Howe; Gianni Carabelli; Luca Galletti; Andrea Barberi	3:04.27
High jump	Andrey Silnov; Russia	2.31	Giulio Ciotti; Italy	2.29	Germaine Mason; Great Britain	2.27
Pole vault	Romain Mesnil; France	5.70	Giuseppe Gibilisco; Italy	5.65	Mikko Latvala; Finland	5.45
Long jump	Andrew Howe; Italy	8.29	Salim Sdiri; France	8.15	Marcin Starzak; Poland	8.09
Triple jump	Fabrizio Donato; Italy	16.99	Viktor Yastrebov; Ukraine	16.91	Julien Kapek; France	16.80
Shot put	Pavel Sofin; Russia	20.59	Manuel Martínez; Spain	20.58	Ralf Bartels; Germany	20.43
Discus throw	Piotr Małachowski; Poland	66.21	Lars Riedel; Germany	63.47	Mario Pestano; Spain	62.35
Hammer throw	Szymon Ziółkowski; Poland	79.31	Andrey Skvaruk; Ukraine	78.71	Olli-Pekka Karjalainen; Finland	77.08
Javelin throw	Tero Pitkämäki; Finland	85.30	Sergey Makarov; Russia	82.43	Igor Janik; Poland	79.30
WR world record | AR area record | CR championship record | GR games record | NR national record | OR Olympic record | PB personal best | SB season best | WL world leading (in a given season)

==== Women's events ====
Event	Gold		Silver		Bronze	
100 m (Wind: +2.4 m/s)	Yuliya Gushchina; Russia	11.13w	Joice Maduaka; Great Britain	11.29w	Fabienne Beret-Martinel; France	11.35w
200 m (Wind: +0.6 m/s)	Olga Zaytseva; Russia	22.73	Angela Moroșanu; Romania	22.91	Monika Bejnar; Poland	22.97
400 m	Svetlana Pospelova; Russia	50.77	Nicola Sanders; Great Britain	51.92	Claudia Hoffmann; Germany	52.81
800 m	Svetlana Klyuka; Russia	2:01.99	Monika Gradzki; Germany	2:04.13	Mayte Martínez; Spain	2:04.16
1500 m	Yuliya Chizhenko; Russia	4:14.39	Latifa Essarokh; France	4:14.76	Natalya Tobias; Ukraine	4:15.36
3000 m	Joanne Pavey; Great Britain	8:52.54	Olesya Syreva; Russia	8:58.27	Justyna Lesman; Poland	9:02.64
5000 m	Liliya Shobukhova; Russia	16:18.23	Marta Domínguez; Spain	16:25.21	Natalya Berkut; Ukraine	16:26.12
3000 m steeplechase	Yelena Sidorchenkova; Russia	9:45.73	Rosa María Morató; Spain	9:49.81	Katarzyna Kowalska; Poland	9:56.10
100 m hurdles (Wind: +0.8 m/s)	Susanna Kallur; Sweden	12.69	Kirsten Bolm; Germany	12.74	Adrianna Lamalle; France	12.90
400 m hurdles	Natasha Danvers-Smith; Great Britain	55.65	Yevgeniya Isakova; Russia	55.82	Tatyana Tereshchuk; Ukraine	55.87
4 × 100 m	Russia; Natalya Rusakova; Yuliya Gushchina; Yekaterina Kondratyeva; Larisa Kruglova	43.71	France; Adrianna Lamalle; Fabienne Beret-Martinel; Céline Distel; Carima Louami	43.75	Ukraine; Olena Chebanu; Olena Sinyavina; Iryna Shtanhyeyeva; Oksana Shcherbak	43.86
4 × 400 m	Russia; Yelena Migunova; Olga Zaytseva; Tatyana Veshkurova; Natalya Antyukh	3:23.51	Poland; Zuzanna Radecka; Monika Bejnar; Małgorzata Pskit; Grażyna Prokopek	3:26.60	Great Britain; Helen Karagounis; Nicola Sanders; Melanie Purkiss; Lee McConnell	3:26.98
High jump	Kajsa Bergqvist; Sweden	1.97	Ruth Beitia; Spain	1.95	Anna Chicherova; Russia	1.92
Pole vault	Monika Pyrek; Poland	4.75; CR	Vanessa Boslak; France	4.70	Nastja Ryshich; Germany	4.55
Long jump	Tatyana Kotova; Russia	6.67	Eunice Barber; France	6.61	Daniela Lincoln-Saavedra; Sweden	6.55
Triple jump	Olga Saladukha; Ukraine	14.10	Viktoriya Gurova; Russia	14.06	Adelina Gavrilă; Romania	14.00
Shot put	Petra Lammert; Germany	19.36	Irina Khudoroshkina; Russia	18.29	Krystyna Zabawska; Poland	17.78
Discus throw	Franka Dietzsch; Germany	65.54	Darya Pishchalnikova; Russia	64.24	Nicoleta Grasu; Romania	61.91
Hammer throw	Tatyana Lysenko; Russia	76.50; CR	Kamila Skolimowska; Poland	68.16	Irina Sekachova; Ukraine	67.96
Javelin throw	Barbara Madejczyk; Poland	64.08	Felicia Moldovan; Romania	60.49	Mercedes Chilla; Spain	60.22
WR world record | AR area record | CR championship record | GR games record | NR national record | OR Olympic record | PB personal best | SB season best | WL world leading (in a given season)

== First League ==
The First League was held on 17 and 18 June

=== Men ===
Group A
Held in Prague, Czech Republic

Pos.	Nation	Points
1	Belgium	120
2	Sweden	115
3	Czech Republic	104
4	Belarus	88
5	Switzerland	79
6	Estonia	78
7	Norway	72
8	Austria	63

Group B
Held in Thessaloniki, Greece

Pos.	Nation	Points
1	Greece	122
2	Netherlands	108
3	Portugal	102
4	Romania	102
5	Slovenia	83
6	Hungary	80
7	Croatia	62
8	Turkey	56

=== Women ===
Group A
Held in Prague, Czech Republic

Pos.	Nation	Points
1	Belarus	126.5
2	Italy	107
3	Czech Republic	91
4	Ireland	84
5	Finland	80
6	Belgium	79
7	Switzerland	77
8	Latvia	76

Group B
Held in Thessaloniki, Greece

Pos.	Nation	Points
1	Greece	136
2	Bulgaria	109
3	Netherlands	100
4	Portugal	98.5
5	Slovenia	85
6	Hungary	81
7	Turkey	67.5
8	Lithuania	42

== Second League ==
The Second League was held on 17 and 18 June

=== Men ===
Group A
Held in Banská Bystrica, Slovakia

Pos.	Nation	Points
1	Slovakia	129.5
2	Ireland	109
3	Israel	108
4	Denmark	108
5	Latvia	80
6	Moldova	75.5
7	Iceland	67
8	Andorra	40

Group B
Held in Novi Sad, Serbia

Pos.	Nation	Points
1	Serbia and Montenegro (Note: Dissolved on 3 June 2006 with Montenegro's independence, but still competed together at this event. For 2007, Serbia took Serbia and Montenegro's spot from the First League, while Montenegro was placed in the Second League.)	199
2	Bulgaria	190
3	Lithuania	183
4	Cyprus	177
5	Luxembourg	141
6	Azerbaijan	130
4	Bosnia and Herzegovina	128
5	Georgia	98
6	Armenia	91
7	Albania	87
8	Macedonia	47
9	AASSE	43

=== Women ===
Group A
Held in Banská Bystrica, Slovakia

Pos.	Nation	Points
1	Norway	124
2	Slovakia	120
3	Croatia	117
4	Israel	88
5	Denmark	87
6	Moldova	86.5
7	Iceland	68.5
8	Andorra	26

Group B
Held in Novi Sad, Serbia

Pos.	Nation	Points
1	Cyprus	186.5
2	Serbia and Montenegro	179
3	Austria	176.5
4	Estonia	174
5	Bosnia and Herzegovina	108.5
6	AASSE	106
7	Georgia	80.5
8	Albania	80
9	Armenia	79
10	Azerbaijan	72
11	Macedonia	49
