= 2003 European Athletics U23 Championships – Men's 400 metres =

The men's 400 metres event at the 2003 European Athletics U23 Championships was held in Bydgoszcz, Poland, at Zawisza Stadion on 17 and 20 July.

== Medalists ==
Gold	Leslie Djhone; France
Silver	Timothy Benjamin; Great Britain
Bronze	Rafał Wieruszewski; Poland

== Results ==
=== Final ===
19 July

Rank	Name	Nationality	Time	Notes
1st place, gold medalist(s)	Leslie Djhone	France	45.04	CR
2nd place, silver medalist(s)	Timothy Benjamin	Great Britain	45.86	
3rd place, bronze medalist(s)	Rafał Wieruszewski	Poland	45.87	
4	Aliaksandr Yelistratau	Belarus	46.11	
5	Volodymyr Demchenko	Ukraine	46.14	
6	David McCarthy	Ireland	46.26	
7	Bastian Swillims	Germany	46.91	
8	Xavier de Baerdemaeker	Belgium	47.56	

=== Heats ===
18 July
Qualified: first 2 in each heat and 2 best to the Final

==== Heat 1 ====
Rank	Name	Nationality	Time	Notes
1	Leslie Djhone	France	45.54	Q
2	David McCarthy	Ireland	46.05	Q
3	Sebastian Gatzka	Germany	46.70	
4	Daniel Dąbrowski	Poland	47.11	
5	Dmitriy Petrov	Russia	47.13	
6	Allan Stuart	Great Britain	47.23	
7	Myhaylo Knysh	Ukraine	47.53	
8	Nikolai Portelli	Malta	48.77	

==== Heat 2 ====
Rank	Name	Nationality	Time	Notes
1	Volodymyr Demchenko	Ukraine	46.05	Q
2	Aliaksandr Yelistratau	Belarus	46.21	Q
3	Xavier de Baerdemaeker	Belgium	46.37	q
4	Kacper Skalski	Poland	46.69	
5	Andrey Polukeyev	Russia	46.74	
6	Stefano Aguzzi	Italy	47.03	
7	Nicolas Lefebvre	France	47.19	
8	David Gillick	Ireland	47.67	

==== Heat 3 ====
Rank	Name	Nationality	Time	Notes
1	Timothy Benjamin	Great Britain	45.71	Q
2	Rafał Wieruszewski	Poland	45.90	Q
3	Bastian Swillims	Germany	46.26	q
4	Dmitrijs Milkevics	Latvia	46.44	
5	Jan Mazanec	Czech Republic	46.62	
6	Daniel Ruiz	Spain	47.31	
7	Brice Panel	France	47.33	
8	Thomas Nikitin	Sweden	47.47	

== Participation ==
According to an unofficial count, 24 athletes from 15 countries participated in the event.

- Belarus (1)
- Belgium (1)
- Czech Republic (1)
- France (3)
- Germany (2)
- Great Britain (2)
- Ireland (2)
- Italy (1)
- Latvia (1)
- Malta (1)
- Poland (3)
- Russia (2)
- Spain (1)
- Sweden (1)
- Ukraine (2)
