= 2003 European Athletics U23 Championships – Men's 4 × 400 metres relay =

The men's 4 x 400 metres relay event at the 2003 European Athletics U23 Championships was held in Bydgoszcz, Poland, at Zawisza Stadion on 20 July.

== Medalists ==
Gold	Rafał Wieruszewski; Kacper Skalski; Daniel Dąbrowski; Marek Plawgo; Poland
Silver	Sebastian Gatzka; Christian Duma; Steffen Sattelmaier; Bastian Swillims; Germany
Bronze	Roman Matveyev; Dmitriy Petrov; Aleksandr Borshchenko; Amdrey Polukeyev; Russia

== Results ==
=== Final ===
20 July

Rank	Nation	Competitors	Time	Notes
1st place, gold medalist(s)	Poland	Rafał Wieruszewski; Kacper Skalski; Daniel Dąbrowski; Marek Plawgo	3:03.32	
2nd place, silver medalist(s)	Germany	Sebastian Gatzka; Christian Duma; Steffen Sattelmaier; Bastian Swillims	3:03.36	
3rd place, bronze medalist(s)	Russia	Roman Matveyev; Dmitriy Petrov; Aleksandr Borshchenko; Amdrey Polukeyev	3:04.18	
4	Netherlands	Youssef El Rhalfioui; Peter Wolters; Jelle Heisen; Robert Lathouwers	3:06.61	
5	France	Grégory Kiavue; Sébastien Maillard; Brice Panel; Nicolas Lefebvre	3:06.79	
6	United Kingdom	Allan Stuart; David Brackstone; Robert Tobin; Timothy Benjamin	3:06.79	
7	Belarus	Yauheni Mikheika; Sergey Nesterov; Maksim Sidorenko; Aleksandr Yelistratov	3:08.98	
	Spain	David Melo; Daniel Ruiz; Jairo Vera; Marcos Muñoz	DNF	

== Participation ==
According to an unofficial count, 32 athletes from 8 countries participated in the event.

- Belarus (4)
- France (4)
- Germany (4)
- Netherlands (4)
- Poland (4)
- Russia (4)
- Spain (4)
- United Kingdom (4)
