= 2007 World Championships in Athletics – Men's 4 × 400 metres relay =

The men's 4 × 400 metres relay at the 2007 World Championships in Athletics was held at the Nagai Stadium on 1 and 2 September.

== Medalists ==
Gold	Silver	Bronze
United States; LaShawn Merritt; Angelo Taylor; Darold Williamson; Jeremy Wariner; Bershawn Jackson*; Kerron Clement*	Bahamas; Avard Moncur; Michael Mathieu; Andrae Williams; Chris Brown; Nathaniel McKinney*	Poland; Marek Plawgo; Daniel Dąbrowski; Marcin Marciniszyn; Kacper Kozłowski; Rafał Wieruszewski*; Witold Bańka*

* Runners who participated in the heats only and received medals.

== Records ==
Prior to the competition, the following records were as follows.

World record	United States (USA); Andrew Valmon, Quincy Watts, Butch Reynolds, Michael Johnson	2:54.29	Stuttgart, Germany	22 August 1993
Championship record	United States (USA); Andrew Valmon, Quincy Watts, Butch Reynolds, Michael Johnson	2:54.29	Stuttgart, Germany	22 August 1993

== Schedule ==
Date	Time	Round
September 1, 2007	21:00	Heats
September 2, 2007	20:50	Final

== Results ==
=== Heats ===
Qualification: First 3 of each heat (Q) plus the 2 fastest times (q) advance to the final.

Rank	Heat	Nation	Athletes	Time	Notes
1	1	Bahamas	Nathaniel McKinney, Michael Mathieu, Chris Brown, Andrae Williams	3:00.37	Q, SB
2	1	Jamaica	Michael Blackwood, Ricardo Chambers, Leford Green, Sanjay Ayre	3:00.99	Q
3	1	Russia	Maksim Dyldin, Vladislav Frolov, Konstantin Svechkar, Denis Alekseyev	3:01.07	Q, SB
4	1	Great Britain	Andrew Steele, Robert Tobin, Richard Buck, Martyn Rooney	3:01.22	q, SB
5	2	United States	Bershawn Jackson, Kerron Clement, Darold Williamson, Angelo Taylor	3:01.46	Q
6	2	Germany	Ingo Schultz, Kamghe Gaba, Simon Kirch, Bastian Swillims	3:02.21	Q
7	2	Poland	Rafał Wieruszewski, Witold Bańka, Marcin Marciniszyn, Daniel Dąbrowski	3:02.39	Q
8	1	Dominican Republic	Carlos Santa, Arismendy Peguero, Yoel Tapia, Félix Sánchez	3:02.49	q
9	1	Australia	Sean Wroe, Dylan Grant, Kurt Mulcahy, Mark Ormrod	3:02.59	SB
10	2	Japan	Yuki Yamaguchi, Yusuke Ishitsuka, Kenji Narisako, Mitsuhiro Sato	3:02.76	
11	2	Trinidad and Tobago	Ato Modibo, Jovon Toppin, Jarrin Solomon, Renny Quow	3:02.92	SB
12	1	France	Mathieu Lahaye, Brice Panel, Fadil Bellaabouss, Leslie Djhone	3:04.45	
13	2	Greece	Dimitrios Regas, Yeóryios Doúpis, Dimitrios Gravalos, Periklis Iakovakis	3:05.65	
14	2	Botswana	Isaac Makwala, Obakeng Ngwigwa, Kamberuka Sakaria, California Molefe	3:05.96	
15	1	Nigeria	Bolaji Lawal, James Godday, Victor Isaiah, Saul Weigopwa	3:06.04	

=== Final ===
Rank	Nation	Athletes	Time	Notes
1st place, gold medalist(s)	United States	LaShawn Merritt, Angelo Taylor, Darold Williamson, Jeremy Wariner	2:55.56	WL
2nd place, silver medalist(s)	Bahamas	Avard Moncur, Michael Mathieu, Andrae Williams, Chris Brown	2:59.18	SB
3rd place, bronze medalist(s)	Poland	Marek Plawgo, Daniel Dąbrowski, Marcin Marciniszyn, Kacper Kozłowski	3:00.05	SB
4	Jamaica	Michael Blackwood, Ricardo Chambers, Leford Green, Sanjay Ayre	3:00.76	
5	Russia	Maksim Dyldin, Vladislav Frolov, Konstantin Svechkar, Denis Alekseyev	3:01.62	
6	Great Britain	Andrew Steele, Robert Tobin, Richard Buck, Martyn Rooney	3:02.94	
7	Dominican Republic	Félix Sánchez, Yoel Tapia, Carlos Santa, Arismendy Peguero	3:03.56	
8	Germany	Ingo Schultz, Simon Kirch, Kamghe Gaba, Bastian Swillims	3:07.40	
