= 2007 World Championships in Athletics – Men's 400 metres =

The men's 400 metres at the 2007 World Championships in Athletics was held at the Nagai Stadium on 28, 29 and 31 August. The winning margin was 0.51 seconds.

== Medalists ==
Gold	Silver	Bronze
Jeremy Wariner; United States	LaShawn Merritt; United States	Angelo Taylor; United States

== Records ==
Prior to the competition, the established records were as follows.

World record	Michael Johnson (USA)	43.18	Seville, Spain	26 August 1999
Championship record	Michael Johnson (USA)	43.18	Seville, Spain	26 August 1999
World Leading	Jeremy Wariner (USA)	43.50	Stockholm, Sweden	7 August 2007
African record	Gary Kikaya (COD)	44.10	Stuttgart, Germany	9 September 2006
Asian record	Mohamed Amer Al-Malky (OMA)	44.56	Budapest, Hungary	12 August 1988
North American record	Michael Johnson (USA)	43.18	Seville, Spain	26 August 1999
South American record	Sanderlei Parrela (BRA)	44.29	Seville, Spain	26 August 1999
European record	Thomas Schönlebe (GDR)	44.33	Rome, Italy	3 September 1987
Oceanian record	Darren Clark (AUS)	44.38	Seoul, South Korea	26 September 1988

== Schedule ==
Date	Time	Round
August 28, 2007	10:10	Heats
August 29, 2007	21:25	Semifinals
August 31, 2007	22:05	Final

== Results ==
KEY:	q	Fastest non-qualifiers	Q	Qualified	WR	World record	AR	Area record	NR	National record	PB	Personal best	SB	Seasonal best

=== Heats ===
Qualification: First 3 in each heat (Q) and the next 3 fastest (q) advance to the semifinals.

Rank	Heat	Name	Nationality	Time	Notes
1	1	Chris Brown	Bahamas	44.50	Q, SB
2	4	LaShawn Merritt	United States	44.78	Q
3	1	John Steffensen	Australia	44.82	Q, SB
4	1	Arismendy Peguero	Dominican Republic	44.92	Q, PB
5	4	Johan Wissman	Sweden	44.94	Q, NR
6	3	Alleyne Francique	Grenada	44.95	Q, SB
7	6	Nery Brenes	Costa Rica	45.01	Q, NR
8	2	Jeremy Wariner	United States	45.10	Q
9	6	Angelo Taylor	United States	45.13	Q
10	7	Tyler Christopher	Canada	45.15	Q
11	3	Leslie Djhone	France	45.17	Q
12	5	Gary Kikaya	Democratic Republic of the Congo	45.21	Q
13	7	Ato Modibo	Trinidad and Tobago	45.22	Q, SB
14	2	Avard Moncur	Bahamas	45.27	Q
15	5	Sanjay Ayre	Jamaica	45.28	Q
16	6	William Collazo	Cuba	45.29	Q, PB
17	4	Andrae Williams	Bahamas	45.31	Q
18	3	Ricardo Chambers	Jamaica	45.34	Q
19	2	David Gillick	Ireland	45.35	Q
20	6	California Molefe	Botswana	45.36	q, SB
21	7	Sean Wroe	Australia	45.39	Q
22	4	Young Talkmore Nyongani	Zimbabwe	45.40	q, SB
23	5	Timothy Benjamin	Great Britain	45.44	Q
23	6	Michael Blackwood	Jamaica	45.44	q
23	1	Bastian Swillims	Germany	45.44	PB
26	5	Chris Lloyd	Dominica	45.46	
27	2	Martyn Rooney	Great Britain	45.47	SB
28	2	Lewis Banda	Zimbabwe	45.47	SB
29	7	Daniel Dąbrowski	Poland	45.50	
30	3	Andrew Steele	Great Britain	45.54	
31	5	Vladislav Frolov	Russia	45.69	
32	1	Renny Quow	Trinidad and Tobago	45.70	
33	7	Andrea Barberi	Italy	45.74	SB
34	1	Marcin Marciniszyn	Poland	45.83	
35	3	Rafał Wieruszewski	Poland	45.94	SB
36	3	Carlos Santa	Dominican Republic	45.99	SB
37	2	Brice Panel	France	46.02	
38	3	Clemens Zeller	Austria	46.06	
39	1	Dimitrios Regas	Greece	46.22	SB
40	6	Yuki Yamaguchi	Japan	46.28	
41	4	Eric Milazar	Mauritius	46.55	
42	5	Ioan Vieru	Romania	46.78	
43	4	Andrés Silva	Uruguay	46.79	
44	2	Félix Martínez	Puerto Rico	46.86	
45	1	Takeshi Fujiwara	El Salvador	46.92	NR
46	7	Dimitrios Gravalos	Greece	46.94	
47	5	Mathieu Gnanligo	Benin	47.51	
48	6	Jonathon Lavers	Gibraltar	47.97	NR
49	6	Ivano Bucci	San Marino	48.07	PB
50	5	Nicolau Palanca	Angola	48.60	
51	4	Dalibor Spasovski	Macedonia	48.63	PB
52	7	Moses Kamut	Vanuatu	48.90	
53	4	Karar A.M. Al Abbody	Iraq	48.95	PB
54	2	Abdulla Mohamed Hussein	Somalia	50.54	PB
55	2	Hermán López	Nicaragua	50.72	
	3	Yuzo Kanemaru	Japan		DNF
	6	Nagmeldin Ali Abubakr	Sudan		DNF
	7	Lionel Larry	United States		DNF
	4	Gakologelwang Masheto	Botswana		DNS
	5	Hamdan Al-Bishi	Saudi Arabia		DNS

=== Semifinals ===
First 2 in each semifinal (Q) and the next 2 fastest (q) advance to the final.

Rank	Heat	Name	Nationality	Time	Notes
1	3	LaShawn Merritt	United States	44.31	Q
2	2	Jeremy Wariner	United States	44.33	Q
3	1	Angelo Taylor	United States	44.45	Q
4	3	Leslie Djhone	France	44.46	Q, NR
5	3	Tyler Christopher	Canada	44.47	q, SB
6	2	Chris Brown	Bahamas	44.50	Q
7	1	Johan Wissman	Sweden	44.56	Q, NR
8	1	Avard Moncur	Bahamas	44.86	q, SB
9	3	John Steffensen	Australia	44.95	
10	2	Ato Modibo	Trinidad and Tobago	45.12	SB
11	1	Nery Brenes	Costa Rica	45.14	
11	2	Gary Kikaya	Democratic Republic of the Congo	45.14	
13	2	Ricardo Chambers	Jamaica	45.18	
14	1	Sean Wroe	Australia	45.25	PB
15	2	David Gillick	Ireland	45.37	
16	3	Andrae Williams	Bahamas	45.40	
17	1	Alleyne Francique	Grenada	45.41	
18	2	California Molefe	Botswana	45.47	
19	1	Arismendy Peguero	Dominican Republic	45.54	
19	2	William Collazo	Cuba	45.54	
21	1	Michael Blackwood	Jamaica	45.60	
22	3	Timothy Benjamin	Great Britain	46.17	
23	3	Young Talkmore Nyongani	Zimbabwe	46.23	
	3	Sanjay Ayre	Jamaica		DNF

=== Final ===
Rank	Name	Nationality	Time	Notes
1st place, gold medalist(s)	Jeremy Wariner	United States	43.45	WL
2nd place, silver medalist(s)	LaShawn Merritt	United States	43.96	PB
3rd place, bronze medalist(s)	Angelo Taylor	United States	44.32	
4	Chris Brown	Bahamas	44.45	NR
5	Leslie Djhone	France	44.59	
6	Tyler Christopher	Canada	44.71	
7	Johan Wissman	Sweden	44.72	
8	Avard Moncur	Bahamas	45.40	
