= 2005 European Athletics Indoor Championships – Men's 4 × 400 metres relay =

The Men's 4 × 400 metres relay event at the 2005 European Athletics Indoor Championships was held on March 6.

== Results ==
Rank	Team	Athlete	Time	Notes
1st place, gold medalist(s)	France	Richard Maunier; Remi Wallard; Brice Panel; Marc Raquil	3:07.90	
2nd place, silver medalist(s)	Great Britain	Dale Garland; Daniel Cossins; Richard Davenport; Gareth Warburton	3:09.53	
3rd place, bronze medalist(s)	Russia	Andrey Polukeyev; Aleksandr Usov; Dmitriy Forshev; Alexander Borshchenko	3:09.63	
4	Germany	Florian Seitz; Sebastian Gatzka; Christian Duma; Henning Hackelbusch	3:10.14	
5	Spain	David Canal; Santiago Ezquerro; Luis Flores; Alberto Montero	3:11.72	
	Poland	Piotr Rysiukiewicz; Robert Maćkowiak; Piotr Klimczak; Marcin Marciniszyn	DQ	

Note: Poland originally finished second but was disqualified for colliding with the Spanish team before the last change-over.
