= 2007 European Cup (athletics) =

Athletics competition in Munich, Germany

- Logo of the Superleague
- Host city: Munich, Germany (Super League)
- Dates: 23–24 June 2007
- Main venue: Olympic Stadium (Super League)

The 2007 Spar European Cup took place on 23 and 24 June 2007 at the Olympic Stadium in Munich, Germany. This was the 27th time the European Cup had been held and the second time the event has been hosted in Munich. It was the penultimate staging of the Cup.

== Super League ==
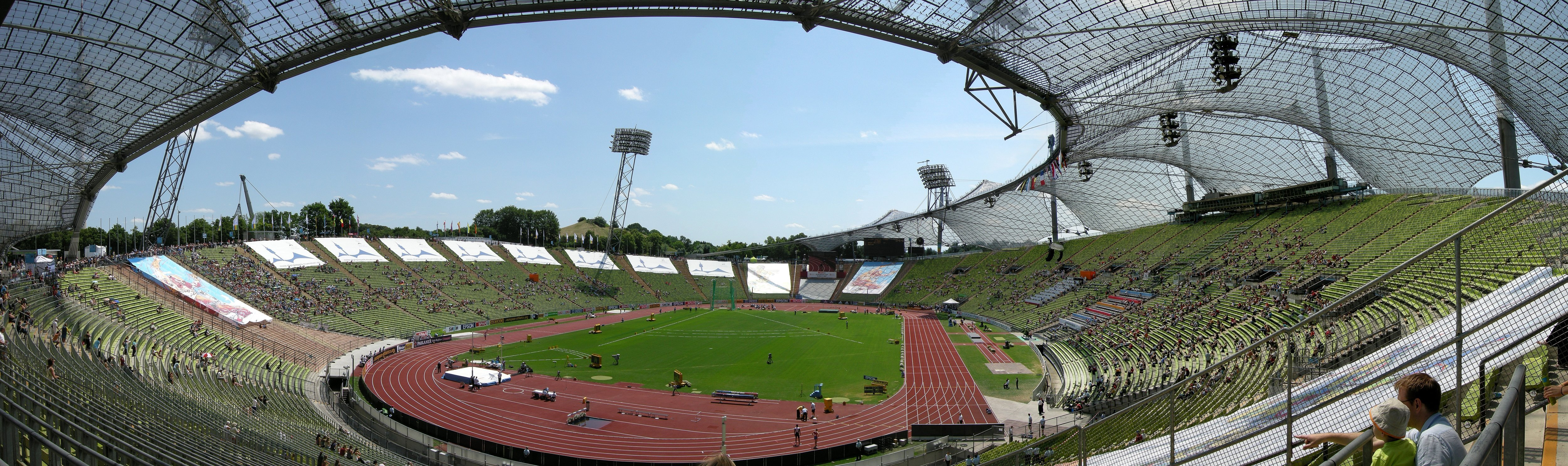
The Olympic Stadium during the 2007 European Cup

=== Final standings ===
Men

Pos	Country	Pts
1	France	116
2	Germany	116
3	Poland	110
4	Great Britain	101
5	Russia	93
6	Greece	70
7	Ukraine	58.5
8	Belgium	53.5

Women

Pos	Country	Pts
1	Russia	127
2	France	107
3	Germany	94.5
4	Poland	89
5	Ukraine	81
6	Belarus	80
7	Greece	75
8	Spain	64.5

Relegation to 1st League

Top six teams qualified for the 2008 European Indoor Cup.

=== Score table ===
Men

Event	BEL	GER	GBR	GRE	FRA	POL	RUS	UKR
100 metres	1	6	8	3	7	4	2	5
200 metres	4	3	8	6	7	5	2	1
400 metres	3	6	7	2	8	4	5	1
800 metres	4	6	7	1	2	8	5	3
1500 metres	2	6	7	1	8	5	3	4
3000 metres	4	1	5	3	8	6	7	2
5000 metres	8	7	2	1	5	3	6	4
110 metre hurdles	3	6	7	4	8	2	5	1
400 metre hurdles	2	4	3	8	6	7	5	0
3000 m Steeplechase	4	8	6	1	7	3	5	2
4 × 100 metres relay	1	6	8	4	7	5	3	2
4 × 400 metres relay	2	7	6	5	3	8	4	1
High jump	2.5	8	1	4	5	6	7	2.5
Pole vault	4	8	3	2	7	5	0	6
Long jump	1	6	2	8	4	7	3	5
Triple jump	1	2	7	5	3	4	8	6
Shot put	3	8	7	2	5	6	4	1
Discus throw	1	7	2	3	5	8	6	4
Hammer throw	1	7	2	6	4	8	5	3
Javelin throw	2	4	3	1	7	6	8	5

Women

Event	BLR	GER	GRE	FRA	POL	RUS	ESP	UKR
100 metres	6	7	3	5	2	8	1	4
200 metres	4	2	5	8	3	7	1	6
400 metres	6	5	8	3	4	7	1	2
800 metres	8	3	1	4	2	6	5	7
1500 metres	2	4	1	6	8	7	5	3
3000 metres	1	3	2	5	7	8	6	4
5000 metres	8	7	6	3	1	5	4	2
100 metre hurdles	3	5	4	7	2	6	1	8
400 metre hurdles	2	6	4	5	7	8	3	0
3000 m Steeplechase	2	1	6	7	8	4	3	5
4 × 100 metres relay	5	6	2	7	3	8	1	4
4 × 400 metres relay	8	4	3	6	7	0	2	5
High jump	1	4	4	6	2	8	7	4
Pole vault	1	3.5	5	6	8	2	3.5	7
Long jump	2	1	3	8	5	7	6	4
Triple jump	1	3	7	8	2	6	4	5
Shot put	6	7	2	4	5	8	3	1
Discus throw	6	8	2	3	4	7	1	5
Hammer throw	6	7	4	5	3	8	2	1
Javelin throw	2	8	3	1	6	7	5	4

=== Day 1 ===
==== Events and winners ====
Men

Event	Winner	Country
Hammer throw	Szymon Ziółkowski	Poland
High jump	Eike Onnen	Germany
400 m hurdles	Periklis Iakovakis	Greece
100 m	Craig Pickering	Great Britain
1500 m	Mehdi Baala	France
Shot put	Peter Sack	Germany
Long jump	Louis Tsatoumas	Greece
400 m	Leslie Djhone	France
5000 m	Monder Rizki	Belgium
4 × 100 m relay	Great Britain & NI	Great Britain

Women

Event	Winner	Country
Pole vault	Monika Pyrek	Poland
Triple jump	Teresa Nzola Meso Ba	France
400 m hurdles	Yuliya Pechenkina	Russia
Discus throw	Franka Dietzsch	Germany
100 m	Yevgeniya Polyakova	Russia
800 m	Sviatlana Usovich	Belarus
3000 m	Gulnara Galkina-Samitova	Russia
400 m	Fani Halkia	Greece
Javelin throw	Christina Obergföll	Germany
3000 m Steeplechase	Katarzyna Kowalska	Poland
4 × 100 m relay	Russian Federation	Russia

==== Standings ====
Men

Pos	Country	Pts
1	Germany	64
2	France	59
3	Poland	55
4	Great Britain	47
5	Russia	43
6	Greece	39
7	Ukraine	27.5
8	Belgium	24.5

Women

Pos	Country	Pts
1	Russia	71
2	France	54
3	Germany	53.5
4	Poland	53
5	Ukraine	47
6	Greece	43
7	Belarus	40
8	Spain	33.5

=== Day 2 ===
==== Events and winners ====
Men

Event	Winner	Country
Pole vault	Tim Lobinger	Germany
Triple jump	Aleksandr Petrenko	Russia
Discus throw	Piotr Małachowski	Poland
110 m hurdles	Ladji Doucouré	France
800 m	Paweł Czapiewski	Poland
3000 m Steeplechase	Filmon Ghirmai	Germany
200 m	Marlon Devonish	Great Britain
Javelin throw	Aleksandr Ivanov	Russia
3000 m	Bouabdellah Tahri	France
4 × 400 m relay	Poland	Poland

Women

Event	Winner	Country
Hammer throw	Tatyana Lysenko	Russia
Shot put	Anna Omarova	Russia
1500 m	Sylwia Ejdys	Poland
High jump	Yelena Slesarenko	Russia
100 m hurdles	Yevgeniya Snihur	Ukraine
Long jump	Eunice Barber	France
200 m	Muriel Hurtis	France
5000 m	Volha Krautsova	Belarus
4 × 400 m relay	Belarus	Belarus

=== Men's results ===
Event	Gold		Silver		Bronze	
100 metres	Craig Pickering (GBR)	10.15	Martial Mbandjock (FRA)	10.29	Christian Blum (GER)	10.35
200 metres	Marlon Devonish (GBR)	20.33	David Alerte (FRA)	20.34	Anastásios Goúsis (GRE)	20.43
400 metres	Leslie Djhone (FRA)	45.54	Tim Benjamin (GBR)	45.67	Bastian Swillims (GER)	45.95
800 metres	Paweł Czapiewski (POL)	1:49.00	Michael Rimmer (GBR)	1:49.06	Robin Schembera (GER)	1:49.06
1500 metres	Mehdi Baala (FRA)	3:47.36	Andy Baddeley (GBR)	3:48.08	Franek Haschke (GER)	3:48.54
3000 metres	Bouabdellah Tahri (FRA)	7:51.32	Sergey Ivanov (RUS)	8:02.47	Bartosz Nowicki (POL)	8:02.47
5000 metres	Monder Rizki (BEL)	14:15.46	Arne Gabius (GER)	14:16.09	Aleksandr Orlov (RUS)	14:16.57
3000 metres steeplechase	Filmon Ghirmai (GER)	8:38.78	Mahiedine Mekhissi-Benabbad (FRA)	8:39.34	Andrew Lemoncello (GBR)	8:39.94
100 m hurdles	Ladji Doucouré (FRA)	13.35	Andy Turner (GBR)	13.48	Thomas Blaschek (GER)	13.51
400 m hurdles	Periklís Iakovákis (GRE)	48.35	Marek Plawgo (POL)	48.90	Naman Keïta (FRA)	48.90
4 × 100 m relay	Great Britain (GBR); Tyrone Edgar; Craig Pickering; Marlon Devonish; Mark Lewis-Francis	38.30	France (FRA); Aimé-Issa Nthépé; David Alerte; Eddy De Lépine; Martial Mbandjock	38.40	Germany (GER); Christian Blum; Till Helmke; Alexander Kosenkow; Julian Reus	38.56
4 × 400 m relay	Poland (POL); Kacper Kozłowski; Marcin Marciniszyn; Piotr Rysiukiewicz; Daniel Dąbrowski	3:01.70	Germany (GER); Ingo Schultz; Kamghe Gaba; Matthias Bos; Bastian Swillims	3:01.77	Great Britain (GBR); Andrew Steele; Richard Strachan; Martyn Rooney; Daniel Caines	3:01.92
High jump	Eike Onnen (GER)	2.30 m	Andrey Tereshin (RUS)	2.30 m	Aleksander Waleriańczyk (POL)	2.24 m
Pole vault	Tim Lobinger (GER)	5.70 m	Romain Mesnil (FRA)	5.65 m	Denys Yurchenko (UKR)	5.60 m
Long jump	Loúis Tsátoumas (GRE)	8.16 m	Marcin Starzak (POL)	7.82 m	Nils Winter (GER)	7.70 m
Triple jump	Aleksandr Petrenko (RUS)	17.29 m	Phillips Idowu (GBR)	17.21 m	Mykola Savolaynen (UKR)	17.09 m
Shot put	Peter Sack (GER)	20.28 m	Carl Myerscough (GBR)	19.96 m	Tomasz Majewski (POL)	19.93 m
Discus throw	Piotr Małachowski (POL)	66.09 m	Robert Harting (GER)	63.90 m	Aleksandr Borichevskiy (RUS)	60.79 m
Hammer throw	Szymon Ziółkowski (POL)	77.99 m	Markus Esser (GER)	74.68 m	Aléxandros Papadimitríou (GRE)	73.83 m
Javelin throw	Aleksandr Ivanov (RUS)	82.57 m	Vitolio Tipotio (FRA)	79.69 m	Igor Janik (POL)	78.70 m

=== Women's results ===
Event	Gold		Silver		Bronze	
100 metres	Yevgeniya Polyakova (RUS)	11.20	Verena Sailer (GER)	11.35	Natallia Safronnikava (BLR)	11.36
200 metres	Muriel Hurtis (FRA)	22.83	Natalya Rusakova (RUS)	22.92	Iryna Shtanhyeyeva (UKR)	23.12
400 metres	Faní Halkiá (GRE)	51.85	Zhanna Kashcheyeva (RUS)	51.87	Yulyana Yushchanka (BLR)	52.09
800 metres	Sviatlana Usovich (BLR)	2:00.71	Yuliya Krevsun (UKR)	2:01.12	Oksana Zbrozhek (RUS)	2:01.14
1500 metres	Sylwia Ejdys (POL)	4:17.05	Maria Martins (FRA)	4:17.23	Iris María Fuentes-Pila (ESP)	4:17.75
3000 metres	Gulnara Galkina (RUS)	8:47.92	Lidia Chojecka (POL)	8:54.72	Dolores Checa (ESP)	8:58.35
5000 metres	Volha Krautsova (BLR)	15:20.35	Sabrina Mockenhaupt (GER)	15:23.96	Kalliópi Astropekáki (GRE)	15:46.22 PB
3000 metres steeplechase	Katarzyna Kowalska (POL)	9:45.35	Sophie Duarte (FRA)	9:50.02	Iríni Kokkinaríou (GRE)	9:53.83
100 m hurdles	Yevheniya Snihur (UKR)	12.92	Adrianna Lamalle (FRA)	12.94	Aleksandra Antonova (RUS)	12.97
400 m hurdles	Yuliya Pechonkina (RUS)	54.04	Anna Jesień (POL)	54.88	Ulrike Urbansky (GER)	55.74
4 × 100 m relay	Russia (RUS); Yuliya Gushchina; Natalya Rusakova; Irina Khabarova; Yevgeniya Polyakova	42.78	France (FRA); Carima Louami; Muriel Hurtis; Nelly Banco; Christine Arron	43.09	Germany (GER); Katja Tengel; Sina Schielke; Cathleen Tschirch; Verena Sailer	43.33
4 × 400 m relay	Belarus (BLR); Yulyana Yushchanka; Iryna Khliustava; Sviatlana Usovich; Ilona Usovich	3:23.67 NR	Poland (POL); Zuzanna Radecka-Pakaszewska; Monika Bejnar; Jolanta Kajtoch; Grażyna Prokopek-Janáček	3:26.36	France (FRA); Phara Anacharsis; Marie-Angélique Lacordelle; Virginie Michanol; Solen Désert-Mariller	3:28.62
High jump	Yelena Slesarenko (RUS)	2.02 m	Ruth Beitia (ESP)	1.98 m	Mélanie Melfort (FRA)	1.95 m
Pole vault	Monika Pyrek (POL)	4.65 m	Nataliya Mazuryk (UKR)	4.38 m	Vanessa Boslak (FRA)	4.38 m
Long jump	Eunice Barber (FRA)	6.73 m	Concepción Montaner (ESP)	6.72 m	Małgorzata Trybańska (POL)	6.65 m
Triple jump	Teresa Nzola Meso Ba (FRA)	14.69 m NR	Hrysopiyi Devetzi (GRE)	14.58 m	Victoria Valyukevich (RUS)	14.46 m
Shot put	Anna Omarova (RUS)	19.69 m PB	Petra Lammert (GER)	19.47 m	Nadzeya Ostapchuk (BLR)	18.52 m
Discus throw	Franka Dietzsch (GER)	63.60 m	Iryna Yatchenko (BLR)	62.54 m	Nataliya Semenova (UKR)	62.32 m
Hammer throw	Betty Heidler (GER)	73.55 m	Aksana Miankova (BLR)	73.03 m	Manuela Montebrun (FRA)	68.56 m
Javelin throw	Christina Obergföll (GER)	70.20 m NR	Oksana Gromova (RUS)	60.15 m	Barbara Madejczyk (POL)	59.36 m

== First League ==
=== Group A ===
At Vaasa, Finland, on 23 and 24 June 2007.

==== Final standings ====
Men

Pos	Country	Pts
1	Spain	111
2	Sweden	107
3	Netherlands	101.5
4	Czech Republic	93.5
5	Finland	88.5
6	Switzerland	81
7	Ireland	76
8	Slovakia	59.5

Women

Pos	Country	Pts
1	Great Britain	131
2	Sweden	110
3	Czech Republic	102
4	Finland	98
5	Netherlands	78
6	Ireland	76
7	Norway	73
8	Slovakia	50

Promotion to Superleague
Relegation to 2nd League

=== Group B ===
At Milan, Italy, on the same dates.

==== Final standings ====
Men

Pos	Country	Pts
1	Italy	135
2	Slovenia	105
3	Portugal	102
4	Romania	98
5	Hungary	89
6	Belarus	85
7	Bulgaria	57
8	Serbia	46

Women

Pos	Country	Pts
1	Italy	139
2	Romania	123
3	Portugal	95.5
4	Bulgaria	84
5	Hungary	82
6	Slovenia	72.5
7	Serbia	61.5
8	Cyprus	58.5

Promotion to Superleague
Relegation to 2nd League

The best team from each group also qualified for the 2008 European Indoor Cup.

== Second League ==
=== Group A ===
At Odense, Denmark, on 23 & 24 June 2007.

==== Final standings ====
Men

Pos	Country	Pts
1	Austria	120.5
2	Norway	118
3	Latvia	111
4	Estonia	109.5
5	Denmark	104
6	Lithuania	72
7	Iceland	50
8	Andorra	30

Women

Pos	Country	Pts
1	Belgium	124
2	Lithuania	117
3	Latvia	109
4	Austria	102
5	Estonia	101
6	Denmark	83.5
7	Iceland	61.5
8	Andorra	20

Promotion to 1st League

=== Group B ===
At Zenica, Bosnia and Herzegovina, on the same dates.

==== Final standings ====
Men

Pos	Country	Pts
1	Turkey	232
2	Croatia	226
3	Cyprus	209
4	Israel	208
5	Moldova	196.5
6	Bosnia and Herzegovina	158.5
7	Luxembourg	151
8	Azerbaijan	142.5
9	Georgia	124.5
10	Montenegro	115
11	Armenia	106
12	AASSE	72
13	Albania	66
14	Macedonia	57

Women

Pos	Country	Pts
1	Turkey	254
2	Croatia	246
3	Switzerland	243
4	Moldova	217
5	Israel	180
6	Bosnia and Herzegovina	155.5
7	Luxembourg	149
8	Montenegro	118
9	Azerbaijan	110.5
10	Armenia	98
11	Georgia	90.5
12	Albania	78
13	AASSE	55
14	Macedonia	46.5

Promotion to 1st League

== See also ==
- 2007 in athletics (track and field)
