= 2003 European Athletics U23 Championships – Men's 400 metres hurdles =

The men's 400 metres hurdles event at the 2003 European Athletics U23 Championships was held in Bydgoszcz, Poland, at Zawisza Stadion on 17, 18, and 19 July.

== Medalists ==
Gold	Marek Plawgo; Poland
Silver	Christian Duma; Germany
Bronze	Thomas Kortbeek; Netherlands

== Results ==
=== Final ===
19 July

Rank	Name	Nationality	Time	Notes
1st place, gold medalist(s)	Marek Plawgo	Poland	48.45	CR
2nd place, silver medalist(s)	Christian Duma	Germany	49.53	
3rd place, bronze medalist(s)	Thomas Kortbeek	Netherlands	49.68	
4	Roman Matveyev	Russia	49.90	
5	Aleksandr Borshchenko	Russia	50.09	
6	Sébastien Maillard	France	50.28	
7	Yauheni Mikheika	Belarus	50.52	
8	Andrey Kozlovskiy	Belarus	50.91	

=== Semifinals ===
18 July
Qualified: first 4 in each to the Final

==== Semifinal 1 ====
Rank	Name	Nationality	Time	Notes
1	Marek Plawgo	Poland	49.80	Q
2	Sébastien Maillard	France	50.24	Q
3	Aleksandr Borshchenko	Russia	50.56	Q
4	Andrey Kozlovskiy	Belarus	51.00	Q
5	Henning Hackelbusch	Germany	51.29	
6	Andrei Oll	Estonia	51.59	
7	Silvain Gertsch	Switzerland	51.61	
8	Jaroslav Růža	Czech Republic	116.97	

==== Semifinal 2 ====
Rank	Name	Nationality	Time	Notes
1	Christian Duma	Germany	49.73	Q
2	Roman Matveyev	Russia	50.15	Q
3	Yauheni Mikheika	Belarus	50.20	Q
4	Thomas Kortbeek	Netherlands	50.36	Q
5	Loïc Clément	France	51.22	
6	Ondřej Daněk	Czech Republic	51.31	
7	Ákos Dezsö	Hungary	51.52	
8	Steven Green	Great Britain	52.76	

=== Heats ===
17 July
Qualified: first 3 in each heat and 4 best to the Semifinal

==== Heat 1 ====
Rank	Name	Nationality	Time	Notes
1	Christian Duma	Germany	50.76	Q
2	Loïc Clément	France	51.00	Q
3	Roman Matveyev	Russia	51.21	Q
4	Steven Green	Great Britain	51.64	q
5	Alejandro Navarro	Spain	52.42	
6	Oleksandr Hladkov	Ukraine	53.89	

==== Heat 2 ====
Rank	Name	Nationality	Time	Notes
1	Sébastien Maillard	France	50.46	Q
2	Andrey Kozlovskiy	Belarus	50.61	Q
3	Henning Hackelbusch	Germany	51.09	Q
4	Andrei Oll	Estonia	51.17	q
5	Silvain Gertsch	Switzerland	51.74	q
6	Pablo Martínez	Spain	51.74	
7	Luca Bortolaso	Italy	53.78	

==== Heat 3 ====
Rank	Name	Nationality	Time	Notes
1	Marek Plawgo	Poland	51.00	Q
2	Yauheni Mikheika	Belarus	51.24	Q
3	Jaroslav Růža	Czech Republic	52.05	Q
4	César Boileau	France	52.40	
5	Jussi Heikkilä	Finland	52.45	
6	Henning Kuschewitz	Germany	56.41	

==== Heat 4 ====
Rank	Name	Nationality	Time	Notes
1	Thomas Kortbeek	Netherlands	50.69	Q
2	Aleksandr Borshchenko	Russia	51.39	Q
3	Ondřej Daněk	Czech Republic	51.46	Q
4	Ákos Dezsö	Hungary	51.69	q
5	Andriy Fatyeyev	Ukraine	51.84	
6	Ragnar Bergheim	Norway	52.65	

== Participation ==
According to an unofficial count, 25 athletes from 16 countries participated in the event.

- Belarus (2)
- Czech Republic (2)
- Estonia (1)
- Finland (1)
- France (3)
- Germany (3)
- Great Britain (1)
- Hungary (1)
- Italy (1)
- Netherlands (1)
- Norway (1)
- Poland (1)
- Russia (2)
- Spain (2)
- Switzerland (1)
- Ukraine (2)
