= Andrey Polukeyev =

Russian sprinter (born 1981)

Personal information
- Native name: Андрей Андреевич Полукеев
- Full name: Andrey Andreevich Polukeyev
- Born: 13 May 1981 (age 45) Polevoy, Voznesensky Selsoviet, Sosnovsky District, Chelyabinsk Oblast, Russia

Sport
- Country: Russia
- Sport: Sport of athletics
- Event: 400 metres

Achievements and titles
- National finals: 2002 Russian Champs; • 400m, 8th; 2003 Russian U23s; • 400m, 1st (gold); 2005 Russian Champs; • 400m, 4th; 2006 Russian Indoors; • 400m, 6th
- Personal bests: 200m: 21.38 (+0.9) (2002); 400m: 46.43 (2005)
Medal record
Men's athletics
Representing Russia
World Indoor Championships
Bronze medal – third place	2006 Moscow	4 × 400 m relay
European Indoor Championships
Bronze medal – third place	2005 Madrid	4 × 400 m relay
European U23 Championships
Bronze medal – third place	2003 Bydgoszcz	4 × 400 m relay
World University Games
Silver medal – second place	2003 Daegu	4 × 400 m relay
- Updated on November 2024

Andrey Andreevich Polukeyev (Russian: Андрей Андреевич Полукеев; born 13 May 1981) is a Russian former sprinter specializing in the 400 metres and the 9th World Athletics Indoor Championships bronze medallist in the 4 × 400 m relay. Polukeyev also won relay medals at the European Athletics Indoor Championships, European Athletics U23 Championships, and World University Games.

== Career ==
Polukeyev reached his first Russian Athletics Championships final in 2002, placing 8th in the 400 m. He won the Russian U23 Athletics Championships in the same event the following year.

At the 2003 European Athletics U23 Championships, Polukeyev competed in the 400 m and 4 × 400 m. He placed 5th in his 400 m heat but he did anchor the Russian 4 × 400 m team to the bronze medal. Later that summer, Polukeyev ran 3rd leg in the heats of the 4 × 400 m relay at the World University Games, qualifying for the finals with a heat win. He was replaced by Sergey Babayev in the finals where the Russian team won the silver medal behind Ukraine.

In 2005, Polukeyev led off the Russian 4 × 400 m team at the European Indoor Championships, winning the bronze medal. After a 4th-place finish at the Russian Championships, Polukeyev competed in his only World Athletics Championships, qualifying for the 2005 4 × 400 m. Running 3rd leg, he helped the Russian team to 3rd in their heat, but he was replaced by Oleg Mishukov in the finals and the team finished 7th.

Polukeyev's 6th-place finish at the 2006 Russian Indoor Athletics Championships was good enough to qualify him for the Russian relay team at the 2006 IAAF World Indoor Championships held in Moscow. In the semi-finals, Polukeyev's 2nd leg split contributed to Russia winning their heat in a season's best time. In the finals, he was replaced by Dmitry Petrov who anchored Russia to a bronze medal behind the U.S. and Poland.

== Personal life ==
Polukeyev was born on 13 May 1981 in Polevoy, Voznesensky Selsoviet, Sosnovsky District, Chelyabinsk Oblast, Russia. He is married with two children.

In 2006, Polukeyev received the Honored Master of Sports of Russia award.

After retiring in 2010, Polukeyev worked in the collateral expertise department of Sberbank, a Russian state-owned banking company. In 2014, he graduated from the Chelyabinsk State Agroengineering Academy, specializing in economics and enterprise management. Beginning in April 2019, Polukeyev worked in the administration of a settlement in his home town of Sosnovsky District, Chelyabinsk Oblast.

== Statistics ==
=== Personal best progression ===
400m progression
#	Mark	Pl.	Competition	Venue	Date	Ref.
1	47.25	(gold) (Round 3)	Rus Cup	Tula, Russia	31 May 2002	
2	47.00	(bronze) (Round 2)	Znam	Tula, Russia	7 Jun 2002	
3	46.84	(gold) (Round 2)	Znam	Tula, Russia	7 Jun 2003	
4	46.73	1st place, gold medalist(s)	NC-j	Cheboksary, Russia	27 Jun 2003	
5	46.56	6th (Semifinal 1)	Russian Athletics Championships	Tula, Russia	29 Jul 2004	
6	46.43	4th	Russian Athletics Championships	Tula, Russia	10 Jul 2005	
