= Angelo Taylor =

American track and field athlete (born 1978)

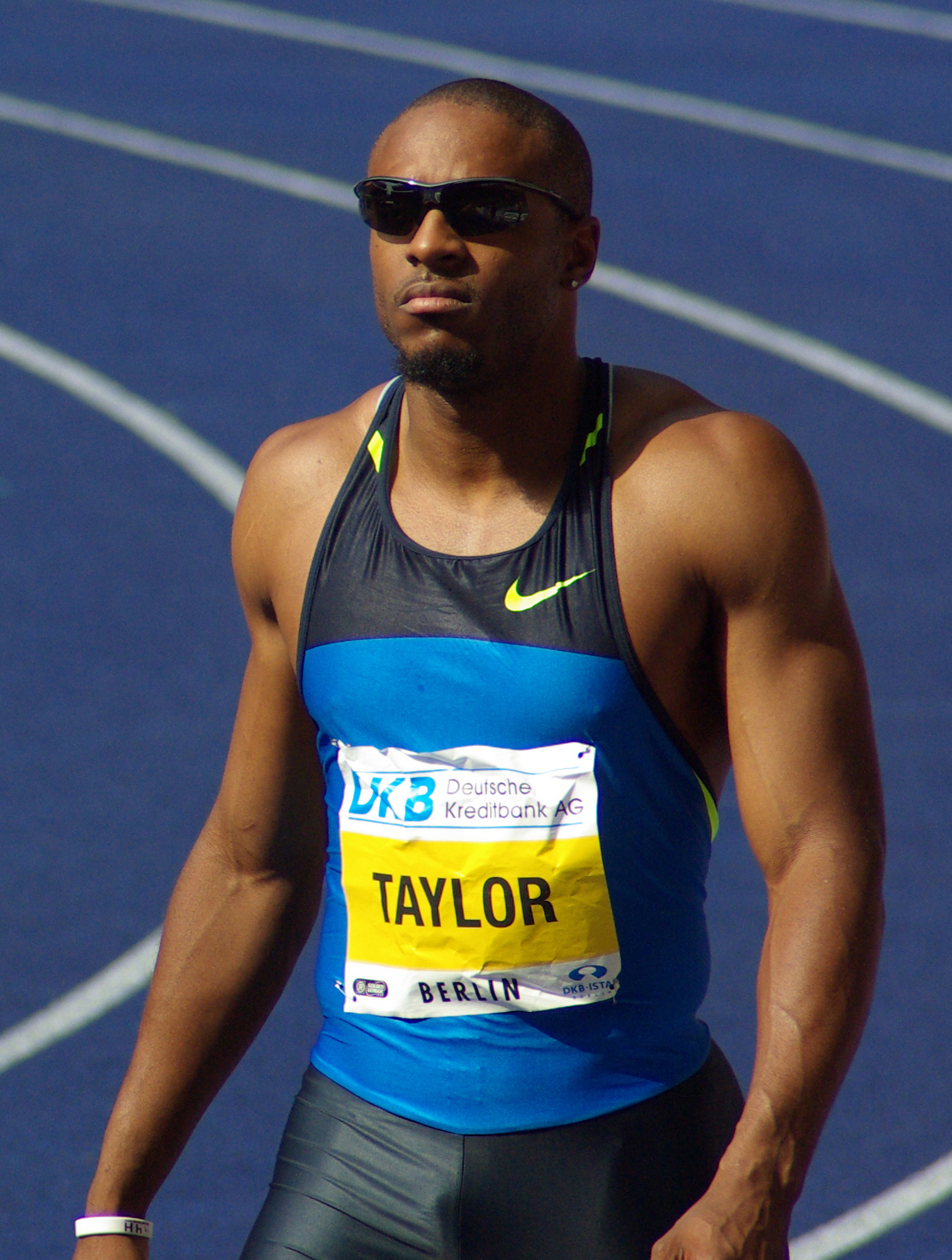
- Taylor at the 2008 ISTAF Berlin

Personal information
- Born: December 29, 1978 (age 47) Albany, Georgia, U.S.
- Height: 6 ft 2 in (1.88 m)
- Weight: 185 lb (84 kg)

Sport
- Country: United States
- Sport: Athletics
- Events: 400 m Hurdles, 4 × 400 m Relay
- College team: Georgia Tech Yellow Jackets
Medal record
Men's athletics
Representing the United States
Olympic Games
Gold medal – first place	2000 Sydney	400 m hurdles
Gold medal – first place	2008 Beijing	400 m hurdles
Gold medal – first place	2008 Beijing	4 × 400 m relay
Silver medal – second place	2012 London	4 × 400 m relay
World Championships
Gold medal – first place	2007 Osaka	4 × 400 m relay
Gold medal – first place	2009 Berlin	4 × 400 m relay
Gold medal – first place	2011 Daegu	4 × 400 m relay
Bronze medal – third place	2007 Osaka	400 m
Disqualified	1999 Seville	4 × 400 m relay (Note: Teammate Antonio Pettigrew later admitted to using performance-enhancing drugs and the IAAF disqualified the team.)
Disqualified	2001 Edmonton	4 × 400 m relay

Angelo F. Taylor (born December 29, 1978) is an American track and field athlete, winner of 400-meter hurdles at the 2000 and 2008 Summer Olympics. His personal record for the hurdles event is 47.25 seconds. His time puts him in a tie with Félix Sánchez for the #14 performer of all time.Taylor also has a 400-meter dash best of 44.05 seconds, ranking him as the joint 29th performer of all time. He won the bronze medal in the 400 m at the 2007 World Championships in Athletics.

He is a three-time world champion in the 4 × 400 m relay with the United States (2007, 2009 and 2011), and was also a relay gold medalist at the 2008 Beijing Olympics and silver medalist at the 2012 London Olympics.

Since 2019, Taylor has been serving a ban from the United States Center for SafeSport for his 2006 criminal convictions involving minors.

== Career ==
=== Early life ===
Born in Albany, Georgia, Angelo Taylor studied at the Georgia Institute of Technology and won the NCAA title in 1998 and placed second in 1997. In 1998, Taylor also won a silver medal at the US National Championships. He went on to win the title three times from 1999 to 2001.

Taylor made his debut in a major international meet at the 1999 World Championships, where he finished third in his heat in 400 m hurdles, but ran a third leg at the gold medal-winning US 4 × 400 m relay team.

=== 2000 Olympic champion ===
In 2000, Taylor ran a world-leading time at the Olympic Trials and entered the Sydney Games as a favorite. In a thrilling final, Taylor moved from fourth place to first over the final two hurdles and barely edged Saudi Arabia's Hadi Souan Somayli by 0.03 seconds in the closest finish in the history of the event. Taylor ran in the heat and semifinal of 4 × 400 m relay race, the finals team for which won the gold medal. On August 2, 2008, the International Olympic Committee stripped the gold medal from the U.S. men's 4x400-meter relay team, after Antonio Pettigrew admitted using a banned substance. Three of the four runners in the event final, including Pettigrew and twins Alvin and Calvin Harrison, and preliminary round runner Jerome Young, all have admitted or tested positive for performance-enhancing drugs. Only Taylor and world record holder Michael Johnson were not implicated.

Taylor was eliminated in the semifinals of the 2001 World Championships in 400 m hurdles while struggling with a sinus infection and flu, but won a gold as a member of US 4 × 400 m relay team. He didn't make the US World Championships team in 2003 and was unsuccessful in defending his Olympic title at the 2004 Summer Olympics, finishing fourth in the semifinal.

=== Second Olympic title ===
In 2007 Taylor set a new personal best in the 400 m and won the American title in the event. He won the 400 m bronze medal at the 2007 World Championships in Osaka and won another gold medal as part of the USA 4 × 400 m relay team.

At the 2008 Summer Olympics in Beijing, China, Taylor became a double Olympic champion, winning gold in the 400 metre hurdles and the 4 × 400 m relay. At the 2009 World Championships in Athletics he failed to make it out of the heats of the hurdles, but was part of the American 4 × 400 m relay team which successfully defended its world title.

Taylor finished second in the 200 m at the 2010 Rieti IAAF Grand Prix in August with a new personal record time of 20.23 seconds. He fell behind Kerron Clement and Bershawn Jackson in the hurdles rankings that year, but in the 2010 IAAF Diamond League he managed top three finishes in Lausanne, Monaco and Stockholm. He had a season's best of 47.79 seconds for the event that year. He also had two podium finishes in the 400 m, coming second at the Golden Gala and third in a season's best of 44.72 seconds at the Weltklasse Zurich.

He came third in the 400 m hurdles at the 2011 USA Outdoor Track and Field Championships with a season's best run of 47.94 seconds, gaining a place on the national team. He won at the Herculis meeting in July, but did not peak for the 2011 World Championships in Athletics, where he finished seventh in the final. He performed well in the relay, however, taking the United States to victory in a time of 2:59.31 minutes alongside Greg Nixon, Bershawn Jackson and LaShawn Merritt.

Taylor began his 2012 season with a runner-up finish at the Mt. SAC Relays. He was third over 400 m at the Doha 2012 Diamond League meet and won the first 400 m hurdles race in Shanghai.

=== 2012 London Summer Olympics ===
Taylor was captain of the USA men's track Olympic squad in his fourth Olympics. The two-time 400 m hurdles gold medalist finished fifth in the event in a time of 48.25. In the 4 × 400 × m relay finals, Taylor ran the anchor leg and was given the lead but was chased down by the Bahamas, so the USA team won the silver medal.

== Statistics ==
=== Personal bests ===
Event	Best	Location	Date
100 metres	10.58	Athens, GA	19 April 2008
200 metres	20.23	Rieti, Italy	29 August 2010
300 metres	32.67	Liège, Belgium	27 August 2002
400 metres	44.05	Indianapolis, IN	23 June 2007
400 metres hurdles	47.25	Beijing, China	18 August 2008

== Personal life ==
Taylor currently resides in Atlanta, Georgia with wife Lynnita and is father to twin boys Xzaviah and Isaiah. His father, Angelo Taylor Sr., was also involved in sports and he competed in football and track at Albany State University. His family spent time living in Saudi Arabia in the 1990s as he was training and setting his sights on the Olympics.

=== SafeSport suspension ===
On May 16, 2019, the Orange County Register published an exposé of the failure of the United States Center for SafeSport to suspend Taylor after receiving notification of his 2006 criminal convictions, for contributing to the delinquency of two 15-year-old girls, as required by the United States Center for SafeSport code. USA Track & Field issued a "provisional suspension" for Taylor later that day. He was placed on USATF's list of suspended individuals, where as of February 2025 he still remained. SafeSport officially noted Taylor's violation that same day, and declared him ineligible, with the announced reason being "Criminal Disposition – involving minor".

== See also ==
- Alberto Salazar, track and field athlete and coach, banned for life by the United States Center for SafeSport for sexual misconduct

== Notes ==
Awards
Preceded by (Italy) Fabrizio Mori	Men's 400 m Hurdles Best Year Performance; 2000	Succeeded by (Dominican Republic) Félix Sánchez

Sporting positions
Preceded by Fabrizio Mori	Men's 400 m Hurdles Best Year Performance; 2000	Succeeded by Félix Sánchez
Preceded by Kerron Clement	Men's 400 m Hurdles Best Year Performance; 2008	Succeeded by Kerron Clement
