= Christian Duma =

German athlete

Christian Duma (born 5 February 1982, in Cluj-Napoca) is a German athlete, who specializes in the 400 metres hurdles.

His personal best time is 49.17 seconds, achieved in June 2005 in Florence.

== Achievements ==
Year	Competition	Venue	Position	Event	Notes
Representing Germany
2000	World Junior Championships	Santiago, Chile	4th	400m hurdles	50.60
2000	World Junior Championships	Santiago, Chile	2nd	4 × 400 m relay	3:06.79
2001	European Junior Championships	Grosseto, Italy	1st	400 m hurdles	50.26
2002	World Cup	Madrid, Spain	8th	400 m hurdles	50.57
2003	European U23 Championships	Bydgoszcz, Poland	2nd	400m hurdles	49.53
2003	European U23 Championships	Bydgoszcz, Poland	2nd	4 × 400 m relay	3:03.36
2005	European Indoor Championships	Madrid, Spain	4th	4 × 400 m relay	3:10.14
