= Leslie Djhone =

French track and field athlete

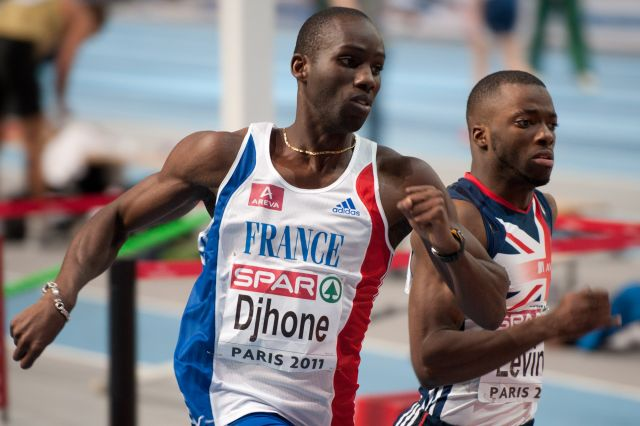
- Djhone (left) at the 2011 European Athletics Indoor Championships

Personal information
- Nationality: French
- Born: 18 March 1981 (age 45) Abidjan, Ivory Coast
- Height: 1.87 m (6 ft 2 in)
- Weight: 76 kg (168 lb)

Sport
- Sport: sprinting
Medal record
Men's athletics
Representing France
World Championships
Gold medal – first place	2003 Paris	4 × 400 m relay
European Championships
Gold medal – first place	2006 Gothenburg	4 × 400 m relay
Bronze medal – third place	2002 Munich	4 × 400 m relay
Bronze medal – third place	2006 Gothenburg	400 m
European Indoor Championships
Gold medal – first place	2011 Paris	400 m
Gold medal – first place	2011 Paris	4 × 400 m relay

Leslie Djhone (born 18 March 1981 in Abidjan, Ivory Coast) is a French track and field athlete who competes in the 400 metres and 4 × 400 metres relay.

Djhone won the 400 metres gold medal at the 2011 European Indoor Championships and the 400 metres bronze medal at the 2006 European Championships. In the final of the 400 m event, he finished 4th at the 2003 World Championships, 5th at the 2007 World Championships, 8th at the 2009 World Championships, 7th at the 2004 Olympics and 5th at the 2008 Olympics.

Djhone has also enjoyed some success in the 4 × 400 metres relay, the highlight being a gold medal each at the 2003 World Championships, 2011 European Indoor Championships and 2006 European Championships. He also won the bronze medal at the 2002 European Championships.

Djhone set a new national outdoor record of 44.46 seconds in the semi-finals of the 400 m event at the 2007 World Championships in Osaka, Japan.

Djhone set a new national indoor record in the 400 m with a run of 45.85 seconds at the 2010 French Athletics Championships, taking 17 hundredths of a second off Stéphane Diagana's 18-year-old mark. In 2011, he won the 400 m (in a new national indoor record time of 45.54 seconds) and the 4 × 400 m relay gold medals at the 2011 European Indoor Championships.

== Personal bests ==
- 100 metres outdoor – 10.55 s (2003)
- 200 metres outdoor – 20.67 s (2004)
- 400 metres outdoor – 44.46 s (2007)
- Long jump outdoor – 7.92 m (1999)
- 400 metres indoor – 45.54 s (2011)

== Results in international competitions ==
- Note: Only the position in the final is indicated

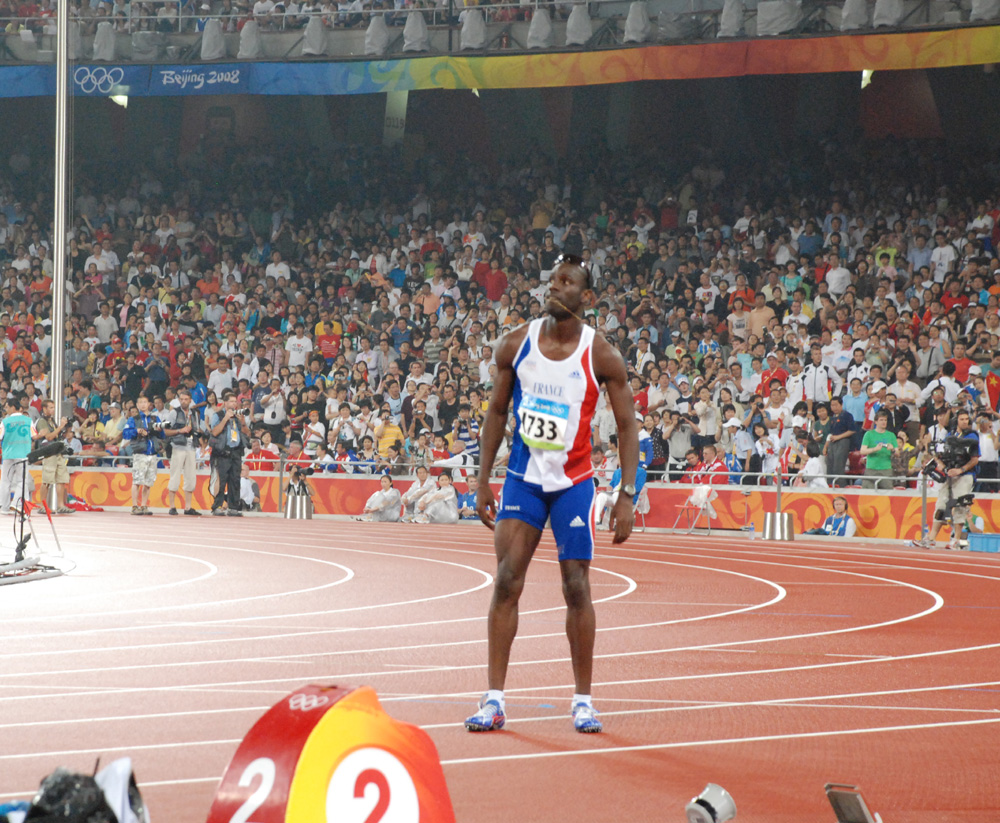
Leslie Djhone at the 2008 Olympics.

Year	Competition	Venue	Position	Event	Notes
Representing France
1998	World Junior Championships	Annecy, France	15th (q)	Long jump	7.46 m (wind: -0.3 m/s)
1999	European Junior Championships	Riga, Latvia	1st	4 × 100 m relay	39.49
2000	World Junior Championships	Santiago, Chile	2nd	4 × 100 m relay	39.33
2001	European U23 Championships	Amsterdam, Netherlands	4th	Long jump	7.80 m (wind: 0.2 m/s)
2001	European U23 Championships	Amsterdam, Netherlands	4th	4 × 100 m relay	40.02
2002	European Championships	Munich, Germany	3rd	4 × 400 m relay	3:02.76
2003	European U23 Championships	Bydgoszcz, Poland	1st	400 m	45.04
2003	European U23 Championships	Bydgoszcz, Poland	2nd	4 × 100 m relay	39.38
2003	World Championships	Paris, France	4th	400 m	44.83
2003	World Championships	Paris, France	1st	4 × 400 m relay	2:58.96
2004	Olympic Games	Athens, Greece	7th	400 m	44.94
2004	Olympic Games	Athens, Greece	eliminated in the 1st round heats	4 × 400 m relay	3:04.39
2004	IAAF World Athletics Final	Monte Carlo, Monaco	4th	400 m	45.26
2004	European Cup	Bydgoszcz, Poland	3rd	400 m	45.73
2005	World Championships	Helsinki, Finland	eliminated in the 1st round heats	400 m	46.57
2005	World Championships	Helsinki, Finland	6th	4 × 400 m relay	3:03.10
2006	European Championships	Gothenburg, Sweden	3rd	400 m	45.40
2006	European Championships	Gothenburg, Sweden	1st	4 × 400 m relay	3:01.10
2006	European Cup	Málaga, Spain	1st	4 × 400 m relay	3:03.59
2007	World Championships	Osaka, Japan	5th	400 m	44.59
2007	World Championships	Osaka, Japan	eliminated in the 1st round heats	4 × 400 m relay	3:04.45
2007	European Cup	Munich, Germany	1st	400 m	45.54
2008	Olympic Games	Beijing, China	5th	400 m	45.11
2009	World Championships	Berlin, Germany	8th	400 m	45.90
2009	World Championships	Berlin, Germany	7th	4 × 400 m relay	3:02.65
2010	European Championships	Barcelona, Spain	6th	400 m	45.30
2010	European Championships	Barcelona, Spain	6th	4 × 400 m relay	3:03.85
2010	European Team Championships	Bergen, Norway	2nd	400 m	45.72
2011	European Indoor Championships	Paris, France	1st	400 m	45.54
2011	European Indoor Championships	Paris, France	1st	4 × 400 m relay	3:06.17
