= Rafał Wieruszewski =

Polish sprinter

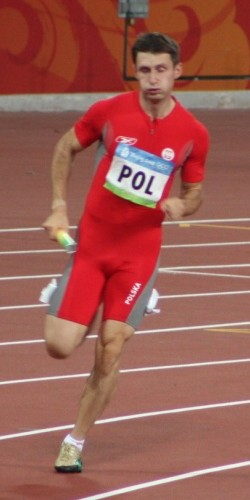
- Wieruszewski in 2008

Personal information
- Nationality: Polish
- Born: 24 February 1981 (age 45) Środa Wielkopolska, Poland

Sport
- Sport: 400 metres
Medal record
Men's athletics
Representing Poland
World Championships
Bronze medal – third place	2001 Edmonton	4×400m relay
Bronze medal – third place	2007 Osaka	4×400m relay
World Indoor Championships
Silver medal – second place	2006 Moscow	4×400m relay
Bronze medal – third place	2003 Birmingham	4x400 m relay
European Championships
Bronze medal – third place	2006 Gothenburg	4x400 m relay

Rafał Wieruszewski (born 24 February 1981 in Środa Wielkopolska) is a Polish sprinter who specializes in the 400 metres.

== Achievements ==
Year	Competition	Venue	Position	Event	Notes
Representing Poland
1999	European Junior Championships	Riga, Latvia	9th (h)	400 m	47.68
1999	European Junior Championships	Riga, Latvia	2nd	4 × 400 m relay	3:08.15
2000	World Junior Championships	Santiago, Chile	8th	400 m	46.37
2000	World Junior Championships	Santiago, Chile	3rd	4 × 400 m relay	3:07.05
2001	European U23 Championships	Amsterdam, Netherlands	3rd	400 m	46.57
2001	World Championships	Edmonton, Canada	3rd (h)	4 × 400 m relay	2:59.71
2001	Goodwill Games	Brisbane, Australia	3rd	4 × 400 m relay	3:04.79
2003	World Indoor Championships	Birmingham, United Kingdom	3rd	4 × 400 m relay	3:06.61
2003	European U23 Championships	Bydgoszcz, Poland	3rd	400 m	45.87
2003	European U23 Championships	Bydgoszcz, Poland	1st	4 × 400 m relay	3:03.32
2003	Universiade	Daegu, South Korea	3rd	400 m	46.53
2005	World Championships	Helsinki, Finland	3rd (h)	4 × 400 m relay	3:00.38
2005	Universiade	İzmir, Turkey	1st	4 × 400 m relay	3:02.57
2006	World Indoor Championships	Moscow, Russia	2nd	4 × 400 m relay	3:04.67
2006	European Championships	Gothenburg, Sweden	7th	400 m	45.97
2006	European Championships	Gothenburg, Sweden	3rd	4 × 400 m relay	3:01.73
2006	World Cup	Athens, Greece	5th	4 × 400 m relay	3:03.90
2007	World Championships	Osaka, Japan	35th (h)	400 m	45.94
2007	World Championships	Osaka, Japan	7th (h)	4 × 400 m relay	3:02.39
2008	Olympic Games	Beijing, China	7th	4 × 400 m relay	3:00.32
2009	Universiade	Belgrade, Serbia	2nd	4 × 400 m relay	3:05.69
2009	World Championships	Berlin, Germany	9th (h)	4 × 400 m relay	3:03.23

=== Personal bests ===
- 200 metres – 21.06 s (2002)
- 400 metres – 45.56 s (2006)
