= Daniel Dąbrowski =

Polish sprinter (born 1983)

Medal record

Representing Poland

Men's athletics

World Championships
Bronze medal – third place	2007 Osaka	4×400m relay

World Indoor Championships
Silver medal – second place	2006 Moscow	4×400m relay

European Championships
Bronze medal – third place	2006 Gothenburg	4x400 m relay

Daniel Dąbrowski (born 23 September 1983 in Łódź) is a Polish sprinter who specializes in the 400 metres and 4 × 400 metres relay.

== Achievements ==
Year	Competition	Venue	Position	Event	Notes
Representing Poland
2003	European U23 Championships	Bydgoszcz, Poland	15th (h)	400 m	47.11
2003	European U23 Championships	Bydgoszcz, Poland	1st	4 x 400 m relay	3:03.32
2004	World Indoor Championships	Budapest, Hungary	9th (h)	4 x 400 m relay	3:10.33
2005	European U23 Championships	Erfurt, Germany	3rd	400 m	47.44
2005	European U23 Championships	Erfurt, Germany	1st	4 x 400 m relay	3:02.57
2005	Universiade	İzmir, Turkey	12th (sf)	400 m	47.12
2005	Universiade	İzmir, Turkey	1st	4 x 400 m relay	3:02.57
2006	World Indoor Championships	Moscow, Russia	7th (sf)	400 m	46.61
2006	World Indoor Championships	Moscow, Russia	2nd	4 x 400 m relay	3:04.67
2006	European Championships	Gothenburg, Sweden	4th	400 m	45.56
2006	European Championships	Gothenburg, Sweden	3rd	4 x 400 m relay	3:01.73
2006	World Cup	Athens, Greece	5th	400 m	45.61
2006	World Cup	Athens, Greece	5th	4 x 400 m relay	3:03.90
2007	Universiade	Bangkok, Thailand	1st	4 x 400 m relay	3:02.05
2007	World Championships	Osaka, Japan	29th (h)	400 m	45.50
2007	World Championships	Osaka, Japan	3rd	4 x 400 m relay	3:00.05
2008	Olympic Games	Beijing, China	51st (h)	400 m	47.83
2010	European Championships	Barcelona, Spain	5th	4 x 400 m relay	3:03.42

=== Personal bests ===
- 100 metres - 10.58 s (2006)
- 200 metres - 20.74 s (2006)
- 400 metres - 45.38 s (2006)
