= 2003 European Athletics U23 Championships =

4th European Athletics U23 Championships
- Dates: 17–20 July 2003
- Host city: Bydgoszcz, Poland
- Venue: Zawisza Stadion
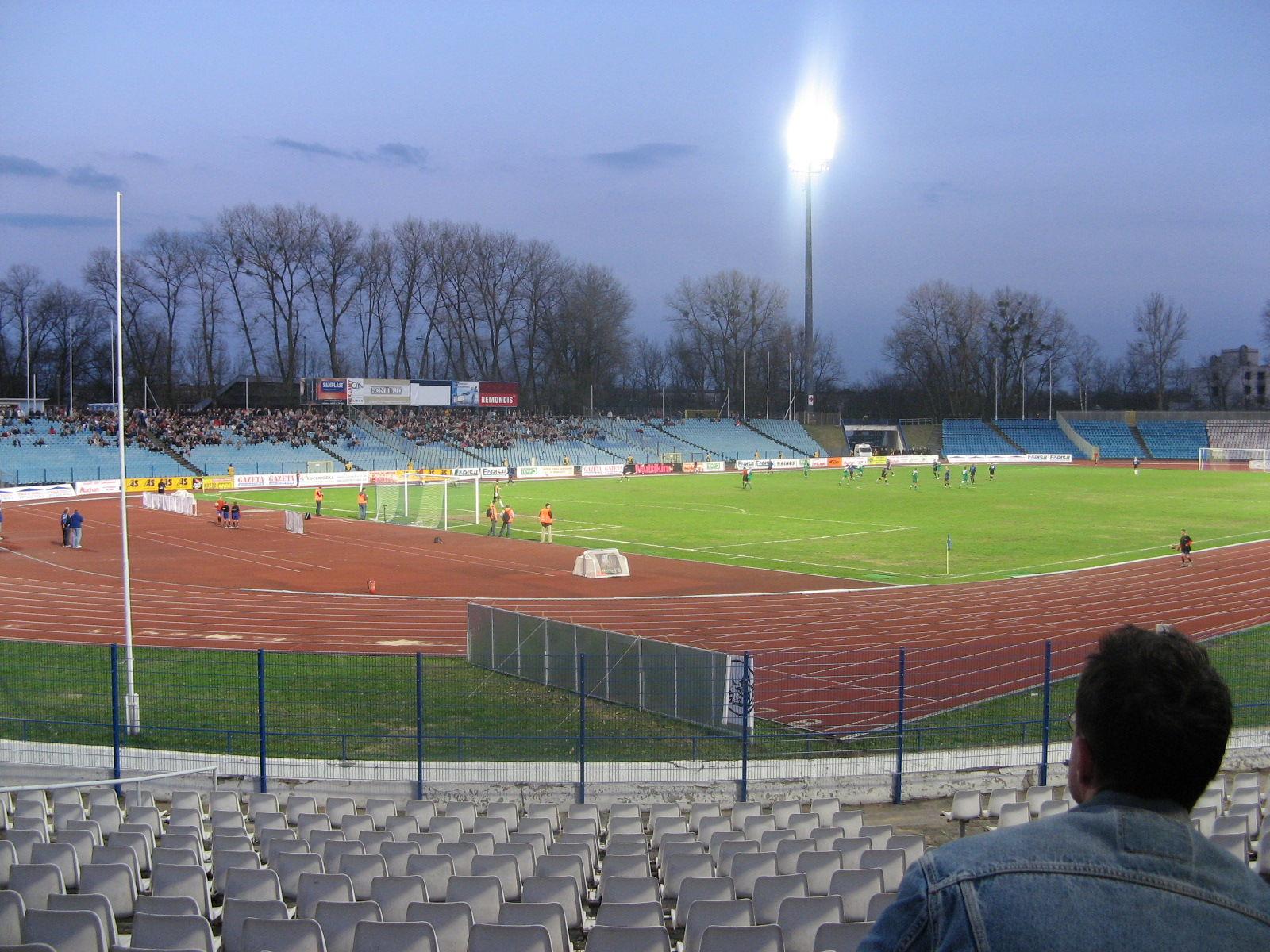
- Level: U23
- Type: Outdoor
- Events: 44
- Participation: 815 athletes from 46 nations

The 4th European Athletics U23 Championships were held in Bydgoszcz, Poland at the Zdzisław Krzyszkowiak Stadium between 17 and 20 July 2003.

== Results ==
Complete results and medal winners were published.

=== Men's ===
Event	Gold		Silver		Bronze	
100 metres	Ronald Pognon; France	10.19	Argo Golberg; Estonia	10.28 (NR)	Fabrice Calligny; France	10.34
200 metres	Chris Lambert; Great Britain	20.34	Marcin Jędrusiński; Poland	20.39	Johan Wissman; Sweden	20.43
400 metres	Leslie Djhone; France	45.04	Timothy Benjamin; Great Britain	45.86	Rafał Wieruszewski; Poland	45.87
800 metres	René Herms; Germany	1:46.26	Florent Lacasse; France	1:46.47	Manuel Olmedo; Spain	1:46.83
1500 metres	Mounir Yemmouni; France	3:44.02	Xavier Areny; Spain	3:44.65	Lorenzo Perrone; Italy	3:45.05
5000 metres	Christopher Thompson; Great Britain	13:58.62	Mo Farah; Great Britain	13:58.88	Robert Connolly; Ireland	14:03.75
10,000 metres	Ioannis Kanelopoulos; Greece	29:00.78	Vasyl Matviychuk; Ukraine	29:01.29	Paweł Ochal; Poland	29:17.41
110 metres hurdles	Ladji Doucouré; France	13.25	Philip Nossmy; Sweden	13.50	Gregory Sedoc; Netherlands	13.55
400 metres hurdles	Marek Plawgo; Poland	48.45	Christian Duma; Germany	49.53	Thomas Kortbeek; Netherlands	49.68
3000 metres steeplechase	Martin Pröll; Austria	8:25.86	Radosław Popławski; Poland	8:27.95	Jukka Keskisalo; Finland	8:28.53
4 × 100 metres relay	Great Britain; Tyrone Edgar; Chris Lambert; Darren Chin; Dwayne Grant	39.31	France; Daniel Adolia; Fabrice Calligny; David Socrier; Leslie Dhjone	39.38	Belgium; Pieter-Jan Vereecke; François Gourmet; Kristof Beyens; Xavier de Baerdemacker	39.54
4 × 400 metres relay	Poland; Rafał Wieruszewski; Kacper Skalski; Daniel Dąbrowski; Marek Plawgo	3:03.32	Germany; Sebastian Gatzka; Christian Duma; Steffen Staffelmaier; Bastian Swillims	3:03.36	Russia; Roman Matveyev; Dmitriy Petrov; Aleksandr Borshchenko; Andrey Polukeyev	3:04.18
20 kilometres walk	Benjamin Kuciński; Poland	1:22:07	Sergey Lystsov; Russia	1:24:04	Andrey Talashko; Belarus	1:24:28
High jump	Aleksander Waleriańczyk; Poland	2.36	Andrey Tereshin; Russia	2.27	Wojciech Borysiewicz; Poland	2.27
Pole vault	Oleksandr Korchmid; Ukraine	5.50	Marvin Osei-Tutu; Germany	5.50	Maksym Mazuryk; Ukraine	5.45
Long jump	Louis Tsatoumas; Greece	8.24	Volodymyr Zyuskov; Ukraine	8.22	Danut Simion; Romania	8.09
Triple jump	Dmitrij Valukevic; Belarus	17.57	Marian Oprea; Romania	17.28	Rudolf Helpling; Germany	16.66
Shot put	Pavel Lyzhyn; Belarus	20.43	Pavel Sofin; Russia	20.33	Rutger Smith; Netherlands	20.18
Discus throw	Rutger Smith; Netherlands	59.90	Dmitriy Sivakov; Belarus	58.00	Bogdan Pishchalnikov; Russia	56.88
Hammer throw	Krisztián Pars; Hungary	77.25	Eşref Apak; Turkey	76.52	Aleksandr Vashchyla; Belarus	71.91
Javelin throw	Alexandr Ivanov; Russia	82.59	Igor Janik; Poland	82.54	Tero Pitkämäki; Finland	78.84
Decathlon	André Niklaus; Germany	7983	Indrek Turi; Estonia	7864	Atis Vaisjuns; Latvia	7681

=== Women's ===
Event	Gold		Silver		Bronze	
100 metres	Georgia Kokloni; Greece	11.33	Daria Onyśko; Poland	11.46	Aksana Drahun; Belarus	11.48
200 metres	Maryna Maydanova; Ukraine	22.82	Maja Nose; Slovenia	23.09	Dorota Dydo; Poland	23.34
400 metres	Helen Karagounis; Great Britain	51.78	Solene Désert; France	52.05	Tatyana Firova; Russia	52.14
800 metres	Becky Lyne; Great Britain	2:04.66	Lucia Klocová; Slovakia	2:05.02	Esther Desviat; Spain	2:05.38
1500 metres^{†}	Olesya Chumakova; Russia	4:11.75	Lisa Dobriskey; United Kingdom	4:12.95	Ingvill Måkestad; Norway	4:13.58
5000 metres	Elvan Abeylegesse; Turkey	15:16.79	Tatyana Petrova; Russia	16:02.79	Sonia Bejarano; Spain	16:17.81
10,000 metres	Krisztina Papp; Hungary	33:23.02	Valentina Levushkina; Russia	33:28.73	Louise Damen; Great Britain	33:29.82
100 metres hurdles	Susanna Kallur; Sweden	12.88	Nadine Hentschke; Germany	12.89	Mariya Koroteyeva; Russia	12.95
400 metres hurdles	Oksana Gulumyan; Russia	56.23	Irena Zauna; Latvia	56.47	Maria Rus; Romania	57.01
3000 metres steeplechase	Lyubov Ivanova; Russia	9:41.16	Michaela Mannová; Czech Republic	9:42.01	Sigrid Vanden Bempt; Belgium	9:42.04
4 × 100 metres relay	Ukraine; Nataliya Pyhyda; Iryna Shepetyuk; Olena Chebanu; Maryna Maydanova	44.29	Poland; Anna Radoszewska; Daria Onyśko; Dorota Dydo; Małgorzata Fleiszar	44.51	Germany; Tanja Kuckelkorn; Lisa Schorr; Katja Wakan; Nadine Hentschke	44.59
4 × 400 metres relay	Russia; Yuliya Gushchina; Natalya Ivanova; Oksana Gulumyan; Tatyana Firova	3:29.25	Great Britain; Jenny Meadows; Danielle Halsall; Kim Wall; Helen Karagounis	3:30.44	Germany; Eillen Müller; Katharina Gröb; Tina Kron; Claudia Hoffmann	3:33.59
20 kilometres walk	Athanasia Tsoumeleka; Greece	1:33:55	Vera Santos; Portugal	1:35:18	Sabine Zimmer; Germany	1:35:56
High jump	Blanka Vlašić; Croatia	1.98	Yelena Slesarenko; Russia	1.96	Anna Ksok; Poland	1.92
Pole vault	Yelena Isinbayeva; Russia	4.65	Vanessa Boslak; France	4.40	Anna Rogowska; Poland	4.35
Long jump	Carolina Klüft; Sweden	6.86	Irina Simagina; Russia	6.70	Ineta Radēviča; Latvia	6.70
Triple jump	Viktoriya Gurova; Russia	14.37	Simona La Mantia; Italy	14.31	Ineta Radēviča; Latvia	14.04
Shot put	Natalia Khoroneko; Belarus	17.66	Kathleen Kluge; Germany	17.09	Filiz Kadoğan; Turkey	16.72
Discus throw	Natalya Fokina; Ukraine	59.30	Jana Tucholke; Germany	58.24	Olga Chernogorova; Belarus	56.57
Hammer throw	Kamila Skolimowska; Poland	71.38	Aksana Miankova; Belarus	67.58	Gulfiya Khanafeyeva; Russia	66.98
Javelin throw	Jarmila Klimešová; Czech Republic	60.54	Irina Kharun; Ukraine	58.28	Mariya Yakovenko; Russia	57.52
Heptathlon	Jennifer Oeser; Germany	5901	Yvonne Wisse; Netherlands	5895	Vasiliki Delinikola; Greece	5863

^{†}: In the 1500 metres event, Rasa Drazdauskaitė from Lithuania ranked initially 2nd (4:12.16), but was disqualified for infringement of IAAF doping rules.

== Medal table ==
* Host nation (Poland)

Rank	Nation	Gold	Silver	Bronze	Total
1	Russia (RUS)	7	7	6	20
2	Poland (POL)*	5	5	6	16
3	Great Britain (GBR)	5	4	1	10
4	France (FRA)	4	4	1	9
5	Ukraine (UKR)	4	3	1	8
6	Greece (GRE)	4	0	1	5
7	Germany (GER)	3	6	4	13
8	Belarus (BLR)	3	2	4	9
9	Sweden (SWE)	2	1	1	4
10	Hungary (HUN)	2	0	0	2
11	Netherlands (NED)	1	1	3	5
12	Turkey (TUR)	1	1	1	3
13	Czech Republic (CZE)	1	1	0	2
14	Austria (AUT)	1	0	0	1
14	Croatia (CRO)	1	0	0	1
16	Estonia (EST)	0	2	0	2
17	Latvia (LAT)	0	1	3	4
17	Spain (ESP)	0	1	3	4
19	Romania (ROU)	0	1	2	3
20	Italy (ITA)	0	1	1	2
21	Portugal (POR)	0	1	0	1
21	Slovakia (SVK)	0	1	0	1
21	Slovenia (SLO)	0	1	0	1
24	Belgium (BEL)	0	0	2	2
24	Finland (FIN)	0	0	2	2
26	Ireland (IRL)	0	0	1	1
26	Norway (NOR)	0	0	1	1
Totals (27 entries)		44	44	44	132

== Participation ==
According to an unofficial count, 816 athletes from 46 countries participated in the event.

- Albania (3)
- Armenia (1)
- Austria (5)
- Azerbaijan (2)
- Belarus (44)
- Belgium (23)
- Bosnia and Herzegovina (1)
- Bulgaria (5)
- Croatia (12)
- Cyprus (5)
- Czech Republic (23)
- Denmark (3)
- Estonia (17)
- Finland (33)
- France (61)
- Georgia (1)
- Germany (62)
- Great Britain (53)
- Greece (27)
- Hungary (22)
- Iceland (2)
- Ireland (18)
- Israel (4)
- Italy (34)
- Latvia (14)
- Liechtenstein (1)
- Lithuania (12)
- Luxembourg (1)
- Macedonia (2)
- Malta (2)
- Moldova (5)
- Netherlands (18)
- Norway (8)
- Poland (68)
- Portugal (11)
- Romania (18)
- Russia (48)
- San Marino (2)
- Serbia and Montenegro (5)
- Slovakia (10)
- Slovenia (6)
- Spain (41)
- Sweden (28)
- Switzerland (13)
- Turkey (6)
- Ukraine (35)
