= 2006 IAAF World Cup =

- Dates: 16–17 September
- Host city: Athens, Greece
- Venue: Olympic Stadium
- Events: 40
- Participation: ? athletes

The 10th IAAF World Cup in Athletics was an international track and field sporting event, held under the auspices of the International Association of Athletics Federations, which took place on 16 and 17 September 2006 at the Olympic Stadium in Athens, Greece.

== Teams ==
The teams that took part in the competition were:

Men		Women	
Team	Qualification	Team	Qualification
Greece	Host nation	Greece	Host nation
Africa		Africa	
America		America	
Asia		Asia	
Europe		Europe	
Oceania		Oceania	
France	European Cup winner	Poland	European Cup runner up
Russia	European Cup runner up	Russia	European Cup winner
United States		United States	

== Overall points table ==
=== Men ===
Rank	Team	Result
1	Europe	140
2	United States	136
3	Africa	116
4	Asia	110
5	Americas	104
6	Russia	89
7	France	79
8	Oceania	78
9	Greece	44

=== Women ===
Rank	Team	Result
1	Russia	137
2	Europe	128
3	America	117
4	United States	101.5
5	Poland	97
6	Africa	96.5
7	Asia	85.5
8	Oceania	73
9	Greece	60.5

== Medal summary ==
=== Men ===
Event	Gold		Silver		Bronze	
100 metres	Tyson Gay (USA); United States	9.88	Francis Obikwelu (POR); Europe	10.09	Marc Burns (TRI); Americas	10.14
200 metres	Wallace Spearmon (USA); United States	19.87	Usain Bolt (JAM); Americas	19.96	Shingo Suetsugu (JPN); Asia	20.30
400 metres	LaShawn Merritt (USA); United States	44.54	Gary Kikaya (COD); Africa	44.66	Dimitrios Regas (GRE); Greece	45.11; NR
800 metres	Yusuf Saad Kamel (BHR); Asia	1:44.98	Bram Som (NED); Europe	1:45.13	Mbulaeni Mulaudzi (RSA); Africa	1:45.14
1500 metres	Alex Kipchirchir (KEN); Africa	3:52.60	Ivan Heshko (UKR); Europe	3:53.33	Nick Willis (NZL); Oceania	3:54.76
3000 metres	Craig Mottram (AUS); Oceania	7:32.19; CR	Kenenisa Bekele (ETH); Africa	7:36.25	Driss Maazouzi (FRA); France	7:47.80
5000 metres	Saif Saaeed Shaheen (QAT); Asia	13:35.30	Mike Kigen (KEN); Africa	13:36.19	Matt Tegenkamp (USA); United States	13:36.83
110 metres hurdles	Allen Johnson (USA); United States	12.96; CR MWR	Liu Xiang (CHN); Asia	13.03	Dayron Robles (CUB); Americas	13.06
400 metres hurdles	Kerron Clement (USA); United States	48.12	L. J. van Zyl (RSA); Africa	48.35	Marek Plawgo (POL); Europe	48.76
3000 metres steeplechase	Saif Saaeed Shaheen (QAT); Asia	8:19.09; CR	Paul Kipsiele Koech (KEN); Africa	8:19.37	Bouabdellah Tahri (FRA); France	8:29.06
4×100 metres relay	United States; Kaaron Conwright; Wallace Spearmon; Tyson Gay; Jason Smoots	37.59; CR	Europe; Dwain Chambers; Dwayne Grant; Marlon Devonish; Mark Lewis-Francis	38.45	Asia; Naoki Tsukahara; Shingo Suetsugu; Shinji Takahira; Shigeyuki Kojima	38.51
4×400 metres relay	United States; Jamel Ashley; Derrick Brew; LaShawn Merritt; Darold Williamson	3:00.11	Americas; Chris Brown; Michael Blackwood; Carlos Santa; Alleyne Francique	3:00.14	Africa; Paul Gorries; Gary Kikaya; Young Talkmore Nyongani; Malik Louahla	3:00.88
High jump	Tomáš Janků (CZE); Europe	2.28 m	Andrey Silnov (RUS); Russia	2.24 m	Tora Harris (USA); United States	2.24 m
Pole vault	Steven Hooker (AUS); Oceania	5.80 m	Daichi Sawano (JPN); Asia	5.70 m	Germán Chiaraviglio (ARG); Americas	5.70 m
Long jump	Irving Saladino (PAN); Americas	8.26 m	Andrew Howe (ITA); Europe	8.12 m	Mohamed Salman Al-Khuwalidi (KSA); Asia	8.11 m
Triple jump	Walter Davis (USA); United States	17.54 m	Jadel Gregório (BRA); Americas	17.41 m	Marian Oprea (ROU); Europe	17.05 m
Shot put	Ralf Bartels (GER); Europe	20.67 m	Reese Hoffa (USA); United States	20.60 m	Pavel Sofin (RUS); Russia	20.45 m
Discus throw	Virgilijus Alekna (LTU); Europe	67.19 m	Ehsan Haddadi (IRI); Asia	62.60 m	Ian Waltz (USA); United States	62.12 m
Hammer throw	Koji Murofushi (JPN); Asia	82.01 m	Ivan Tsikhan (BLR); Europe	80.00 m	Ilya Konovalov (RUS); Russia	77.14 m
Javelin throw	Andreas Thorkildsen (NOR); Europe	87.17 m	Gerhardus Pienaar (RSA); Africa	83.62 m	Aleksandr Ivanov (RUS); Russia	81.87 m

=== Women ===
Event	Gold		Silver		Bronze	
100 metres	Sherone Simpson (JAM); Americas	10.97	Torri Edwards (USA); United States	11.19	Vida Anim (GHA); Africa	11.21
200 metres	Sanya Richards (USA); United States	22.23	Kim Gevaert (BEL); Europe	22.72	Vida Anim (GHA); Africa	22.81; PB
400 metres	Sanya Richards (USA); United States	48.70; WL	Vania Stambolova (BUL); Europe	50.09	Novlene Williams (JAM); Americas	50.24
800 metres	Zulia Calatayud (CUB); Americas	2:00.06	Janeth Jepkosgei (KEN); Africa	2:00.09	Olga Kotlyarova (RUS); Russia	2:00.84
1500 metres	Maryam Yusuf Jamal (BHR); Asia	4:00.84	Tatyana Tomashova (RUS); Russia	4:02.45	Sarah Jamieson (AUS); Oceania	4:02.82
3000 metres	Tirunesh Dibaba (ETH); Africa	8:33.78; CR	Lidia Chojecka (POL); Poland	8:39.69	Kara Goucher (USA); United States	8:41.42; PB
5000 metres	Meseret Defar (ETH); Africa	14:39.11; CR	Liliya Shobukhova (RUS); Russia	15:05.33	Kayoko Fukushi (JPN); Asia	15:06.69
100 metres hurdles	Brigitte Foster-Hylton (JAM); Americas	12.67	Susanna Kallur (SWE); Europe	12.77	Ginnie Powell (USA); United States	12.90
400 metres hurdles	Yuliya Pechonkina (RUS); Russia	53.88	Lashinda Demus (USA); United States	54.06	Anna Jesień (POL); Poland	54.48
3000 metres steeplechase	Alesia Turava (BLR); Europe	9:29.10	Jeruto Kiptum (KEN); Africa	9:31.44	Wioletta Janowska (POL); Poland	9:35.08
4×100 metres relay	Americas; Aleen Bailey; Debbie Ferguson-McKenzie; Cydonie Mothersille; Sherone Simpson	42.26; WL	Russia; Yuliya Gushchina; Natalia Rusakova; Irina Khabarova; Yekaterina Grigoryeva	42.36	Africa; Ene Franca Idoko; Endurance Ojokolo; Esther Dankwah; Vida Anim	43.61
4×400 metres relay	Americas; Shericka Williams; Tonique Darling; Christine Amertil; Novlene Williams	3:19.84; WL	United States; DeeDee Trotter; Monique Henderson; Moushaumi Robinson; Lashinda Demus	3:20.69	Russia; Svetlana Pospelova; Olga Kotlyarova; Yuliya Pechonkina; Tatyana Veshkurova	3:21.21
High jump	Yelena Slesarenko (RUS); Russia	1.97 m	Tia Hellebaut (BEL); Europe	1.97 m	Marina Aitova (KAZ); Asia; Amy Acuff (USA); United States	1.94 m
Pole vault	Yelena Isinbayeva (RUS); Russia	4.60 m CR	Fabiana Murer (BRA); Americas	4.55 m	Gao Shuying (CHN); Asia	4.50 m
Long jump	Lyudmila Kolchanova (RUS); Russia	6.78 m	Naide Gomes (POR); Europe	6.68 m	Hrysopiyi Devetzi (GRE); Greece	6.64 m
Triple jump	Tatyana Lebedeva (RUS); Russia	15.13 m	Hrysopiyi Devetzi (GRE); Greece	15.04 m	Yamilé Aldama (SUD); Africa	14.78 m
Shot put	Valerie Vili (NZL); Oceania	19.87 m	Olga Ryabinkina (RUS); Russia	19.54 m	Yumileidi Cumbá (CUB); Americas	19.12 m
Discus throw	Franka Dietzsch (GER); Europe	66.07 m	Aretha Thurmond (USA); United States	61.83 m	Song Aimin (CHN); Asia	61.47 m
Hammer throw	Kamila Skolimowska (POL); Poland	75.29 m CR	Tatyana Lysenko (RUS); Russia	74.44 m	Yipsi Moreno (CUB); Americas	73.99 m
Javelin throw	Steffi Nerius (GER); Europe	63.37 m	Sonia Bisset (CUB); Americas	61.74 m	Justine Robbeson (RSA); Africa	61.38 m
