= Sebastian Gatzka =

German sprinter

Sebastian Gatzka (born 19 May 1982 in Rotenburg an der Fulda) is a German sprinter who specializes in the 400 metres.

At the 2000 World Junior Championships Gatzka won a silver medal in 4 × 400 m relay with Christian Duma, Steffen Hönig and Bastian Swillims. Gatzka travelled to the 2004 Summer Olympics as a reserve team member, but did not make an Olympic start. At the 2005 European Indoor Championships he won a bronze medal in 400 m and came in fourth with the German 4 × 400 m relay team.

His personal best time is 45.88 seconds, achieved in July 2006 in Regensburg. He represents LG Eintracht Frankfurt and is coached by Volker Beck.
