= Allan Stuart =

British Paralympic athlete

Medal record

Track and field (athletics)

Representing United Kingdom

Paralympic Games
Silver medal – second place	2000 Sydney	400 metres - T20

Allan Stuart is a paralympic athlete from Great Britain competing mainly in category T20 sprint events.

Stuart competed in the 2000 Summer Paralympics in Sydney competing in the 100m and winning a silver medal in the T20 400m.
