= Marcin Marciniszyn =

Polish sprinter (born 1982)

Personal information
- Nationality: Polish
- Born: 7 September 1982 (age 43) Bystrzyca Kłodzka, Poland
- Height: 1.84 m (6 ft 0 in)
- Weight: 80 kg (176 lb)

Sport
- Sport: Athletics
- Event: 400 metres
- Club: WKS Śląsk Wrocław
Medal record
Men's athletics
Representing Poland
World Championships
Bronze medal – third place	2007 Osaka	4 x 400 m
World Indoor Championships
Silver medal – second place	2006 Moscow	4 x 400 m
Bronze medal – third place	2003 Birmingham	4 x 400 m
European Indoor Championships
Bronze medal – third place	2007 Birmingham	4 x 400 m
Bronze medal – third place	2009 Turin	4 x 400 m

Marcin Marciniszyn (born 7 September 1982, in Bystrzyca Kłodzka) is a Polish sprinter who specializes in the 400 metres.

== Competition record ==
Year	Competition	Venue	Position	Event	Notes
Representing Poland
2001	European Junior Championships	Grosseto, Italy	1st	4 × 400 m relay	3:06.12
2002	European Championships	Munich, Germany	–	4 × 400 m relay	DQ
2003	World Indoor Championships	Birmingham, United Kingdom	3rd	4 × 400 m relay	3:06.61
2004	Olympic Games	Athens, Greece	10th (h)	4 × 400 m relay	3:03.69
2005	European Indoor Championships	Madrid, Spain	6th (h)	400 m	46.89
2005	European Indoor Championships	Madrid, Spain	–	4 × 400 m relay	DQ
2005	World Championships	Helsinki, Finland	24th (h)	400 m	45.97
2005	World Championships	Helsinki, Finland	5th	4 × 400 m relay	3:00.58
2006	World Indoor Championships	Moscow, Russia	9th (sf)	400 m	46.97
2006	World Indoor Championships	Moscow, Russia	2nd	4 × 400 m relay	3:04.67
2006	European Championships	Gothenburg, Sweden	12th (sf)	400 m	45.96
2007	European Indoor Championships	Birmingham, United Kingdom	3rd	4 × 400 m relay	3:08.14
2007	World Championships	Osaka, Japan	34th (h)	400 m	45.83
2007	World Championships	Osaka, Japan	3rd	4 × 400 m relay	3:00.05
2009	European Indoor Championships	Turin, Italy	3rd	4 × 400 m relay	3:07.04
2009	World Championships	Berlin, Germany	22nd (h)	400 m	45.77
2009	World Championships	Berlin, Germany	5th	4 × 400 m relay	3:02.23
2010	World Indoor Championships	Doha, Qatar	14th (h)	400 m	47.23
2010	World Indoor Championships	Doha, Qatar	9th (h)	4 × 400 m relay	3:09.86
2010	European Championships	Barcelona, Spain	10th (sf)	400 m	45.58
2010	European Championships	Barcelona, Spain	5th	4 × 400 m relay	3:03.42
2011	European Indoor Championships	Paris, France	5th	4 × 400 m relay	3:09.31
2011	World Championships	Daegu, South Korea	18th (sf)	400 m	45.94
2011	World Championships	Daegu, South Korea	11th (h)	4 × 400 m relay	3:01.84
2012	World Indoor Championships	Istanbul, Turkey	6th	4 × 400 m relay	3:11.86
2012	European Championships	Helsinki, Finland	7th	400m	46.46
2012	European Championships	Helsinki, Finland	4th	4 × 400 m relay	3:02.37
2012	Olympic Games	London, United Kingdom	34th (h)	400m	46.35
2012	Olympic Games	London, United Kingdom	9th (h)	4 × 400 m relay	3:02.86
2013	World Championships	Moscow, Russia	7th (h)	4 × 400 m relay	3:01.73
2014	IAAF World Relays	Nassau, Bahamas	19th (h)	4 × 400 m relay	3:05.16

=== Personal bests ===
Outdoor

- 100 metres – 10.76 s (2012)
- 200 metres – 21.07 s (2011)
- 400 metres – 45.27 s (2011)

Indoor

- 400 metres – 46.64 (2006)
