= Jamel Ashley =

American sprinter

Personal information
- Full name: Jamel Michael Ashley'
- Born: April 14, 1979 (age 47) Dublin, Georgia, U.S.
- Height: 6 ft 2 in (1.88 m)
- Weight: 180 lb (82 kg)

Sport
- Sport: Track and Field
- Event: Sprints
- College team: Mississippi State Bulldogs

Achievements and titles
- Personal best(s): 100m: 10.49 (Nashville 2004); 200m: 20.70 (Eugene 2005); 400m: 44.75 (Sacramento 2005)
- Updated on May 16, 2012

Jamel Michael Ashley (born April 17, 1979) is an American athlete, competing in the sprint events.

He attended West Laurens High School in Dexter, Georgia, and later Mississippi State University.
