= Dimitrios Regas =

Greek sprinter

Personal information
- Born: 12 September 1986 (age 39)

Sport
- Event: 400 metres

Achievements and titles
- Personal bests: 45.11 s NR
Medal record
European Junior Championships
Bronze medal – third place	2005 Kaunas	400 m
World Cup
Bronze medal – third place	2006 Athens	400 m

Dimítrios Régas (Greek: Δημήτρης Ρέγας; born 12 September 1986), in Lesbos (Mytilini) island, is a Greek sprint athlete.

He won the bronze medal (46.79 sec) in the 400 metres at 2005 European Athletics Junior Championships. At the age of 20, Regas finished eighth (46.23 sec) in the 400 metres final at the 2006 European Athletics Championships in Gothenburg, having set a PB of 45.60 sec at the semifinals. The same year he was third at the 2006 IAAF World Cup held at Athens Olympic Stadium with his personal best of 45.11 seconds, which still holds as a Greek national record.

He was a member of Panellinios S.C and was coached by former Greek champion Georgios Panagiotopoulos.
Height: 1.76, Weight: 70 kg,

Regas was suspended from competition for using the banned steroid "Methyltrienolone" in July 2008 in his A sample.
