= Bastian Swillims =

German sprinter

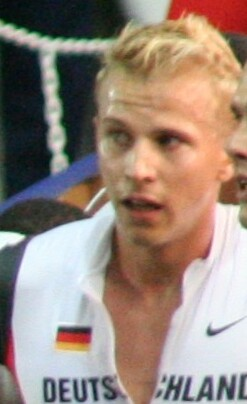
- Swillims at the 2007 World Championships

Personal information
- Born: 9 December 1982 (age 43) Dortmund, West Germany
- Height: 1.92 m (6 ft 4 in)

Sport
- Country: Germany
- Sport: Athletics
- Event: 400 metres

Achievements and titles
- Personal bests: 400 metres: 45.44 (Osaka; August 2007)

Bastian Swillims (born 9 December 1982) is a German sprinter who specialises in the 400 metres. He was born in Dortmund.

His personal best time is 45.44 seconds, achieved in August 2007 in Osaka.

== Achievements ==
Year	Competition	Venue	Position	Event	Notes
Representing Germany
2000	World Junior Championships	Santiago, Chile	12th (sf)	400m	47.43
2000	World Junior Championships	Santiago, Chile	2nd	4 × 400 m relay	3:06.79
2001	European Junior Championships	Grosseto, Italy	3rd	400 m	46.88
2002	European Championships	Munich, Germany	7th	4 × 400 m relay	3:08.56
2003	European U23 Championships	Bydgoszcz, Poland	7th	400m	46.91
2003	European U23 Championships	Bydgoszcz, Poland	2nd	4 × 400 m relay	3:03.36
2004	Olympic Games	Athens, Greece	7th	4 × 400 m relay	3:02.22
2006	European Championships	Gothenburg, Sweden	4th	4 × 400 m relay	3:02.83
2007	European Indoor Championships	Birmingham, England	2nd	400 m	45.62
