= Brice Panel =

French sprinter

Personal information
- Nationality: France
- Born: 13 June 1983 (age 43) Neuilly-sur-Seine, France
- Height: 1.77 m (5 ft 9 1/2 in)
- Weight: 68 kg (150 lb)

Sport
- Sport: Athletics
- Event: 4 × 400 metres relay
- Club: Saint-Quentin Centre Yvelines
- Coached by: Djamel Boudhebiba

Achievements and titles
- Personal best: 400 m: 45.54 s (2007)

Brice Panel (born 13 June 1983 in Neuilly-sur-Seine) is a French sprinter, who specialized in the 400 metres. He set his personal best time of 45.54 seconds by finishing second at the Resisprint meeting in La Chaux-de-Fonds.

Panel competed for the men's 4 × 400 m relay at the 2008 Summer Olympics in Beijing, along with his teammates Teddy Venel, Richard Maunier, and Ydrissa M'Barke. He ran on the starting leg of the first heat, with an individual-split time of 45.59 seconds. Panel and his team finished the relay in eighth place for a total time of 3:03.19, failing to advance into the final.

Panel is a member of Saint-Quentin Centre Yvelines Track and Field Club, and is coached and trained by Djamel Boudhebiba.
