= List of World Athletics Indoor Championships medalists (men) =

This is the complete list of men's medalists at the IAAF World Indoor Championships.

== Current program ==
=== 60 metres ===
Championships	Gold		Silver		Bronze	
1987	Lee McRae; United States	6.50 WR	Mark Witherspoon; United States	6.54 PB	Pierfrancesco Pavoni; Italy	6.59
1989	Andrés Simón; Cuba	6.52 NR	John Myles-Mills; Ghana	6.59	Pierfrancesco Pavoni; Italy	6.61
1991	Andre Cason; United States	6.54	Linford Christie; Great Britain	6.55	Chidi Imoh; Nigeria	6.60
1993	Bruny Surin; Canada	6.50 =CR	Frank Fredericks; Namibia	6.51 AR	Talal Mansour; Qatar	6.57
1995	Bruny Surin; Canada	6.46 CR	Darren Braithwaite; Great Britain	6.51 PB	Robert Esmie; Canada	6.55 PB
1997	Harálabos Papadiás; Greece	6.50 NR	Michael Green; Jamaica	6.51	Davidson Ezinwa; Nigeria	6.52 PB
1999	Maurice Greene; United States	6.42 CR	Tim Harden; United States	6.43 PB	Jason Gardener; Great Britain	6.46 AR
2001	Tim Harden; United States	6.44 SB	Tim Montgomery; United States	6.46 PB	Mark Lewis-Francis; Great Britain	6.51 WJ
2003	Justin Gatlin; United States	6.46	Kim Collins; Saint Kitts and Nevis	6.53 NR	Jason Gardener; Great Britain	6.55
2004	Jason Gardener; Great Britain	6.49	Shawn Crawford; United States	6.52	Yeóryios Theodorídis; Greece	6.54 SB
2006	Leonard Scott; United States	6.50 WL	Andrey Epishin; Russia	6.52 NR	Terrence Trammell; United States	6.54
2008	Olusoji A. Fasuba; Nigeria	6.51 WL	Dwain Chambers; Great Britain	6.54 PB	Kim Collins; Saint Kitts and Nevis	6.54 SB
2010	Dwain Chambers; Great Britain	6.48 WL	Mike Rodgers; United States	6.53	Daniel Bailey; Antigua and Barbuda	6.57
2012	Justin Gatlin; United States	6.46 SB	Nesta Carter; Jamaica	6.54	Dwain Chambers; Great Britain	6.60
2014	Richard Kilty; Great Britain	6.49 PB	Marvin Bracy; United States	6.51	Femi Ogunode; Qatar	6.52
2016	Trayvon Bromell; United States	6.47 PB	Asafa Powell; Jamaica	6.50	Ramon Gittens; Barbados	6.51 NIR
2018	Christian Coleman; United States	6.37 CR	Bingtian Su; China	6.42 AIR	Ronnie Baker; United States	6.44
2022	Marcell Jacobs; Italy	6.41 WL, AR	Christian Coleman; United States	6.41 WL	Marvin Bracy; United States	6.44 PB
2024	Christian Coleman; United States	6.41 WL	Noah Lyles; United States	6.44	Ackeem Blake; Jamaica	6.46
2025	Jeremiah Azu; Great Britain	6.49 =PB	Lachlan Kennedy; Australia	6.50	Akani Simbine; South Africa	6.54
2026	Jordan Anthony; United States	6.41 WL	Kishane Thompson; Jamaica	6.45 [.447] PB	Trayvon Bromell; United States	6.45 [.448]

=== 400 metres ===
Championships	Gold		Silver		Bronze	
1987	Antonio McKay; United States	45.98	Roberto Hernández; Cuba	46.09 NR	Michael Franks; United States	46.19
1989	Antonio McKay; United States	45.59 CR	Ian Morris; Trinidad and Tobago	46.09 NR	Cayetano Cornet; Spain	46.40
1991	Devon Morris; Jamaica	46.17 PB	Samson Kitur; Kenya	46.21 NR	Cayetano Cornet; Spain	46.52
1993	Harry Reynolds; United States	45.26 CR	Sunday Bada; Nigeria	45.75 AR	Darren Clark; Australia	46.45 AR
1995	Darnell Hall; United States	46.17	Sunday Bada; Nigeria	46.38	Mikhail Vdovin; Russia	46.65
1997	Sunday Bada; Nigeria	45.51 AR	Jamie Baulch; Great Britain	45.62	Shunji Karube; Japan	45.76 AR
1999	Jamie Baulch; Great Britain	45.73	Milton Campbell; United States	45.99	Alejandro Cárdenas; Mexico	46.02 NR
2001	Daniel Caines; Great Britain	46.40	Milton Campbell; United States	46.45	Danny McFarlane; Jamaica	46.74
2003	Tyree Washington; United States	45.34 WL	Daniel Caines; Great Britain	45.43 PB	Paul McKee; Ireland	45.99 NR
2004	Alleyne Francique; Grenada	45.88 SB	Davian Clarke; Jamaica	45.92 SB	Gary Kikaya; DR Congo	46.30 SB
2006	Alleyne Francique; Grenada	45.54 SB	California Molefe; Botswana	45.75	Chris Brown; Bahamas	45.78 NR
2008	Tyler Christopher; Canada	45.67 WL	Johan Wissman; Sweden	46.04 PB	Chris Brown; Bahamas	46.26 SB
2010	Chris Brown; Bahamas	45.96 SB	William Collazo; Cuba	46.31 PB	Jamaal Torrance; United States	46.43
2012	Nery Brenes; Costa Rica	45.11 CR	Demetrius Pinder; Bahamas	45.34 SB	Chris Brown; Bahamas	45.90 SB
2014	Pavel Maslák; Czech Republic	45.24 NIR	Chris Brown; Bahamas	45.58 PB	Kyle Clemons; United States	45.74
2016	Pavel Maslák; Czech Republic	45.44	Abdalelah Haroun; Qatar	45.59 SB	Deon Lendore; Trinidad and Tobago	46.17
2018	Pavel Maslák; Czech Republic	45.47 SB	Michael Cherry; United States	45.84	Deon Lendore; Trinidad and Tobago	46.37
2022	Jereem Richards; Trinidad and Tobago	45.00 CR, NR	Trevor Bassitt; United States	45.05 PB	Carl Bengtström; Sweden	45.33 NR
2024	Alexander Doom; Belgium	45.25 NR	Karsten Warholm; Norway	45.34	Rusheen McDonald; Jamaica	45.65 PB
2025	Christopher Bailey; United States	45.08	Brian Faust; United States	45.47 =PB	Jacory Patterson; United States	45.54
2026	Christopher Morales Williams; Canada	44.76 CR	Khaleb McRae; United States	45.03	Jereem Richards; Trinidad and Tobago	45.39 SB

=== 800 metres ===
Championships	Gold		Silver		Bronze	
1987	José Luíz Barbosa; Brazil	1:47.49 AR	Vladimir Graudyn; Soviet Union	1:47.68	Faouzi Lahbi; Morocco	1:47.79
1989	Paul Ereng; Kenya	1:44.84 WR	José Luíz Barbosa; Brazil	1:45.55 AR	Tonino Viali; Italy	1:46.95 PB
1991	Paul Ereng; Kenya	1:47.08	Tomás de Teresa; Spain	1:47.82	Simon Hoogewerf; Canada	1:47.88 NR
1993	Tom McKean; Great Britain	1:47.29	Charles Nkazamyampi; Burundi	1:47.62	Nico Motchebon; Germany	1:48.15
1995	Clive Terrelonge; Jamaica	1:47.30 NR	Benson Koech; Kenya	1:47.51	Pavel Soukup; Czech Republic	1:47.74
1997	Wilson Kipketer; Denmark	1:42.67 WR	Mahjoub Haïda; Morocco	1:45.76 NR	Rich Kenah; United States	1:46.16 PB
1999	Johan Botha; South Africa	1:45.47	Wilson Kipketer; Denmark	1:45.49	Nico Motchebon; Germany	1:45.74
2001	Yuriy Borzakovskiy; Russia	1:44.49	Johan Botha; South Africa	1:46.42	André Bucher; Switzerland	1:46.46
2003	David Krummenacker; United States	1:45.69 PB	Wilson Kipketer; Denmark	1:45.87	Wilfred Bungei; Kenya	1:46.54
2004	Mbulaeni Mulaudzi; South Africa	1:45.71	Rashid Ramzi; Bahrain	1:46.15 AR	Osmar dos Santos; Brazil	1:46.26
2006	Wilfred Bungei; Kenya	1:47.15	Mbulaeni Mulaudzi; South Africa	1:47.16	Yuriy Borzakovskiy; Russia	1:47.38
2008	Abubaker Kaki; Sudan	1:44.81 WL	Mbulaeni Mulaudzi; South Africa	1:44.91 NR	Yusuf Saad Kamel; Bahrain	1:45.26 AR
2010	Abubaker Kaki; Sudan	1:46.23 SB	Boaz Kiplagat Lalang; Kenya	1:46.39	Adam Kszczot; Poland	1:46.69
2012	Mohammed Aman; Ethiopia	1:48.36	Jakub Holuša; Czech Republic	1:48.62	Andrew Osagie; Great Britain	1:48.92
2014	Mohammed Aman; Ethiopia	1:46.40	Adam Kszczot; Poland	1:46.76	Andrew Osagie; Great Britain	1:47.10
2016	Boris Berian; United States	1:45.83 SB	Antoine Gakeme; Burundi	1:46.65 SB	Erik Sowinski; United States	1:47.22
2018	Adam Kszczot; Poland	1:47.47	Drew Windle; United States	1:47.99	Saúl Ordóñez; Spain	1:48.01
2022	Mariano García; Spain	1:46.20	Noah Kibet; Kenya	1:46.35	Bryce Hoppel; United States	1:46.51
2024	Bryce Hoppel; United States	1:44.92 WL	Andreas Kramer; Sweden	1:45.27 SB	Eliott Crestan; Belgium	1:45.32
2025	Josh Hoey; United States	1:44.77	Eliott Crestan; Belgium	1:44.81	Elvin Josué Canales; Spain	1:45.03
2026	Cooper Lutkenhaus; United States	1:44.24	Eliott Crestan; Belgium	1:44.38	Mohamed Attaoui; Spain	1:44.66

=== 1500 metres ===
Championships	Gold		Silver		Bronze	
1987	Marcus O'Sullivan; Ireland	3:39.04 PB	José Manuel Abascal; Spain	3:39.13	Han Kulker; Netherlands	3:39.51 NR
1989	Marcus O'Sullivan; Ireland	3:36.64 CR	Hauke Fuhlbrügge; East Germany	3:37.80 NR	Jeff Atkinson; United States	3:38.12 AR
1991	Noureddine Morceli; Algeria	3:41.57	Fermín Cacho; Spain	3:42.68	Mário Silva; Portugal	3:43.85
1993	Marcus O'Sullivan; Ireland	3:45.00	David Strang; Great Britain	3:45.30	Branko Zorko; Croatia	3:45.39
1995	Hicham El Guerrouj; Morocco	3:44.54	Mateo Cañellas; Spain	3:44.85	Erik Nedeau; United States	3:44.91
1997	Hicham El Guerrouj; Morocco	3:35.31 CR	Rüdiger Stenzel; Germany	3:37.24	William Tanui; Kenya	3:37.48
1999	Haile Gebrselassie; Ethiopia	3:33.77 CR	Laban Rotich; Kenya	3:33.98	Andrés Manuel Díaz; Spain	3:34.46
2001	Rui Silva; Portugal	3:51.06	Reyes Estévez; Spain	3:51.25	Noah Ngeny; Kenya	3:51.63
2003	Driss Maazouzi; France	3:42.59	Bernard Lagat; Kenya	3:42.62	Abdelkader Hachlaf; Morocco	3:42.71
2004	Paul Korir; Kenya	3:52.31	Ivan Heshko; Ukraine	3:52.34	Laban Rotich; Kenya	3:52.93
2006	Ivan Heshko; Ukraine	3:42.08	Daniel Kipchirchir Komen; Kenya	3:42.55	Elkanah Onkware Angwenyi; Kenya	3:42.98
2008	Deresse Mekonnen; Ethiopia	3:38.23	Daniel Kipchirchir Komen; Kenya	3:38.54	Juan Carlos Higuero; Spain	3:38.82
2010	Deresse Mekonnen; Ethiopia	3:41.86	Abdalaati Iguider; Morocco	3:41.96	Haron Keitany; Kenya	3:42.32
2012	Abdalaati Iguider; Morocco	3:45.21	Ilham Tanui Özbilen; Turkey	3:45.35	Mekonnen Gebremedhin; Ethiopia	3:45.90
2014	Ayanleh Souleiman; Djibouti	3:37.52	Aman Wote; Ethiopia	3:38.08	Abdalaati Iguider; Morocco	3:38.21
2016	Matthew Centrowitz; United States	3:44.22	Jakub Holuša; Czech Republic	3:44.30	Nicholas Willis; New Zealand	3:44.37
2018	Samuel Tefera; Ethiopia	3:58.19	Marcin Lewandowski; Poland	3:58.39	Abdelaati Iguider; Morocco	3:58.43
2022	Samuel Tefera; Ethiopia	3:32.77 CR	Jakob Ingebrigtsen; Norway	3:33.02	Abel Kipsang; Kenya	3:33.36 SB
2024	Geordie Beamish; New Zealand	3:36.54 PB	Cole Hocker; United States	3:36.69 PB	Hobbs Kessler; United States	3:36.72
2025	Jakob Ingebrigtsen; Norway	3:38.79	Neil Gourley; Great Britain	3:39.07	Luke Houser; United States	3:39.17
2026	Mariano García; Spain	3:39.63	Isaac Nader; Portugal	3:40.06	Adam Spencer; Australia	3:40.26

=== 3000 metres ===
Championships	Gold		Silver		Bronze	
1987	Frank O'Mara; Ireland	8:03.32	Paul Donovan; Ireland	8:03.89	Terry Brahm; United States	8:03.92
1989	Saïd Aouita; Morocco	7:47.94 CR	José Luís González; Spain	7:48.66	Dieter Baumann; West Germany	7:50.47
1991	Frank O'Mara; Ireland	7:41.14 CR	Hammou Boutayeb; Morocco	7:43.64 PB	Robert Denmark; Great Britain	7:43.90 NR
1993	Gennaro Di Napoli; Italy	7:50.26	Eric Dubus; France	7:50.57	Enrique Molina; Spain	7:51.10
1995	Gennaro Di Napoli; Italy	7:50.89	Anacleto Jiménez; Spain	7:50.98	Brahim Jabbour; Morocco	7:51.42
1997	Haile Gebrselassie; Ethiopia	7:34.71 CR	Paul Bitok; Kenya	7:38.84	Ismaïl Sghyr; Morocco	7:40.01
1999	Haile Gebrselassie; Ethiopia	7:53.57	Paul Bitok; Kenya	7:53.79	Million Wolde; Ethiopia	7:53.85
2001	Hicham El Guerrouj; Morocco	7:37.74	Mohammed Mourhit; Belgium	7:38.94 NR	Alberto García; Spain	7:39.96 PB
2003	Haile Gebrselassie; Ethiopia	7:40.97	Alberto García; Spain	7:42.08	Luke Kipkosgei; Kenya	7:42.56
2004	Bernard Lagat; Kenya	7:56.34	Rui Silva; Portugal	7:57.08	Markos Geneti; Ethiopia	7:57.87
2006	Kenenisa Bekele; Ethiopia	7:39.32	Saif Saaeed Shaheen; Qatar	7:41.28	Eliud Kipchoge; Kenya	7:42.58
2008	Tariku Bekele; Ethiopia	7:48.23	Paul Kipsiele Koech; Kenya	7:49.05	Abreham Cherkos; Ethiopia	7:49.96
2010	Bernard Lagat; United States	7:37.97 SB	Sergio Sánchez; Spain	7:39.55	Sammy Alex Mutahi; Kenya	7:39.90
2012	Bernard Lagat; United States	7:41.44 SB	Augustine Kiprono Choge; Kenya	7:41.77	Edwin Cheruiyot Soi; Kenya	7:41.78
2014	Caleb Mwangangi Ndiku; Kenya	7:54.94	Bernard Lagat; United States	7:55.22	Dejen Gebremeskel; Ethiopia	7:55.39
2016	Yomif Kejelcha; Ethiopia	7:57.21	Ryan Hill; United States	7:57.39	Augustine Kiprono Choge; Kenya	7:57.43
2018	Yomif Kejelcha; Ethiopia	8:14.41	Selemon Barega; Ethiopia	8:15.59	Bethwell Birgen; Kenya	8:15.70
2022	Selemon Barega; Ethiopia	7:41:38	Lamecha Girma; Ethiopia	7:41:63	Marc Scott; Great Britain	7:42:02 SB
2024	Josh Kerr; Great Britain	7:42.98	Yared Nuguse; United States	7:43.59	Selemon Barega; Ethiopia	7:43.64
2025	Jakob Ingebrigtsen; Norway	7:46.09 SB	Berihu Aregawi; Ethiopia	7:46.25 SB	Ky Robinson; Australia	7:47.09
2026	Josh Kerr; Great Britain	7:35.56 SB	Cole Hocker; United States	7:35.70 SB	Yann Schrub; France	7:35.71

=== 60 metres hurdles ===
Championships	Gold		Silver		Bronze	
1987	Tonie Campbell; United States	7.51 PB	Stéphane Caristan; France	7.62	Nigel Walker; Great Britain	7.66
1989	Roger Kingdom; United States	7.43 CR	Colin Jackson; Great Britain	7.45	Igors Kazanovs; Soviet Union	7.59
1991	Greg Foster; United States	7.45	Igors Kazanovs; Soviet Union	7.47	Mark McKoy; Canada	7.49
1993	Mark McKoy; Canada	7.41 CR	Colin Jackson; Great Britain	7.43	Tony Dees; United States	7.43 PB
1995	Allen Johnson; United States	7.39 CR	Courtney Hawkins; United States	7.41 PB	Tony Jarrett; Great Britain	7.42 PB
1997	Anier García; Cuba	7.48 =NR	Colin Jackson; Great Britain	7.49	Tony Dees; United States	7.50 SB
1999	Colin Jackson; Great Britain	7.38 CR	Reggie Torian; United States	7.40	Falk Balzer; Germany	7.44
2001	Terrence Trammell; United States	7.51	Anier García; Cuba	7.54 SB	Shaun Bownes; South Africa	7.55
2003	Allen Johnson; United States	7.47	Anier García; Cuba	7.49	Xiang Liu; China	7.52
2004	Allen Johnson; United States	7.36 CR	Xiang Liu; China	7.43 AR	Maurice Wignall; Jamaica	7.48 NR
2006	Terrence Trammell; United States	7.43 WL	Dayron Robles; Cuba	7.46 PB	Dominique Arnold; United States	7.52
2008	Xiang Liu; China	7.46 SB	Allen Johnson; United States	7.55	Evgeniy Borisov; Russia	7.60
2010	Dayron Robles; Cuba	7.34 CR	Terrence Trammell; United States	7.36 NR	David Oliver; United States	7.44 PB
2012	Aries Merritt; United States	7.44	Xiang Liu; China	7.49	Pascal Martinot-Lagarde; France	7.53 PB
2014	Omo Osaghae; United States	7.45 WL	Pascal Martinot-Lagarde; France	7.46	Garfield Darien; France	7.47 PB
2016	Omar McLeod; Jamaica	7.41 WL	Pascal Martinot-Lagarde; France	7.46 SB	Dimitri Bascou; France	7.48
2018	Andrew Pozzi; Great Britain	7.46 SB	Jarret Eaton; United States	7.47	Aurel Manga; France	7.54
2022	Grant Holloway; United States	7.39	Pascal Martinot-Lagarde; France	7.50	Jarret Eaton; United States	7.53
2024	Grant Holloway; United States	7.29 =CR	Lorenzo Simonelli; Italy	7.43 NR	Just Kwaou-Mathey; France	7.47
2025	Grant Holloway; United States	7.42	Wilhem Belocian; France	7.54	Liu Junxi; China	7.55
2026	Jakub Szymański; Poland	7.40	Enrique Llopis; Spain	7.42 NR	Trey Cunningham; United States	7.43

=== 4 × 400 metres relay ===
Championships	Gold		Silver		Bronze	
1991	Germany (GER); Rico Lieder, Jens Carlowitz, Karsten Just, Thomas Schönlebe	3:03.05 WR	United States (USA); Raymond Pierre, Charles Jenkins, Andrew Valmon, Antonio McKay, Clifton Campbell, Willie Smith	3:03.24 AR	Italy (ITA); Marco Vaccari, Vito Petrella, Alessandro Aimar, Andrea Nuti	3:05.51 NR
1993	United States (USA); Darnell Hall; Brian Irvin; Jason Rouser; Mark Everett	3:04.20	Trinidad and Tobago (TTO); Dazel Jules; Alvin Daniel; Neil de Silva; Ian Morris	3:07.02 NR	Japan (JPN); Masayoshi Kan; Seiji Inagaki; Yoshihiko Saito; Hiroyuki Hayashi	3:07.30
1995	United States (USA); Rod Tolbert; Calvin Davis; Tod Long; Frankie Atwater	3:07.37	Italy (ITA); Fabio Grossi; Andrea Nuti; Roberto Mazzoleni; Ashraf Saber	3:09.12	Japan (JPN); Masayoshi Kan; Seiji Inagaki; Tomonari Ono; Hiroyuki Hayashi	3:09.73
1997	United States (USA); Jason Rouser; Mark Everett; Sean Maye; Deon Minor	3:04.93 WL	Jamaica (JAM); Linval Laird; Michael McDonald; Dinsdale Morgan; Gregory Haughton	3:08.11	France (FRA); Pierre-Marie Hilaire; Rodrigue Nordin; Loïc Lerouge; Fred Mango	3:09.68
1999	United States (USA); Andre Morris; Dameon Johnson; Deon Minor; Milton Campbell	3:02.83 WR	Poland (POL); Piotr Haczek; Jacek Bocian; Piotr Rysiukiewicz; Robert Maćkowiak	3:03.01 AR	Great Britain (GBR); Allyn Condon; Solomon Wariso; Adrian Patrick; Jamie Baulch	3:03.20 NR
2001	Poland (POL); Piotr Rysiukiewicz; Piotr Haczek; Jacek Bocian; Robert Maćkowiak	3:04.47 WL	Russia (RUS); Aleksandr Ladeyshchikov; Ruslan Mashchenko; Boris Gorban; Andrey Semyonov; Dmitriy Forshev*	3:04.82 NR	Jamaica (JAM); Michael McDonald; Davian Clarke; Michael Blackwood; Danny McFarlane; Gregory Haughton*	3:05.45
2003	Jamaica (JAM); Leroy Colquhoun; Danny McFarlane; Michael Blackwood; Davian Clarke; Kemel Thompson*	3:04.21 NR	Great Britain (GBR); Jamie Baulch; Timothy Benjamin; Cori Henry; Daniel Caines; Mark Hylton*; Jared Deacon*	3:06.12 SB	Poland (POL); Rafał Wieruszewski; Grzegorz Zajączkowski; Marcin Marciniszyn; Marek Plawgo; Artur Gąsiewski*; Piotr Rysiukiewicz*	3:06.61 SB
2004	Jamaica (JAM); Gregory Haughton; Leroy Colquhoun; Michael McDonald; Davian Clarke; Richard James*; Sanjay Ayre*	3:05.21 WL	Russia (RUS); Dmitriy Forshev; Boris Gorban; Andrey Rudnitskiy; Aleksandr Usov	3:06.23 SB	Ireland (IRL); Robert Daly; Gary Ryan; David Gillick; David McCarthy	3:10.44
2006	United States (USA); Tyree Washington; LaShawn Merritt; Milton Campbell; Wallace Spearmon; James Davis*; O.J. Hogans*	3:03.24	Poland (POL); Daniel Dąbrowski; Marcin Marciniszyn; Rafał Wieruszewski; Piotr Klimczak; Paweł Ptak*; Piotr Kędzia*	3:04.67 SB	Russia (RUS); Konstantin Svechkar; Aleksandr Derevyagin; Yevgeniy Lebedev; Dmitriy Petrov; Andrey Polukeyev*	3:06.91 SB
2008	United States (USA); James Davis; Jamaal Torrance; Greg Nixon; Kelly Willie; Joel Stallworth*	3:06.79 WL	Jamaica (JAM); Michael Blackwood; Edino Steele; Adrian Findlay; DeWayne Barrett; Aldwyn Sappleton*	3:07.69 SB	Dominican Republic (DOM); Arismendy Peguero; Carlos Santa; Pedro Mejía; Yoel Tapia	3:07.77 NR
2010	United States (USA); Jamaal Torrance; Greg Nixon; Tavaris Tate; Bershawn Jackson; LeJerald Betters*; Kerron Clement*	3:03.40 WL	Belgium (BEL); Cedric van Branteghem; Kevin Borlée; Antoine Gillet; Jonathan Borlée; Nils Duerinck*	3:06.94 NR	Great Britain (GBR); Conrad Williams; Nigel Levine; Christopher Clarke; Richard Buck; Luke Lennon-Ford*	3:07.52 SB
2012	United States (USA); Frankie Wright; Calvin Smith Jr. Manteo Mitchell; Gil Roberts; Jamaal Torrance*; Quentin Iglehart-Summers*	3:03.94 SB	Great Britain (GBR); Conrad Williams; Nigel Levine; Michael Bingham; Richard Buck; Luke Lennon-Ford*	3:04.72 SB	Trinidad and Tobago (TTO); Lalonde Gordon; Renny Quow; Jereem Richards; Jarrin Solomon	3:06.85 NR
2014	United States (USA); Kyle Clemons; David Verburg; Kind Butler III; Calvin Smith Jr. Clayton Parros*; Ricky Babineaux*	3:02.13 WR	Great Britain (GBR); Conrad Williams; Jamie Bowie; Luke Lennon-Ford; Nigel Levine; Michael Bingham*	3:03.49 SB	Jamaica (JAM); Errol Nolan; Allodin Fothergill; Akheem Gauntlett; Edino Steele; Dane Hyatt*; Jermaine Brown*	3:03.69 NR
2016	United States (USA); Kyle Clemons; Calvin Smith; Christopher Giesting; Vernon Norwood; Elvyonn Bailey*; Patrick Feeney*	3:02.45 WL	Bahamas (BAH); Michael Mathieu; Alonzo Russell; Shavez Hart; Chris Brown; Ashley Riley*	3:04.75 NR	Trinidad and Tobago (TTO); Jarrin Solomon; Lalonde Gordon; Ade Alleyne-Forte; Deon Lendore; Rondel Sorrillo*; Machel Cedenio*	3:05.51 NR
2018	Poland (POL); Karol Zalewski; Rafał Omelko; Łukasz Krawczuk; Jakub Krzewina; Patryk Adamczyk*	3:01.77 WR	United States (USA); Fred Kerley; Michael Cherry; Aldrich Bailey; Vernon Norwood; Marqueze Washington*; Paul Dedewo*	3:01.97 SB	Belgium (BEL); Dylan Borlée; Jonathan Borlée; Jonathan Sacoor; Kevin Borlée	3:02.51 NR
2022	Belgium (BEL); Julien Watrin; Alexander Doom; Jonathan Sacoor; Kevin Borlée; Dylan Borlée	3:06.52 SB	Spain (ESP); Bruno Hortelano; Iñaki Cañal; Manuel Guijarro; Bernat Erta	3:06.82 SB	Netherlands (NED); Taymir Burnet; Nick Smidt; Terrence Agard; Tony van Diepen; Isayah Boers; Jochem Dobber	3:06.90 SB
2024	Belgium (BEL); Jonathan Sacoor; Dylan Borlée; Christian Iguacel; Alexander Doom; Tibo De Smet	3:02.54 WL	United States (USA); Jacory Patterson; Matthew Boling; Noah Lyles; Christopher Bailey; Paul Dedewo; Trevor Bassitt	3:02.60 SB	Netherlands (NED); Liemarvin Bonevacia; Ramsey Angela; Terrence Agard; Tony van Diepen; Taymir Burnet; Isaya Klein Ikkink	3:04.25 NR
2025	United States; Elija Godwin; Brian Faust; Jacory Patterson; Christopher Bailey	3:03.13 SB	Jamaica; Rusheen McDonald; Jasauna Dennis; Kimar Farquharson; Demar Francis	3:05.05 SB	Hungary; Patrik Simon Enyingi; Zoltán Wahl; Árpád Kovács; Attila Molnár	3:06.03 NR
2026	United States; Justin Robinson; Chris Robinson; Demarius Smith; Khaleb McRae; Elija Godwin*; TJ Tomlyanovich*	3:01.52 CR	Belgium; Jonathan Sacoor; Christian Iguacel; Julien Watrin; Alexander Doom; Robin Vanderbemden*; Dylan Borlee*	3:03.29 SB	Jamaica; Reheem Hayles; Delano Kennedy; Tyrice Taylor; Kimar Farquharson; Demar Francis*	3:05.99

=== High jump ===
Championships	Gold		Silver		Bronze	
1987	Igor Paklin; Soviet Union	2.38 NR	Gennadiy Avdeyenko; Soviet Union	2.38 NR	Ján Zvara; Czechoslovakia	2.34
1989	Javier Sotomayor; Cuba	2.43 WR	Dietmar Mögenburg; West Germany	2.35	Patrik Sjöberg; Sweden	2.35
1991	Hollis Conway; United States	2.40 NR	Artur Partyka; Poland	2.37 =NR	Javier Sotomayor; Cuba	2.31
1993	Javier Sotomayor; Cuba	2.41	Patrik Sjöberg; Sweden	2.39	Steve Smith; Great Britain	2.37 NR
1995	Javier Sotomayor; Cuba	2.38	Lábros Papakóstas; Greece	2.35 NR	Tony Barton; United States	2.32 PB
1997	Charles Austin; United States	2.35	Lábros Papakóstas; Greece	2.32 SB	Dragutin Topić; Serbia and Montenegro	2.32
1999	Javier Sotomayor; Cuba	2.36 WL	Vyacheslav Voronin; Russia	2.36 WL	Charles Austin; United States	2.33 SB
2001	Stefan Holm; Sweden	2.32	Andriy Sokolovskyy; Ukraine	2.29	Staffan Strand; Sweden	2.29
2003	Stefan Holm; Sweden	2.35	Yaroslav Rybakov; Russia	2.33	Hennazdy Maroz; Belarus	2.30 PB
2004	Stefan Holm; Sweden	2.35	Yaroslav Rybakov; Russia	2.32 SB	Germaine Mason; Jamaica	2.25
2006	Yaroslav Rybakov; Russia	2.37 WL	Andrey Tereshin; Russia	2.35	Linus Thörnblad; Sweden	2.33
2008	Stefan Holm; Sweden	2.36	Yaroslav Rybakov; Russia	2.34	Andra Manson; United States	2.30 SB
2010	Ivan Ukhov; Russia	2.36	Yaroslav Rybakov; Russia	2.31	Dusty Jonas; United States	2.31
2012	Dimítrios Chondrokoúkis; Greece	2.33 PB	Andrey Silnov; Russia	2.33	Ivan Ukhov; Russia	2.31
2014	Mutaz Essa Barshim; Qatar	2.38 AR	Ivan Ukhov; Russia	2.38	Andriy Protsenko; Ukraine	2.36 PB
2016	Gianmarco Tamberi; Italy	2.36	Robert Grabarz; Great Britain	2.33 SB	Erik Kynard; United States	2.33 SB
2018	Danil Lysenko; Authorised Neutral Athletes	2.36	Mutaz Essa Barshim; Qatar	2.33	Mateusz Przybylko; Germany	2.29
2022	Woo Sang-hyeok; South Korea	2.34 m	Loïc Gasch; Switzerland	2.31 m SB	Hamish Kerr; New Zealand	2.31 m NR
2022	Woo Sang-hyeok; South Korea	2.34 m	Loïc Gasch; Switzerland	2.31 m SB	Gianmarco Tamberi; Italy	2.31 m SB
2024	Hamish Kerr; New Zealand	2.36 WL, AR	Shelby McEwen; United States	2.28	Woo Sang-hyeok; South Korea	2.28
2025	Woo Sang-hyeok; South Korea	2.31 m =SB	Hamish Kerr; New Zealand	2.28 m	Raymond Richards; Jamaica	2.28 m
2026	Oleh Doroshchuk; Ukraine	2.30 m SB	Erick Portillo; Mexico	2.30 m PB	Raymond Richards; Jamaica Woo Sang-hyeok; South Korea	2.26 m =SB 2.26 m

=== Pole vault ===
Championships	Gold		Silver		Bronze	
1987	Sergei Bubka; Soviet Union	5.85	Earl Bell; United States	5.80	Thierry Vigneron; France	5.80
1989	Radion Gataullin; Soviet Union	5.85	Grigoriy Yegorov; Soviet Union	5.80 PB	Joe Dial; United States	5.70
1991	Sergei Bubka; Soviet Union	6.00 CR	Viktor Ryzhenkov; Soviet Union	5.80	Ferenc Salbert; France	5.70
1993	Radion Gataullin; Russia	5.90	Grigoriy Yegorov; Kazakhstan	5.80	Jean Galfione; France	5.80
1995	Sergei Bubka; Ukraine	5.90	Igor Potapovich; Kazakhstan	5.80	Okkert Brits; South Africa	5.75
1997	Igor Potapovich; Kazakhstan	5.90	Lawrence Johnson; United States	5.85	Maksim Tarasov; Russia	5.80
1999	Jean Galfione; France	6.00 CR	Jeff Hartwig; United States	5.95 AR	Danny Ecker; Germany	5.85
2001	Lawrence Johnson; United States	5.95	Tye Harvey; United States	5.90	Romain Mesnil; France	5.85
2003	Tim Lobinger; Germany	5.80	Michael Stolle; Germany	5.75 SB	Rens Blom; Netherlands	5.75 NR
2004	Igor Pavlov; Russia	5.80 PB	Adam Ptácek; Czech Republic	5.70 SB	Denys Yurchenko; Ukraine	5.70
2006	Brad Walker; United States	5.80 SB	Alhaji Jeng; Sweden	5.70	Tim Lobinger; Germany	5.60
2008	Evgeniy Lukyanenko; Russia	5.90 WL	Brad Walker; United States	5.85 PB	Steven Hooker; Australia	5.80 SB
2010	Steven Hooker; Australia	6.01 CR	Malte Mohr; Germany	5.70	Alexander Straub; Germany	5.65
2012	Renaud Lavillenie; France	5.95 WL	Björn Otto; Germany	5.80	Brad Walker; United States	5.80
2014	Konstadínos Filippídis; Greece	5.80 SB	Malte Mohr; Germany	5.80	Jan Kudlička; Czech Republic	5.80 PB
2016	Renaud Lavillenie; France	6.02 CR	Sam Kendricks; United States	5.80	Piotr Lisek; Poland	5.75
2018	Renaud Lavillenie; France	5.90	Sam Kendricks; United States	5.85	Piotr Lisek; Poland	5.85
2022	Armand Duplantis; Sweden	6.20 m WR	Thiago Braz; Brazil	5.95 m AR	Christopher Nilsen; United States	5.90 m
2024	Armand Duplantis; Sweden	6.05 m	Sam Kendricks; United States	5.90	Emmanouil Karalis; Greece	5.85 m
2025	Armand Duplantis; Sweden	6.15 m	Emmanouil Karalis; Greece	6.05 m NR	Sam Kendricks; United States	5.90 m =SB
2026	Armand Duplantis; Sweden	6.25 m CR	Emmanouil Karalis; Greece	6.05 m	Kurtis Marschall; Australia	6.00 m =PB

=== Long jump ===
Championships	Gold		Silver		Bronze	
1987	Larry Myricks; United States	8.23	Paul Emordi; Nigeria	8.01	Giovanni Evangelisti; Italy	8.01
1989	Larry Myricks; United States	8.37 CR	Dietmar Haaf; West Germany	8.17	Mike Conley; United States	8.11
1991	Dietmar Haaf; Germany	8.15	Jaime Jefferson; Cuba	8.04	Giovanni Evangelisti; Italy	7.93
1993	Iván Pedroso; Cuba	8.23 NR	Joe Greene; United States	8.13	Jaime Jefferson; Cuba	7.98
1995	Iván Pedroso; Cuba	8.51 CR	Mattias Sunneborn; Sweden	8.20 NR	Erick Walder; United States	8.14
1997	Iván Pedroso; Cuba	8.51 =CR	Kirill Sosunov; Russia	8.41 PB	Joe Greene; United States	8.41 PB
1999	Iván Pedroso; Cuba	8.62 CR	Yago Lamela; Spain	8.56 AR	Erick Walder; United States	8.30
2001	Iván Pedroso; Cuba	8.43 WL	Kareem Streete-Thompson; Cayman Islands	8.16 NR	Carlos Calado; Portugal	8.16 NR
2003	Dwight Phillips; United States	8.29 PB	Yago Lamela; Spain	8.28	Miguel Pate; United States	8.21
2004	Savanté Stringfellow; United States	8.40	James Beckford; Jamaica	8.31 SB	Vitaliy Shkurlatov; Russia	8.28 SB
2006	Ignisious Gaisah; Ghana	8.30	Irving Saladino; Panama	8.29 AR	Andrew Howe; Italy	8.19 PB
2008	Godfrey Khotso Mokoena; South Africa	8.08 SB	Christopher Tomlinson; Great Britain	8.06	Mohamed Salman Al Khuwalidi; Saudi Arabia	8.01
2010	Fabrice Lapierre; Australia	8.17	Godfrey Khotso Mokoena; South Africa	8.08 SB	Mitchell Watt; Australia	8.05
2012	Mauro Vinícius da Silva; Brazil	8.23	Henry Frayne; Australia	8.23 AR	Aleksandr Menkov; Russia	8.22
2014	Mauro Vinícius da Silva; Brazil	8.28 NIR	Jinzhe Li; China	8.23 SB	Michel Tornéus; Sweden	8.21 SB
2016	Marquis Dendy; United States	8.26	Fabrice Lapierre; Australia	8.25 AIR	Changzhou Huang; China	8.21 PB
2018	Juan Miguel Echevarría; Cuba	8.46 WL	Luvo Manyonga; South Africa	8.44 AIR	Marquis Dendy; United States	8.42 PB
2022	Miltiadis Tentoglou; Greece	8.55 m WL	Thobias Montler; Sweden	8.38 m NR	Marquis Dendy; United States	8.27 m SB
2024	Miltiadis Tentoglou; Greece	8.22 m	Mattia Furlani; Italy	8.22 m	Carey McLeod; Jamaica	8.21 m
2025	Mattia Furlani; Italy	8.30 m	Wayne Pinnock; Jamaica	8.29 m SB	Liam Adcock; Australia	8.28 m
2026	Gerson Baldé; Portugal	8.46 m WL	Mattia Furlani; Italy	8.39 m =PB	Bozhidar Sarâboyukov; Bulgaria	8.31 m

=== Triple jump ===
Championships	Gold		Silver		Bronze	
1987	Mike Conley; United States	17.54	Oleg Protsenko; Soviet Union	17.26	Frank Rutherford; Bahamas	17.02
1989	Mike Conley; United States	17.65 CR	Jorge Reyna; Cuba	17.41 NR	Juan Miguel López; Cuba	17.28 PB
1991	Igor Lapshin; Soviet Union	17.31	Leonid Voloshin; Soviet Union	17.04	Tord Henriksson; Sweden	16.80
1993	Pierre Camara; France	17.59 NR	Māris Bružiks; Latvia	17.36	Brian Wellman; Bermuda	17.27 NR
1995	Brian Wellman; Bermuda	17.72 CR	Yoelbi Quesada; Cuba	17.62 NR	Serge Hélan; France	17.06
1997	Yoel García; Cuba	17.30 Q	Aliecer Urrutia; Cuba	17.27 Q	Aleksandr Aseledchenko; Russia	17.22 Q PB
1999	Charles Michael Friedek; Germany	17.18 PB	LaMark Carter; United States	16.98 SB	Zsolt Czingler; Hungary	16.98
2001	Paolo Camossi; Italy	17.32 NR	Jonathan Edwards; Great Britain	17.26	Andrew Murphy; Australia	17.20 AR
2003	Christian Olsson; Sweden	17.70 WL	Walter Davis; United States	17.35 PB	Yoelbi Quesada; Cuba	17.27 SB
2004	Christian Olsson; Sweden	17.83 WR	Jadel Gregório; Brazil	17.43	Yoandris Betanzos; Cuba	17.36
2006	Walter Davis; United States	17.73 PB	Jadel Gregório; Brazil	17.56 AR	Yoandris Betanzos; Cuba	17.42 PB
2008	Phillips Idowu; Great Britain	17.75 WL	Arnie David Giralt; Cuba	17.47 PB	Nelson Évora; Portugal	17.27
2010	Teddy Tamgho; France	17.90 WR	Yoandris Betanzos; Cuba	17.69 PB	Arnie David Giralt; Cuba	17.36 SB
2012	Will Claye; United States	17.70 WL	Christian Taylor; United States	17.63 SB	Lyukman Adams; Russia	17.36 PB
2014	Lyukman Adams; Russia	17.37 WL	Ernesto Revé; Cuba	17.33	Pedro Pablo Pichardo; Cuba	17.24
2016	Bin Dong; China	17.33	Max Hess; Germany	17.14 PB	Benjamin Compaoré; France	17.09 SB
2018	Will Claye; United States	17.43 WL	Almir dos Santos; Brazil	17.41 PB	Nelson Évora; Portugal	17.40 NIR
2022	Lázaro Martínez; Cuba	17.64 m WL	Pedro Pichardo; Portugal	17.46 m NR	Donald Scott; United States	17.21 m SB
2024	Hugues Fabrice Zango; Burkina Faso	17.53 m	Yasser Triki; Algeria	17.35 m	Tiago Pereira; Portugal	17.08 m
2025	Andy Díaz; Italy	17.80 m WL	Zhu Yaming; China	17.33 m SB	Hugues Fabrice Zango; Burkina Faso	17.15 m SB
2026	Andy Díaz; Italy	17.47 m WL	Jordan Scott; Jamaica	17.33 m	Yasser Triki; Algeria	17.30 m

=== Shot put ===
Championships	Gold		Silver		Bronze	
1987	Ulf Timmermann; East Germany	22.24 NR	Werner Günthör; Switzerland	21.61	Sergey Smirnov; Soviet Union	20.67
1989	Ulf Timmermann; East Germany	21.75	Randy Barnes; United States	21.28	Georg Andersen; Norway	20.98 NR
1991	Werner Günthör; Switzerland	21.17	Klaus Bodenmüller; Austria	20.42	Ron Backes; United States	20.06
1993	Mike Stulce; United States	21.27	Jim Doehring; United States	21.08	Oleksandr Bagach; Ukraine	20.63
1995	Mika Halvari; Finland	20.74	C. J. Hunter; United States	20.58	Dragan Perić; Serbia and Montenegro	20.36
1997	Yuriy Bilonoh; Ukraine	21.02 PB	Oleksandr Bagach; Ukraine	20.94 SB	John Godina; United States	20.87
1999	Oleksandr Bagach; Ukraine	21.41	John Godina; United States	21.06 SB	Yuriy Bilonoh; Ukraine	20.89 SB
2001	John Godina; United States	20.82 SB	Adam Nelson; United States	20.72	Manuel Martínez; Spain	20.67
2003	Manuel Martínez; Spain	21.24 SB	John Godina; United States	21.23 SB	Yuriy Bilonoh; Ukraine	21.13
2004	Christian Cantwell; United States	21.49	Reese Hoffa; United States	21.07 PB	Joachim Olsen; Denmark	20.99
2006	Reese Hoffa; United States	22.11 WL	Joachim Olsen; Denmark	21.16	Pavel Sofin; Russia	20.68 PB
2008	Christian Cantwell; United States	21.77	Reese Hoffa; United States	21.20	Tomasz Majewski; Poland	20.93 NR
2010	Christian Cantwell; United States	21.83	Ralf Bartels; Germany	21.44 PB	Dylan Armstrong; Canada	21.39 NR
2012	Ryan Whiting; United States	22.00 WL	David Storl; Germany	21.88 PB	Tomasz Majewski; Poland	21.72 NR
2014	Ryan Whiting; United States	22.05	David Storl; Germany	21.79 SB	Tomas Walsh; New Zealand	21.26 AIR
2016	Tomas Walsh; New Zealand	21.78 WL	Andrei Gag; Romania	20.89 SB	Filip Mihaljevic; Croatia	20.87 PB
2018	Tomas Walsh; New Zealand	22.31 CR	David Storl; Germany	21.44 SB	Tomáš Staněk; Czech Republic	21.44
2022	Darlan Romani; Brazil	22.53 m CR, AR	Ryan Crouser; United States	22.44 m	Tomas Walsh; New Zealand	22.31 m AR
2024	Ryan Crouser; United States	22.69 m CR	Tomas Walsh; New Zealand	22.07 m	Leonardo Fabbri; Italy	21.96 m
2025	Tomas Walsh; New Zealand	21.65 m SB	Roger Steen; United States	21.62 m SB	Adrian Piperi; United States	21.48 m
2026	Tomas Walsh; New Zealand	21.82 m SB	Jordan Geist; United States	21.64 m	Roger Steen; United States	21.49 m

=== Heptathlon ===
Championships	Gold		Silver		Bronze	
1993	Dan O'Brien; United States	6476 WR	Mike Smith; Canada	6279 NR	Eduard Hämäläinen; Belarus	6075
1995	Christian Plaziat; France	6246	Tomáš Dvořák; Czech Republic	6169 NR	Henrik Dagård; Sweden	6142 NR
1997	Robert Zmelik; Czech Republic	6228	Erki Nool; Estonia	6213 PB	Jón Arnar Magnússon; Iceland	6145 NR
1999	Sebastian Chmara; Poland	6386 WL	Erki Nool; Estonia	6374 NR	Roman Šebrle; Czech Republic	6319 NR
2001	Roman Šebrle; Czech Republic	6420 WL	Jón Arnar Magnússon; Iceland	6233 SB	Lev Lobodin; Russia	6202 SB
2003	Tom Pappas; United States	6361 PB	Lev Lobodin; Russia	6297	Roman Šebrle; Czech Republic	6196
2004	Roman Šebrle; Czech Republic	6438 WL	Bryan Clay; United States	6365 PB	Lev Lobodin; Russia	6203 SB
2006	André Niklaus; Germany	6192 PB	Bryan Clay; United States	6187 SB	Roman Šebrle; Czech Republic	6161 SB
2008	Bryan Clay; United States	6371 WL	Andrei Krauchanka; Belarus	6234 NR	Dmitriy Karpov; Kazakhstan	6131
2010	Bryan Clay; United States	6204 SB	Trey Hardee; United States	6184 SB	Aleksey Drozdov; Russia	6141
2012	Ashton Eaton; United States	6645 WR	Oleksiy Kasyanov; Ukraine	6071	Artem Lukyanenko; Russia	5969
2014	Ashton Eaton; United States	6632 WL	Andrei Krauchanka; Belarus	6303 NIR	Thomas van der Plaetsen; Belgium	6259 NIR
2016	Ashton Eaton; United States	6470 WL	Oleksiy Kasyanov; Ukraine	6182 SB	Mathias Brugger; Germany	6126 PB
2018	Kevin Mayer; France	6348 WL	Damian Warner; Canada	6343 NIR	Maicel Uibo; Estonia	6265 PB
2022	Damian Warner; Canada	6489 pts WL	Simon Ehammer; Switzerland	6363 pts NR	Ashley Moloney; Australia	6344 pts AR
2024	Simon Ehammer; Switzerland	6418 pts WL, NR	Sander Skotheim; Norway	6407 pts NR	Johannes Erm; Estonia	6340 pts PB
2025	Sander Skotheim; Norway	6475 pts	Johannes Erm; Estonia	6437 pts NR	Till Steinforth; Germany	6275 pts
2026	Simon Ehammer; Switzerland	6670 WR	Heath Baldwin; United States	6337 PB	Kyle Garland; United States	6245 SB

== Discontinued events ==
=== 200 metres ===
Championships	Gold		Silver		Bronze	
1987	Kirk Baptiste; United States	20.73 PB	Bruno Marie-Rose; France	20.89	Robson da Silva; Brazil	20.92
1989	John Regis; Great Britain	20.54 CR	Ade Mafe; Great Britain	20.87	Kevin Little; United States	21.12
1991	Nikolay Antonov; Bulgaria	20.67	Linford Christie; Great Britain	20.72	Ade Mafe; Great Britain	20.92
1993	James Trapp; United States	20.63	Damien Marsh; Australia	20.71 AR	Kevin Little; United States	20.72
1995	Geir Moen; Norway	20.58	Troy Douglas; Bermuda	20.94	Sebastián Keitel; Chile	20.98
1997	Kevin Little; United States	20.40 CR	Iván García; Cuba	20.46 PB	Francis Obikwelu; Nigeria	21.10
1999	Frank Fredericks; Namibia	20.10 CR	Obadele Thompson; Barbados	20.26 AR	Kevin Little; United States	20.48
2001	Shawn Crawford; United States	20.63	Christian Malcolm; Great Britain	20.76	Patrick van Balkom; Netherlands	20.96
2003	Marlon Devonish; Great Britain	20.62	Joseph Batangdon; Cameroon	20.76	Dominic Demeritte; Bahamas	20.92
2004	Dominic Demeritte; Bahamas	20.66 NR	Johan Wissman; Sweden	20.72	Tobias Unger; Germany	21.02

=== 5000 metres walk ===
Championships	Gold		Silver		Bronze	
1987	Mikhail Shchennikov; Soviet Union	18:27.79 CR	Jozef Pribilinec; Czechoslovakia	18:27.80	Ernesto Canto; Mexico	18:38.71
1989	Mikhail Shchennikov; Soviet Union	18:27.10 CR	Roman Mrázek; Czechoslovakia	18:28.90	Frants Kostyukevich; Soviet Union	18:34.07
1991	Mikhail Shchennikov; Soviet Union	18:23.55 CR	Giovanni De Benedictis; Italy	18:23.60	Frants Kostyukevich; Soviet Union	18:47.05
1993	Mikhail Shchennikov; Russia	18:32.10	Robert Korzeniowski; Poland	18:35.91	Mikhail Orlov; Russia	18:43.48
