= 2008 IAAF World Indoor Championships – Men's 4 × 400 metres relay =

The men's 4 × 400 metres relay at the 2008 IAAF World Indoor Championships took place on March 9, 2008.

== Medalists ==
Gold	Silver	Bronze
United States; James Davis; Jamaal Torrance; Greg Nixon; Kelly Willie	Jamaica; Michael Blackwood; Edino Steele; Adrian Findlay; DeWayne Barrett	Dominican Republic; Arismendy Peguero; Carlos Santa; Pedro Mejía; Yoel Tapia

== Results ==
=== Heats ===
Qualification: First 2 of each heat (Q) plus the 2 fastest times (q) advance to the final.

Rank	Heat	Nation	Athletes	Time	Notes
1	1	United States	James Davis, Kelly Willie, Joel Stallworth, Jamaal Torrance	3:08.07	Q
2	1	Russia	Denis Alekseyev, Vladislav Frolov, Ivan Buzolin, Anton Kokorin	3:08.17	Q, SB
3	1	Great Britain	Steven Green, Richard Buck, Dale Garland, Robert Tobin	3:08.21	q, SB
4	2	Dominican Republic	Carlos Santa, Arismendy Peguero, Pedro Mejía, Yoel Tapia	3:09.77	Q, SB
5	2	Poland	Piotr Kędzia, Piotr Klimczak, Grzegorz Zajączkowski, Wojciech Chybiński	3:09.81	Q, SB
6	2	Jamaica	Michael Blackwood, Edino Steele, Aldwyn Sappleton, Adrian Findlay	3:09.81	q, SB
7	2	Spain	Mark Ujakpor, Antonio Manuel Reina, Luis Flores, Marc Orozco	3:09.93	SB
8	1	Bahamas	Andrae Williams, Nathaniel McKinney, Douglas Lynes-Bell, Michael Mathieu	3:11.77	SB
9	1	Liberia	Bobby Young, Hafiz Greigre, Marvin Lewis, Siraj Williams	3:12.14	PB
10	2	Australia	Daniel Batman, Joel Milburn, Mark Ormrod, Dylan Grant	3:12.69	SB

=== Final ===
The final was started at 19:06 on March 9.

Rank	Lane	Nation	Athletes	Time	Notes
1st place, gold medalist(s)	5	United States	James Davis, Jamaal Torrance, Greg Nixon, Kelly Willie	3:06.79	WL
2nd place, silver medalist(s)	2	Jamaica	Michael Blackwood, Edino Steele, Adrian Findlay, DeWayne Barrett	3:07.69	SB
3rd place, bronze medalist(s)	6	Dominican Republic	Arismendy Peguero, Carlos Santa, Pedro Mejía, Yoel Tapia	3:07.77	NIR
4	3	Poland	Piotr Kędzia, Piotr Klimczak, Wojciech Chybiński, Grzegorz Sobiński	3:08.76	SB
5	1	Great Britain	Steven Green, Richard Buck, Dale Garland, Robert Tobin	3:09.21	
6	4	Russia	Denis Alekseyev, Anton Kokorin, Maksim Dyldin, Yuriy Borzakovskiy	3:15.38	
