= Athletics at the 2007 Pan American Games – Men's 4 × 400 metres relay =

Men's 4 × 400 metres relay at the Pan American Games

The men's 4 × 400 metres relay at the 2007 Pan American Games was held on July 27–28.

== Medalists ==
Gold	Silver	Bronze
Bahamas; Andrae Williams; Avard Moncur; Michael Mathieu; Chris Brown; Andretti Bain*; Nathaniel McKinney*	United States; Greg Nixon; Jamaal Torrance; LaRon Bennett; David Neville; Bashir Ramzy*	Dominican Republic; Carlos Santa; Arismendy Peguero; Yoel Tapia; Félix Sánchez; Pedro Mejía*

== Results ==
=== Heats ===
Qualification: First 3 teams of each heat (Q) plus the next 2 fastest (q) qualified for the final.

Rank	Heat	Nation	Athletes	Time	Notes
1	1	Bahamas	Andrae Williams, Andretti Bain, Nathaniel McKinney, Avard Moncur	3:02.76	Q
2	2	Jamaica	Allodin Fothergill, Dwight Mullings, Edino Steele, Leford Green	3:04.60	Q
3	1	Dominican Republic	Carlos Santa, Yoel Tapia, Pedro Mejía, Arismendy Peguero	3:04.65	Q
4	2	Trinidad and Tobago	Ato Modibo, Jarrin Solomon, Renny Quow, Zwede Hewitt	3:04.86	Q
5	1	United States	David Neville, Jamaal Torrance, Greg Nixon, Bashir Ramzy	3:05.01	Q
6	2	Brazil	Luis Ambrosio, Sanderlei Parrela, Fernando de Almeida, Anderson Jorge dos Santos	3:05.15	Q
7	1	Puerto Rico	Félix Martínez, Héctor Carrasquillo, Adalberto Amador, Luis Soto	3:11.33	q
8	1	Guatemala	Hans Villagran, Camilo Quevedo, Edwin Baltazar, Allan Ayala	3:16.39	q
9	2	Saint Kitts and Nevis	Kadeem Smith, Jevon Claxton, Adolphus Jones, Melville Rogers	3:21.77	
	1	Cuba	Sergio Hierrezuelo, Omar Cisneros, Yacnier Luis, William Collazo	DQ	
	2	Canada	Keston Nelson, Nathan Vadeboncoeur, Andrew Dargie, Jared MacLeod	DNF	

=== Final ===
Rank	Nation	Athletes	Time	Notes
1st place, gold medalist(s)	Bahamas	Andrae Williams, Avard Moncur, Michael Mathieu, Chris Brown	3:01.94	
2nd place, silver medalist(s)	United States	Greg Nixon, Jamaal Torrance, LaRon Bennett, David Neville	3:02.44	
3rd place, bronze medalist(s)	Dominican Republic	Carlos Santa, Arismendy Peguero, Yoel Tapia, Félix Sánchez	3:02.48	
4	Trinidad and Tobago	Ato Modibo, Renny Quow, Jarrin Solomon, Zwede Hewitt	3:03.60	
5	Jamaica	Allodin Fothergill, Dwight Mullings, Edino Steele, Leford Green	3:04.15	
6	Brazil	Eduardo Vasconcelos, Sanderlei Parrela, Anderson Jorge dos Santos, Fernando de Almeida	3:05.87	
7	Puerto Rico	Héctor Carrasquillo, Félix Martínez, Adalberto Amador, Javier Culson	3:06.22	
8	Guatemala	Jorge Luis Solórzano, Camilo Quevedo, Edwin Baltazar, Allan Ayala	3:17.86	
