= 2009 USA Indoor Track and Field Championships =

- Dates: February 28–March 1
- Host city: Boston, Massachusetts, United States
- Venue: Reggie Lewis Track and Athletic Center
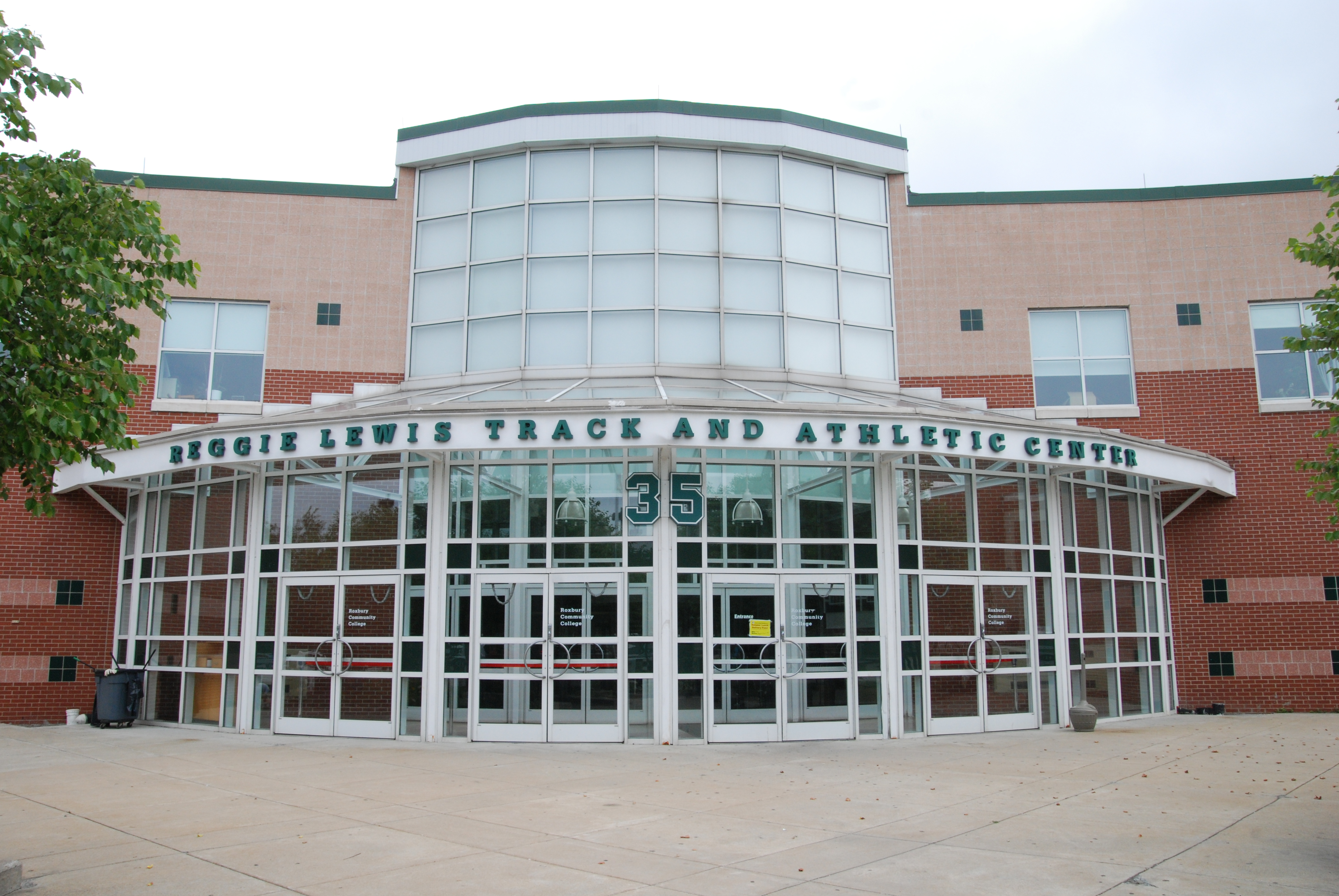
- Level: Senior
- Type: Indoor
- Events: 29 (15 men's + 14 women's)

The 2009 USA Indoor Track and Field Championships were held at the Reggie Lewis Track and Athletic Center in Boston, Massachusetts. Organized by USA Track and Field (USATF), the two-day competition took place February 28-March 1 and served as the national championships in indoor track and field for the United States. The championships in combined track and field events were held at a later date.

At the meeting, Jennifer Stuczynski broke her own American record in the women's pole vault, jumping 4.83 m.

== Medal summary ==
=== Men ===
Event	Gold		Silver		Bronze	
60 m	Mark Jelks	6.51	Dangelo Cherry	6.52	Kendall Stevens	6.56
400 m	Jamaal Torrence	46.37	Kelly Willie	46.59	James Davis	46.80
800 m	Khadevis Robinson	1:48.61	Mark Wieczorek	1:48.94	Matt Scherer	1:49.36
1500 m	Rob Myers	3:45.73	Alan Webb	3:45.82	Steve Sherer	3:46.14
3000 m	David Torrence	7:53.67	Brandon Bethke	7:54.20	Jonathon Riley	7:55.79
60 m hurdles	Terrence Trammell	7.37	Dexter Faulk	7.53	Jerome Miller	7.61
5000 m walk	Tim Seaman	19:59.06	Patrick Stroupe	20:32.26	Michael Tarantino	21:19.78
Distance medley relay	Wisconsin Runner Racing Team; Josh Slamka; Nicholas Ver Duin; Ryan Kleimenhagen; Tommy Schmitz	9:48.06	Syracuse Chargers Track Club; Alex Grout; Jeff Dobson; Justin Wood; Nick Stenuf	10:03.16	Nike Central Park Track Club; Brian Gertzen; Adrian Crichlow; Les Page; Scott Kallgren; Will Seidel	10:10.51
High jump	Andra Manson	2.32 m	Jesse Williams	2.29 m	Dustin Thomas	2.26 m
Pole vault	Jeremy Scott	5.60 m	Brian Mondschein	5.50 m	Darren Niedermeyer	5.40 m
Long jump	Randall Flimmons	7.79 m	Matthew Turner	7.77 m	Dexter Adams	7.73 m
Triple jump	Brandon Roulhac	16.94 m	Muhammad Halim	15.87 m	Alonzo Moore	15.61 m
Shot put	Dan Taylor	20.67 m	Russ Winger	20.44 m	Adam Nelson	20.08 m
Weight throw	Jake Freeman	23.73 m	AG Kruger	23.31 m	Garland Porter	23.24 m
Heptathlon	Jake Arnold	5748 pts	Justin Johnson	5514 pts	Joe Detmer	5505 pts

=== Women ===
Event	Gold		Silver		Bronze	
60 m	Me'Lisa Barber	7.15	Tianna Madison	7.18	Rachelle Boone-Smith	7.19
400 m	Dominique Darden	52.34	Ashlee Kidd	52.44	Shana Cox	53.04
800 m	Katie Waits	2:03.56	Treniere Clement	2:04.32	Jesse Carlin	2:05.98
1500 m	Anna Willard	4:17.37	Shayne Culpepper	4:18.82	Sara Hall	4:19.30
3000 m	Amy Begley	8:53.27	Sara Hall	8:53.72	Julie Culley	8:55.62
60 m hurdles	Lolo Jones	7.84	Hyleas Fountain	7.98	Shantia Moss	8.15
3000 m walk	Joanne Dow	13:04.28	Teresa Vaill	13:14.07	Solomiya Login	13:45.53
High jump	Amy Acuff	1.90 m	Deirdre Mullen	1.85 m	Sharon Day	1.85 m
Pole vault	Jennifer Stuczynski	4.83 m	Stacy Dragila	4.50 m	Melinda Owen	4.00 m
Long jump	Brittney Reese	6.71 m	Hyleas Fountain	6.66 m	Akiba McKinney	6.59 m
Triple jump	Shakeema Welsch	13.77 m	Crystal Manning	13.76 m	Erica McLain	13.68 m
Shot put	Jillian Camarena	18.59 m	Elizabeth Wanless	18.18 m	Karen Shump	17.26 m
Weight throw	Amber Campbell	24.43 m	Erin Gilreath	21.96 m	Kristal Yush	21.63 m
Pentathlon	Diana Pickler	4391 pts	Sharon Day	4320 pts	Julie Pickler	4292 pts
