= Brazil at the World Athletics Indoor Championships =

Brazil at the World Indoor Championships in Athletics
- WA code: BRA
- National federation: Brazilian Athletics Confederation
- Website: www.cbat.org.br
- Medals Ranked 26th: Gold 5 Silver 6 Bronze 6 Total 17

World Indoor Championships in Athletics appearances (overview)
- 1985; 1987; 1989; 1991; 1993; 1995; 1997; 1999; 2001; 2003; 2004; 2006; 2008; 2010; 2012; 2014; 2016; 2018; 2022; 2024

Brazil has participated in all the IAAF World Indoor Championships in Athletics since the beginning in 1985 IAAF World Indoor Games. Brazil won a total of 17 medals (5 gold, 6 silver and 6 bronze). Brazil is 26th on the all time medal table.

== Medalists ==
| Medal | Name | Year | Event |
|---|---|---|---|
| Bronze | João Batista da Silva | 1985 Paris | Men's 200 metres |
| Gold | Zequinha Barbosa | 1987 Indianapolis | Men's 800 metres |
| Bronze | Robson Caetano da Silva | 1987 Indianapolis | Men's 200 metres |
| Silver | Zequinha Barbosa | 1989 Budapest | Men's 800 metres |
| Bronze | Maurren Maggi | 2003 Birmingham | Women's long jump |
| Silver | Jadel Gregório | 2004 Budapest | Men's triple jump |
| Bronze | Osmar dos Santos | 2004 Budapest | Men's 800 metres |
| Silver | Jadel Gregório | 2006 Moscow | Men's triple jump |
| Silver | Maurren Maggi | 2008 Valencia | Women's long jump |
| Bronze | Fabiana Murer | 2008 Valencia | Women's pole vault |
| Gold | Fabiana Murer | 2010 Doha | Women's pole vault |
| Bronze | Keila Costa | 2010 Doha | Women's long jump |
| Gold | Mauro Vinícius da Silva | 2012 Istanbul | Men's long jump |
| Gold | Mauro Vinícius da Silva | 2014 Sopot | Men's long jump |
| Silver | Almir dos Santos | 2018 Birmingham | Men's triple jump |
| Gold | Darlan Romani | 2022 Belgrade | Men's shot put |
| Silver | Thiago Braz | 2022 Belgrade | Men's pole vault |

== Medal tables ==
=== By championships ===
| Year | Gold | Silver | Bronze | Total |
|---|---|---|---|---|
| (Serbia) 2022 Belgrade | 1 | 1 | 0 | 2 |
| (United States) 1987 Indianapolis | 1 | 0 | 1 | 2 |
| (Qatar) 2010 Doha | 1 | 0 | 1 | 2 |
| (Turkey) 2012 Istanbul | 1 | 0 | 0 | 1 |
| (Russia) 2014 Sopot | 1 | 0 | 0 | 1 |
| (Hungary) 2004 Budapest | 0 | 1 | 1 | 2 |
| (Spain) 2008 Valencia | 0 | 1 | 1 | 2 |
| (Hungary) 1989 Budapest | 0 | 1 | 0 | 1 |
| (Russia) 2006 Moscow | 0 | 1 | 0 | 1 |
| (United Kingdom) 2018 Birmingham | 0 | 1 | 0 | 1 |
| (France) 1985 Paris | 0 | 0 | 1 | 1 |
| (United Kingdom) 2003 Birmingham | 0 | 0 | 1 | 1 |
| (Spain) 1991 Seville | 0 | 0 | 0 | 0 |
| (Canada) 1993 Toronto | 0 | 0 | 0 | 0 |
| (Spain) 1995 Barcelona | 0 | 0 | 0 | 0 |
| (France) 1997 Paris | 0 | 0 | 0 | 0 |
| (Japan) 1999 Maebashi | 0 | 0 | 0 | 0 |
| (Portugal) 2001 Lisbon | 0 | 0 | 0 | 0 |
| (United States) 2016 Portland | 0 | 0 | 0 | 0 |
| Totals (19 entries) | 5 | 6 | 6 | 17 |

=== By event ===
| Event | Gold | Silver | Bronze | Total |
|---|---|---|---|---|
| Jumping | 3 | 5 | 3 | 11 |
| Middle-distance | 1 | 1 | 1 | 3 |
| Throwing | 1 | 0 | 0 | 1 |
| Sprinting | 0 | 0 | 2 | 2 |
| Hurdling | 0 | 0 | 0 | 0 |
| Relay | 0 | 0 | 0 | 0 |

=== By gender ===
| Gender | Gold | Silver | Bronze | Total |
|---|---|---|---|---|
| Men | 4 | 5 | 3 | 12 |
| Women | 1 | 1 | 3 | 5 |

== Best Finishes ==
=== Men ===
| Event | Gold | Silver | Bronze | Total | Best finish |
|---|---|---|---|---|---|
| Men's 60 metres | 0 | 0 | 0 | 0 | 5th (2008) |
| Men's 200 metres | 0 | 0 | 1 | 1 | (bronze) (1987) |
| Men's 400 metres | 0 | 0 | 0 | 0 | 7th (1999) |
| Men's 800 metres | 1 | 1 | 1 | 3 | (gold) (1987) |
| Men's 1500 metres | 0 | 0 | 0 | 0 | 9th (1995) |
| Men's 3000 metres | 0 | 0 | 0 | 0 | 17th (1989) |
| Men's 60 m hurdles | 0 | 0 | 0 | 0 | 6th (2018) |
| Men's 4 × 400 metres relay | 0 | 0 | 0 | 0 | 8th (1997) |
| Men's High jump | 0 | 0 | 0 | 0 | 5th (2022) |
| Men's Pole vault | 0 | 1 | 0 | 1 | (silver) (2022) |
| Men's Long jump | 2 | 0 | 0 | 2 | (gold) (2012, 2014) |
| Men's Triple jump | 0 | 3 | 0 | 3 | (silver) (2004, 2006, 2018) |
| Men's Shot put | 1 | 0 | 0 | 1 | (gold) (2022) |
| Men's Heptathlon | 0 | 0 | 0 | 0 | x |

=== Women ===
| Event | Gold | Silver | Bronze | Total | Best finish |
|---|---|---|---|---|---|
| Women's 60 metres | 0 | 0 | 0 | 0 | 8th (2022) |
| Women's 400 metres | 0 | 0 | 0 | 0 | 21st (2003) |
| Women's 800 metres | 0 | 0 | 0 | 0 | 11th (1987) |
| Women's 1500 metres | 0 | 0 | 0 | 0 | x |
| Women's 3000 metres | 0 | 0 | 0 | 0 | x |
| Women's 60 m hurdles | 0 | 0 | 0 | 0 | 14th (2016) |
| Women's 4 × 400 metres relay | 0 | 0 | 0 | 0 | x |
| Women's High jump | 0 | 0 | 0 | 0 | 8th (1991) |
| Women's Pole vault | 1 | 0 | 0 | 1 | (gold) (2010) |
| Women's Long jump | 0 | 1 | 2 | 3 | (silver) (2008) |
| Women's Triple jump | 0 | 0 | 0 | 0 | 9th (2016, 2018) |
| Women's Shot put | 0 | 0 | 0 | 0 | 11th (1997) |
| Women's Pentathlon | 0 | 0 | 0 | 0 | x |

== See also ==
- Brazil at the World Championships in Athletics
- Brazil at the Olympics
- Brazil at the Pan American Games
