= 2010 IAAF World Indoor Championships – Men's 4 × 400 metres relay =

The men's 4 × 400 metres relay competition at the 2010 IAAF World Indoor Championships was held at the ASPIRE Dome on 13 and 14 March 2010.

The winning margin was 3.54 seconds which as of July 2024 remains the only time the men's 4 × 400 metres relay was won by more than 3.5 seconds at these championships.

In the first heat the United States and Jamaica took the top two spots as expected, shortly followed by the Dominican Republic in a national record time of 3:06.30. In the second heat, a clash between Vladimir Antmanis and Marcin Marciniszyn resulted in a baton drop by Russia, which eventually cost them a place in the final. Belgium won heat two but the initial second placers Botswana (which ran an African record of 3:09.60) were later disqualified for a baton exchange outside of the legal zone. The Bahamas benefited from the disqualification and the Dominican Republic and Great Britain entered the final as the fastest losers.

In the final the following day, the United States eased to victory courtesy of strong running from Jamaal Torrance on the first leg and a series of good changeovers – their world leading time of 3:03.40 was three seconds ahead of the rest of the field. Belgium were the next team to finish, scoring a national record 3:06.94 on the way to the country's first ever medal in the event. The other teams suffered a more hectic race: the Bahamas' chances were spoilt when Andretti Bain went down on the track with an injury and Jamaica had a similar fate as Sanjay Ayre pulled up with an injury at the same moment. A poor, late baton exchange between Félix Sánchez and Yoel Tapia on the anchor leg caused them to be disqualified although they finished behind third Great Britain in any case.

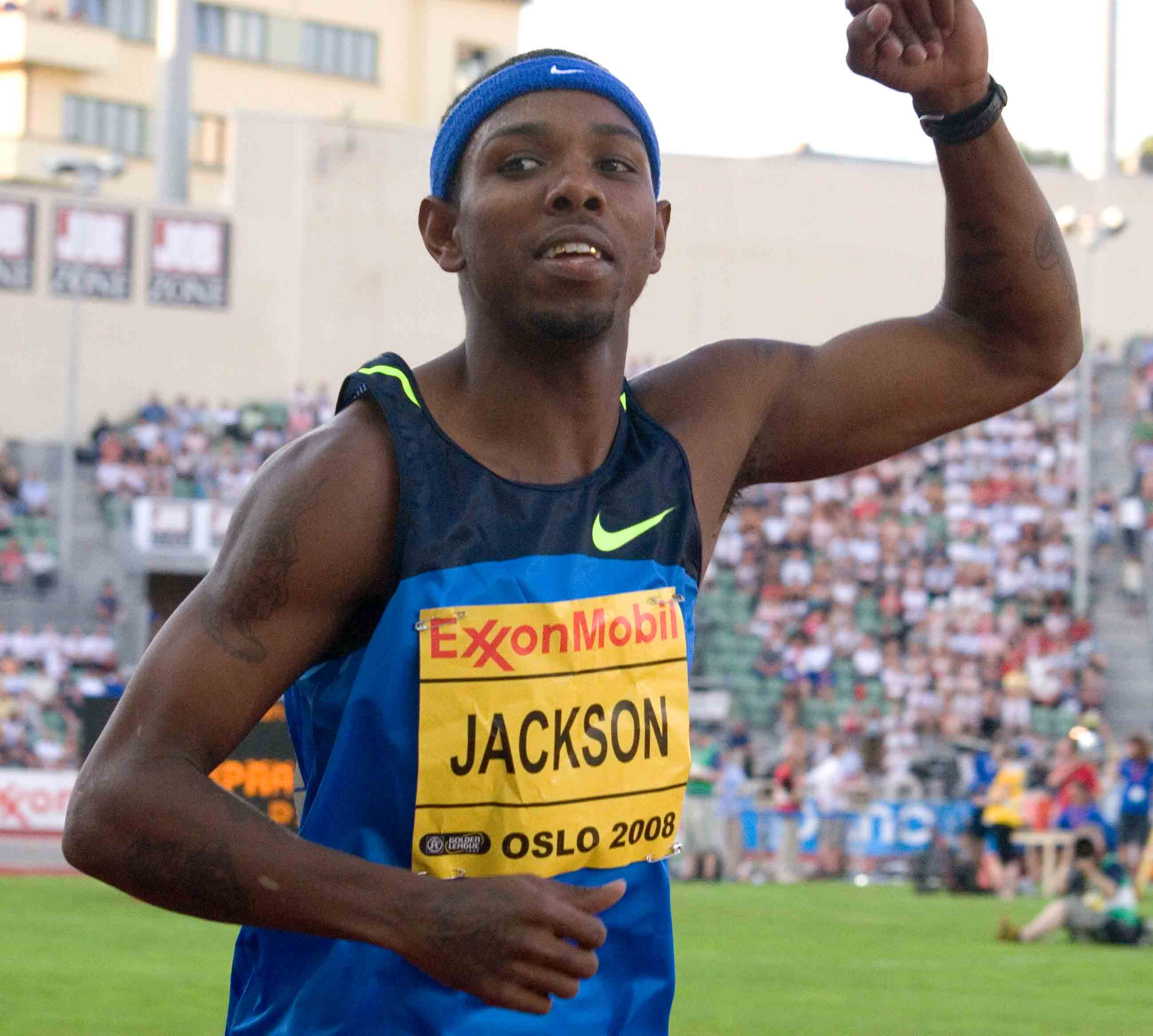
Bershawn Jackson anchored the United States to the gold medal.

== Medalists ==
Gold	Silver	Bronze
United States; Jamaal Torrance; Greg Nixon; Tavaris Tate; Bershawn Jackson	Belgium; Cedric van Branteghem; Kévin Borlée; Antoine Gillet; Jonathan Borlée	Great Britain; Conrad Williams; Nigel Levine; Christopher Clarke; Richard Buck

== Records ==
Standing records prior to the 2010 IAAF World Indoor Championships
World record	United States (USA)	3:02.83	Maebashi, Japan	7 March 1999
Championship record	United States (USA)	3:02.83	Maebashi, Japan	7 March 1999
World Leading	Texas A&M University	3:04.86	College Station, United States	30 January 2010
African record	Nigeria (NGR)	3:09.76	Lisbon, Portugal	10 March 2001
Asian record	Japan (JPN)	3:05.90	Maebashi, Japan	6 March 1999
European record	Poland (POL)	3:03.01	Maebashi, Japan	7 March 1999
North and Central American and Caribbean record	United States (USA)	3:02.83	Maebashi, Japan	7 March 1999
Oceanian Record	Australia (AUS)	3:08.49	Seville, Spain	10 March 1991
South American record	Brazil (BRA)	3:10.50	Paris, France	8 March 1997

== Schedule ==
Date	Time	Round
March 13, 2010	10:00	Heats
March 14, 2010	18:50	Final

== Results ==
=== Heats ===
Qualification: First 2 of each heat (Q) plus the 2 fastest times (q) advance to the final.

Rank	Heat	Nation	Athletes	Time	Notes
1	1	United States	Greg Nixon, LeJerald Betters, Tavaris Tate, Kerron Clement	3:05.78	Q, SB
2	1	Jamaica	Edino Steele, Sanjay Ayre, Lancford Davis, Ricardo Chambers	3:06.03	Q, SB
3	1	Dominican Republic	Arismendy Peguero, Alvin Harrison, Félix Sánchez, Yoel Tapia	3:06.30	q, NR
1	2	Belgium	Jonathan Borlée, Antoine Gillet, Nils Duerinck, Kevin Borlée	3:08.84	Q, PB
5	1	Great Britain	Conrad Williams, Nigel Levine, Luke Lennon-Ford, Christopher Clarke	3:09.59	q, SB
6	2	Bahamas	Michael Mathieu, La'Sean Pickstock, Juan Lewis, Andretti Bain	3:09.68	Q, SB
7	1	Czech Republic	Jiří Vojtík, Josef Prorok, Pavel Jirán, Theodor Jareš	3:09.76	SB
8	2	Russia	Maksim Dyldin, Valentin Kruglyakov, Vladimir Antmanis, Dmitry Buryak	3:09.86	SB
9	2	Poland	Piotr Klimczak, Marcin Sobiech, Marcin Marciniszyn, Kamil Budziejewski	3:09.86	SB
10	2	France	Richard Maunier, Yannick Fonsat, Hugo Grillas, Nicolas Fillon	3:11.40	SB
11	1	Ireland	Nick Hogan, Brian Gregan, Brian Murphy, Billy Ryan	3:13.00	SB
	2	Botswana	Pako Seribe, Isaac Makwala, Thapelo Ketlogetswe, Sakaria Kamberuka	DQ	

=== Final ===
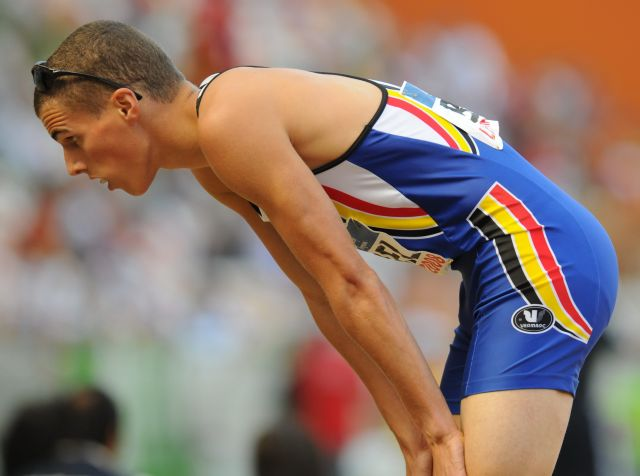
Kévin Borlée helped Belgium to the silver in record time

Rank	Nation	Athletes	Time	Notes
Gold medal	United States	Jamaal Torrance, Greg Nixon, Tavaris Tate, Bershawn Jackson	3:03.40	WL
Silver medal	Belgium	Cedric van Branteghem, Kévin Borlée, Antoine Gillet, Jonathan Borlée	3:06.94	NR
Bronze medal	Great Britain	Conrad Williams, Nigel Levine, Christopher Clarke, Richard Buck	3:07.52	SB
	Dominican Republic	Arismendy Peguero, Alvin Harrison, Félix Sánchez, Yoel Tapia	DQ	
	Bahamas	Michael Mathieu, Andretti Bain, La'Sean Pickstock, Chris Brown	DNF	
	Jamaica	Edino Steele, Sanjay Ayre, Lancford Davis, Ricardo Chambers	DNF	
