= Athletics at the 2008 Summer Olympics – Men's 4 × 400 metres relay =

Men's 4 × 400 metres relay at the Games of the XXIX Olympiad
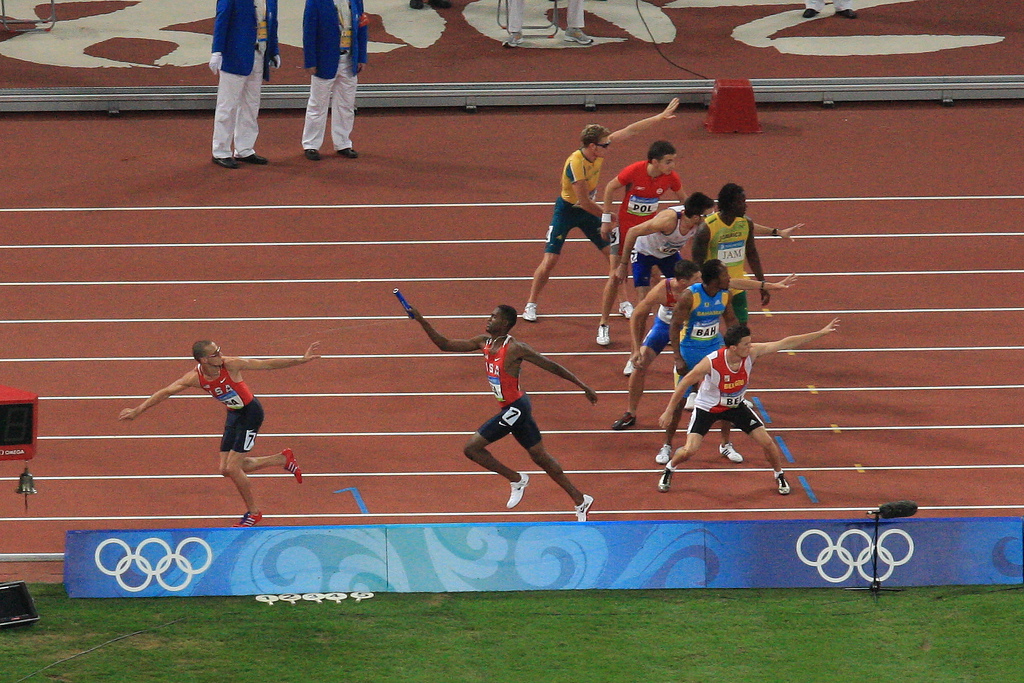
- Athletics at the Olympics 4x400 relay race
- Venue: Beijing National Stadium
- Dates: August 22; August 23 (final)
- Teams: 16
- Winning time: 2:55.39 OR

Medalists
1st place, gold medalist(s)		LaShawn Merritt; Angelo Taylor; David Neville; Jeremy Wariner; Kerron Clement*; Reggie Witherspoon*	United States
2nd place, silver medalist(s)		Andretti Bain; Michael Mathieu; Andrae Williams; Chris Brown; Avard Moncur*; Ramon Miller*	Bahamas
3rd place, bronze medalist(s)		Martyn Rooney; Andrew Steele; Robert Tobin; Michael Bingham	Great Britain

The men's 4 × 400 metres relay event at the 2008 Summer Olympics took place on 22 and 23 August at the Beijing National Stadium.

There were 16 NOCs competing at this event. These 16 NOCs were selected by the average of the two best marks at the qualifying period. The final was won by the United States in the new Olympic record time 2:55.39.

== Summary ==
Having swept the 400 metres and winning the World Championships as part of their qualifying process, defending champion USA came in as an overwhelming favorite.

USA put their Olympic champion LaShawn Merritt on the leadoff leg with the intent to break the race wide open from the start. The strategy worked, Merritt ran 44.01 out of the blocks. 400 hurdles champion Angelo Taylor hit the break line with an 8 metre lead over Belgium, who also front loaded their order with brothers Kévin Borlée and Jonathan Borlée. Jonathan closed down on Taylor down the backstretch, with Bahamas Michael Mathieu working his way through traffic to move into third. Down the home stretch, Taylor re-opened the lead to 8 metres before handing off to bronze medalist David Neville. A 45 second runner, Belgium's Cédric Van Branteghem was no match as Neville pulled away while Bahamas Andrae Williams closed in from behind. USA handed off to their silver medalist Jeremy Wariner, who was also the defending 400 champion coming into these Olympics. Belgium's 47 second anchor Arnaud Ghislain was caught by Bahamas 4th place, 44 second anchor Chris Brown halfway through the turn. Wariner continued to open the gap all the way to a 25 metre victory. Brown was in the sights of Russia's Denis Alekseyev through the final turn until he opened up a clear second place down the home stretch. Taking the baton in 6th place, Great Britain's 400 metre finalist Martyn Rooney worked his way past Jamaica and Belgium, almost catching Alekseyev at the line.

Eight years later, Alekseyev was found guilty of doping. He and the Russian team were disqualified, elevating Great Britain to the bronze medal.

== Records ==
Prior to this competition, the existing world and Olympic records were as follows.

World record	United States; Andrew Valmon; Quincy Watts; Butch Reynolds; Michael Johnson	2:54.29	Stuttgart, Germany	22 August 1993
Olympic record	United States; Andrew Valmon; Quincy Watts; Michael Johnson; Steve Lewis	2:55.74	Barcelona, Spain	8 August 1992

The following Olympic record was set during this competition.

Date	Event	Name	Nationality	Time	OR	WR
23 August	Final	LaShawn Merritt; Angelo Taylor; David Neville; Jeremy Wariner	United States	2:55.39	OR	

== Qualification summary ==
Pos	NOC	2 races		1	2
Pos	NOC	Total	Average	1	2
1	United States	5:54.74	2:57.37	2:55.56	2:59.18
2	Bahamas	5:59.55	2:59.78	2:59.18	3:00.37
3	Jamaica	6:01.20	3:00.60	3:00.44	3:00.76
4	Poland	6:01.75	3:00.87	3:00.05	3:01.70
5	Russia	6:02.69	3:01.34	3:01.07	3:01.62
6	Great Britain	6:03.14	3:01.57	3:01.22	3:01.92
7	Germany	6:03.98	3:01.99	3:01.77	3:02.21
8	Australia	6:04.05	3:02.03	3:01.52	3:02.53
9	Belgium	6:04.64	3:02.32	3:02.13	3:02.51
10	Dominican Republic	6:04.97	3:02.48	3:02.48	3:02.49
11	Japan	6:05.20	3:02.60	3:02.44	3:02.76
12	Cuba	6:05.32	3:02.66	3:02.10	3:03.22
13	France	6:05.98	3:02.99	3:02.33	3:03.65
14	Trinidad and Tobago	6:06.52	3:03.26	3:02.92	3:03.60
15	Greece	6:07.86	3:03.93	3:02.21	3:05.65
16	South Africa	6:08.24	3:04.12	3:03.58	3:04.66
Reserves
17	Italy	6:08.77	3:04.38	3:03.66	3:05.11
18	Botswana	6:09.12	3:04.56	3:03.16	3:05.96
19	Ireland	6:09.14	3:04.57	3:04.43	3:04.71
20	Brazil	6:09.51	3:04.76	3:04.36	3:05.15

== Results ==
All times shown are in seconds.

- Q denotes automatic qualification.
- q denotes fastest losers.
- DNS denotes did not start.
- DNF denotes did not finish.
- DQ denotes disqualified
- AR denotes area record.
- NR denotes national record.
- PB denotes personal best.
- SB denotes season's best.

=== Round 1 ===
First 3 in each heat(Q) and the next 2 fastest(q) advance to the Final.

Rank	Heat	Lane	Nation	Competitors	Time	Notes
1	2	5	Great Britain	Andrew Steele, Robert Tobin, Michael Bingham, Martyn Rooney	2:59.33	Q, SB
2	2	3	Bahamas	Michael Mathieu, Avard Moncur, Ramon Miller, Andrae Williams	2:59.88	Q, SB
3	1	3	United States	David Neville, Kerron Clement, Reggie Witherspoon, Angelo Taylor	2:59.98	Q
4	2	7	Jamaica	Michael Blackwood, Allodin Fothergill, Sanjay Ayre, Ricardo Chambers	3:00.09	Q, SB
5	1	6	Belgium	Cédric Van Branteghem, Jonathan Borlée, Arnaud Ghislain, Kévin Borlée	3:00.67	Q, NR
6	1	8	Australia	Joel Milburn, Mark Ormrod, John Steffensen, Clinton Hill	3:00.68	q, SB
7	1	7	Poland	Marek Plawgo, Piotr Klimczak, Piotr Kędzia, Rafał Wieruszewski	3:00.74	q, SB
8	1	5	South Africa	Pieter Smith, Ofentse Mogawane, Alwyn Myburgh, L.J. van Zyl	3:01.26	SB
9	1	4	Cuba	Yunier Perez, Yunior Díaz, William Collazo, Omar Cisneros	3:02.24	
10	1	2	France	Teddy Venel, Ydrissa Mbarke, Brice Panel, Richard Maunier	3:03.19	
11	2	6	Germany	Simon Kirch, Kamghe Gaba, Ruwen Faller, Bastian Swillims	3:03.49	
12	2	2	Trinidad and Tobago	Ato Modibo, Jovon Toppin, Cowin Mills, Stann Waithe	3:04.12	SB
13	2	4	Japan	Mitsuhiro Abiko, Dai Tamesue, Yoshihiro Horigome, Kenji Narisako	3:04.18	SB
14	2	9	Greece	Stylianos Dimotsios, Dimitrios Gravalos, Pantelis Melachroinoudis, Konstantinos Anastasiou	3:04.30	SB
15	2	8	Dominican Republic	Carlos Yohelin Santa, Arismendy Peguero, Pedro Mejía, Yoel Tapia	3:04.31	SB
DSQ	1	9	Russia	Maksim Dyldin, Vladislav Frolov, Anton Kokorin, Denis Alekseyev		~~Q~~

=== Final ===
Rank	Lane	Nation	Competitors	Time	Notes
1st place, gold medalist(s)	7	United States	LaShawn Merritt, Angelo Taylor, David Neville, Jeremy Wariner	2:55.39	OR
2nd place, silver medalist(s)	5	Bahamas	Andretti Bain, Michael Mathieu, Andrae Williams, Chris Brown	2:58.03	SB
3rd place, bronze medalist(s)	6	Great Britain *	Andrew Steele, Robert Tobin, Michael Bingham, Martyn Rooney	2:58.81	SB
4	8	Belgium	Kévin Borlée, Jonathan Borlée, Cédric Van Branteghem, Arnaud Ghislain	2:59.37	NR
5	2	Australia	Sean Wroe, John Steffensen, Clinton Hill, Joel Milburn	3:00.02	SB
6	3	Poland	Rafał Wieruszewski, Piotr Klimczak, Piotr Kędzia, Marek Plawgo	3:00.32	SB
7	9	Jamaica	Michael Blackwood, Ricardo Chambers, Sanjay Ayre, Lanceford Spence	3:01.45	
DQ	4	Russia	Maksim Dyldin, Vladislav Frolov, Anton Kokorin, Denis Alekseyev	DQ	

* On 14 September 2016, IOC officially stripped Russia of the bronze medal for positive doping test of Denis Alekseyev. Reallocation to Great Britain was confirmed on 21 June 2017.
