= DeWayne Barrett =

Jamaican sprinter (born 1981)

Medal record

Men's athletics

Representing Jamaica

World Indoor Championships
Silver medal – second place	2008 Valencia	4x400 m relay

Universiade
Silver medal – second place	2005 İzmir	400 m

DeWayne Barrett (born December 27, 1981) is a Jamaican sprinter who specializes in the 400 meters. He won a silver medal in the 4 × 400 m relay at the 2008 World Indoor Championships in Valencia, along with Michael Blackwood, Edino Steele, and Adrian Findlay. He also won a silver medal in the 2005 Summer Universiade in the 400 m.

He attended St. John's University in New York City, and graduated in 2005.
