= Adrian Findlay =

Jamaican sprinter (born 1982)

Medal record

Men's athletics

Representing Jamaica

World Indoor Championships
Silver medal – second place	2008 Valencia	4x400 m relay

NACAC U23 Championships
Bronze medal – third place	2004 Sherbrooke	400 m hurdles

Adrian Findlay (born October 1, 1982) is a Jamaican sprinter who specializes in the 400 meters. He won a silver medal in the 4 × 400 m relay at the 2008 World Indoor Championships in Valencia, along with Michael Blackwood, Edino Steele, and DeWayne Barrett. He also won a bronze medal in the 2004 NACAC Under 23 Championships in the 400 m hurdles.

Findlay was an alternate for the 400 m hurdles at the 2008 Olympics. He was investigated for obtaining steroids in violation of Olympic policy. He attended St. Augustine's University in Raleigh, North Carolina. His wife, Peaches Roach-Findlay, is also a sprinter.
