= Reggie Witherspoon =

Reggie Witherspoon may refer to:

- Reggie Witherspoon (basketball) (born 1961), American basketball coach
- Reggie Witherspoon (sprinter) (born 1985), American sprinter
