= Tavaris Tate =

American sprinter (born 1990)

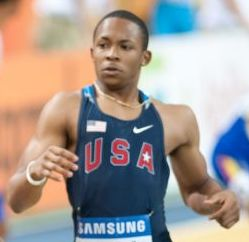
- Tavaris Tate in 2010.

Personal information
- Nationality: American
- Born: December 21, 1990 (age 35) Starkville, Mississippi
- Height: 5 ft 7 in (1.70 m)

Sport
- Sport: Running
- Events: 100 metres, 200 metres, 400 metres
- College team: Mississippi State Bulldogs

Achievements and titles
- Personal bests: 100 m: 10.48 200 m: 20.75 400 m: 44.84
Medal record
Men's athletics
Representing the United States
World Indoor Championships
Gold medal – first place	2010 Doha	4 × 400 m relay
Pan American Junior Championships
Gold medal – first place	2009 Port-of-Spain	4 × 400 m relay
Silver medal – second place	2009 Port-of-Spain	400 m

Tavaris Tate (born December 21, 1990) is an American sprinter.

== Career ==
At the 2009 Pan American Junior Athletics Championships, Tate won a silver medal in the 400 m and a gold medal in the 4 × 400 m relay along with Clayton Parros, Duane Walker, and Joey Hughes.

At the 2010 IAAF World Indoor Championships, Tate won a gold medal in the 4 × 400 m relay along with Jamaal Torrance, Greg Nixon, and Bershawn Jackson.

== Personal bests ==
Event	Time	Venue	Date
100 m	10.48	Pearl	May 9, 2009
200 m	20.75 (-0.8 m/s)	Oxford	April 10, 2010
400 m	44.84	Des Moines	June 26, 2010

Last updated July 11, 2010.
