= Avard Moncur =

Bahamian sprinter

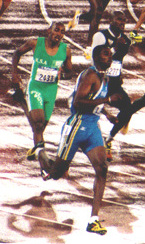
- Moncur (front) in 2000

Personal information
- Born: November 2, 1978 (age 47) Nassau, Bahamas

Sport
- Sport: Track and field
Medal record
Representing Bahamas
Olympic Games
| Silver medal – second place | 2008 Beijing | 4 × 400 m relay |
| Bronze medal – third place | 2000 Sydney | 4 × 400 m relay |
World Championships
| Gold medal – first place | 2001 Edmonton | 400 m |
| Gold medal – first place | 2001 Edmonton | 4 × 400 m relay |
| Silver medal – second place | 2005 Helsinki | 4 × 400 m relay |
| Silver medal – second place | 2007 Osaka | 4 × 400 m relay |
| Bronze medal – third place | 2003 Paris | 4 × 400 m relay |
Commonwealth Games
| Bronze medal – third place | 2002 Manchester | 400 m |
Pan American Games
| Gold medal – first place | 2007 Rio de Janeiro | 4 × 400 m relay |
CAC Championships
| Gold medal – first place | 2003 St George's | 4 × 400 m relay |
| Gold medal – first place | 2011 Mayagüez | 4 × 400 m relay |
| Silver medal – second place | 2008 Cali | 4 × 400 m relay |
CAC Junior Championships (U20)
| Silver medal – second place | 1996 San Salvador | 400 m |
| Bronze medal – third place | 1996 San Salvador | 4 × 100 m relay |
CARIFTA Games Junior (U20)
| Gold medal – first place | 1995 George Town | 400 m |
| Gold medal – first place | 1997 Bridgetown | 400 m |
| Silver medal – second place | 1995 George Town | 4 × 400 m relay |
| Silver medal – second place | 1996 Kingston | 400 m |

Avard Moncur (born November 2, 1978) is a Bahamian track and field athlete competing in the 400 metres. He was born in Nassau.

== Career ==
Under the guidance of coach Henry Rolle, Moncur's most successful year came in 2001 when he won the gold medal in the 400 m and the 4 × 400 m relay at the 2001 World Championships. Moncur has only managed to make one more appearance in the individual final of a major championship, at the 2007 World Championships where he finished 8th.

More success, however, has come has part of the Bahamas relay team. At the 2005 World Championships he (together with Nathaniel McKinney, Andrae Williams and Chris Brown) won a silver medal in 4 × 400 metres relay.

At the 2007 World Championships, Moncur (together with Williams, Brown and Michael Mathieu) won silver in the 4 × 400 m relay for the third time in 2.59.18s.

Moncur's personal best time and national record in the 400 m is 44.45 seconds, achieved in July 2001 in Madrid. However, Chris Brown tied Moncur's national record at the 2007 World Championships.

In addition to currently coaching at the collegiate level, Moncur is coaching one on one lessons to track & field athletes in Atlanta, GA.

== Achievements ==
| Year | Competition | Venue | Position | Event | Notes |
Representing the Bahamas
| 1995 | CARIFTA Games (U-20) | George Town, Cayman Islands | 1st | 400 m | 47.40 |
| 1995 | CARIFTA Games (U-20) | George Town, Cayman Islands | 7th | 400 m hurdles | 56.09 |
| 1995 | CARIFTA Games (U-20) | George Town, Cayman Islands | 2nd | 4 × 400 m relay | 3:15.69 |
| 1996 | CARIFTA Games (U-20) | Kingston, Jamaica | 2nd | 400 m | 47.10 |
| 1996 | CAC Junior Championships (U-20) | San Salvador, El Salvador | 2nd | 400 m | 47.09 |
| 1996 | CAC Junior Championships (U-20) | San Salvador, El Salvador | 3rd | 4 × 100 m relay | 41.51 |
| 1996 | World Junior Championships | Sydney, Australia | 17th (sf) | 400 m | 47.90 |
| 1997 | CARIFTA Games (U-20) | Bridgetown, Barbados | 1st | 400 m | 46.90 |
| 1997 | CAC Championships | San Juan, Puerto Rico | 3rd | 4 × 400 m relay | 3:09.15 |
| 1998 | Central American and Caribbean Games | Maracaibo, Venezuela | 3rd | 4 × 400 m relay | 3:04.16 |
| 1999 | Pan American Games | Winnipeg, Manitoba, Canada | 8th | 400 m | 45.60 |
| 1999 | Pan American Games | Winnipeg, Manitoba, Canada | 1st (h) | 4 × 400 m relay | 3:00.73 |
| 2000 | Olympic Games | Sydney, Australia | 5th (sf) | 400 m | 45.18 |
| 2000 | Olympic Games | Sydney, Australia | 4th | 4 × 400 m relay | 2:59.23 |
| 2001 | World Championships | Edmonton, Canada | 1st | 400 m | 44.64 |
| 2001 | World Championships | Edmonton, Canada | 1st | 4 × 400 m relay | 2:58.19 |
| 2001 | Goodwill Games | Brisbane, Australia | 2nd | 400 m | 45.31 |
| 2001 | Goodwill Games | Brisbane, Australia | 2nd | 4 × 400 m relay | 3:01.67 |
| 2002 | Commonwealth Games | Manchester, England | 3rd | 400 m | 45.12 |
| 2002 | IAAF Grand Prix Final | Paris, France | 4th | 400 m | 44.97 |
| 2003 | CAC Championships | St. George's, Grenada | 1st | 4 × 400 m relay | 3:02.56 |
| 2003 | World Championships | Paris, France | 18th (sf) | 400 m | 45.65 |
| 2003 | World Championships | Paris, France | 3rd | 4 × 400 m relay | 3:00.53 |
| 2005 | World Championships | Helsinki, Finland | 2nd | 4 × 400 m relay | 2:57.32 NR |
| 2006 | Commonwealth Games | Melbourne, Australia | 10th (sf) | 400 m | 45.72 |
| 2006 | Commonwealth Games | Melbourne, Australia | — | 4 × 400 m relay | DNF |
| 2007 | Pan American Games | Rio de Janeiro, Brazil | 1st | 400 m | 44.85 SB |
| 2007 | Pan American Games | Rio de Janeiro, Brazil | 1st | 4 × 400 m relay | 3:01.94 |
| 2007 | World Championships | Osaka, Japan | 8th | 400 m | 45.40 |
| 2007 | World Championships | Osaka, Japan | 2nd | 4 × 400 m relay | 2:59.18 SB |
| 2008 | CAC Championships | Cali, Colombia | 2nd | 4 × 400 m relay | 3:02.48 |
| 2008 | Olympic Games | Beijing, China | 2nd | 4 × 400 m relay | 2:59.88 (h) SB |
| 2009 | World Championships | Berlin, Germany | — | 4 × 400 m relay | DQ |
| 2011 | CAC Championships | Mayagüez, Puerto Rico | 1st | 4 × 400 m relay | 3:01.33 |
| 2011 | World Championships | Daegu, South Korea | 9th (h) | 4 × 400 m relay | 3:01.54 |

As of 7 September 2024, Moncur holds the track record for 400 metres for Thessaloníki where he ran 44.70 seconds on 22/08/2001.
