= Joel Stallworth =

American sprinter (born 1984)

Personal information
- Born: 22 May 1984 (age 42)
- Education: Samuel Hancock Christian School; San Joaquin Delta College; California State University, Stanislaus
- Height: 6 ft 3 in (191 cm)
- Weight: 190 lb (86 kg)

Sport
- Country: United States
- Sport: Sport of athletics
- Event: 400 metres
- College team: San Joaquin Delta Mustangs; Stanislaus State Warriors

Achievements and titles
- National finals: 2008 USA Indoors; • 400m, 4th
- Personal bests: 400m: 45.40 (2007); 200m: 20.80 sh (2007)
Medal record
Men's athletics
Representing the United States
World Indoor Championships
Gold medal – first place	2008 Valencia	4 × 400 m relay
- Updated on November 2024

Joel Stallworth (born 18 January 1983) is an American former sprinter specializing in the 400 metres and the 2008 World Athletics Indoor Championships gold medalist in the 4 × 400 m relay by virtue of running in the heats. Originally recruited for basketball to California State University, Stanislaus, Stallworth picked up sprinting and finished runner-up at the 2007 NCAA Division II men's outdoor track and field championships. In 2020, he sued his former sponsor Nike, Inc. and a manager for racial discrimination at a Nike store.

== Career ==
Stallworth did not compete in high school track and field, and he was recruited to Stanislaus State Warriors from San Joaquin Delta College not for track but for basketball. While at Stanislaus State, Stallworth joined the track team and was a three-time NCAA Division II All American.

Stallworth's highest national finish came in 2007, when he finished runner-up at the NCAA Division II Men's Outdoor Track and Field Championships, running personal best 45.40 seconds just 0.03 behind Hakeem Mohamed.

Stallworth qualified for the 2007 and 2009 USA Outdoor Track and Field Championships, but he did not advance past the first round at either event.

Stallworth achieved his highest international success in 2008, when he finished 4th in the two-heat timed final 400 m at the 2008 USA Indoor Track and Field Championships. This qualified him to represent the United States at the World Indoor Championships 4 × 400 m heats, where he ran the 3rd leg to help the U.S. team advance to the finals with the fastest qualifying time. In the finals, he was replaced by Greg Nixon and the United States won the gold medal ahead of Jamaica and the Dominican Republic.

At the 2008 United States Olympic trials, Stallworth finished 5th in his heat and did not qualify to represent the United States at the 2008 Summer Olympics.

== Personal life ==
Stallworth was born on 22 May 1984 and grew up in East Stockton, California, which he described as "one of the roughest neighborhoods in California". In 2001, he graduated from Samuel Hancock Christian School, a small school in Stockton, California that did not have a track and field team and closed in 2006. He first attended San Joaquin Delta College, where he walked on to the basketball team. He was recruited to California State University, Stanislaus not for his sprinting but for his basketball skills, and he graduated in 2007. After graduation, he signed a professional track and field contract with Stellar Athletics. In 2008, Stallworth served as an assistant coach for the Cal Poly Pomona Broncos track and field team.

In July 2019, Stallworth, his wife, and his son were accused by store management of stealing a basketball from a Nike, Inc. store at the Third Street Promenade in Santa Monica, California. Nike had sponsored Stallworth when he was a professional athlete in 2008. Stallworth described the incident as "embarrassing" and "disrespecting" because he had paid for the ball and had to present his receipt to the Santa Monica Police Department. In July 2020, they filed a civil rights lawsuit against Nike and the store manager for claims of racial profiling. In December 2020, the racial bias claim was dismissed by a judge who said Stallworth had failed to state claims against the other parties. The following week, Stallworth revived the claims on the basis that there was an agreement between the store and local police. In June 2021, Nike lost its motion to dismiss the suit and the case moved to the discovery phase.

As of 2016, Stallworth lived in the Los Angeles area. After his retirement from sprinting, Stallworth founded a streetwear brand.

== Statistics ==
=== Personal best progression ===
400m progression
#	Mark	Pl.	Competition	Venue	Date	Ref.
1	47.83	4th (Round 1)	Woody Wilson Classic	Davis, CA	21 Apr 2006	
2	46.99	1st place, gold medalist(s)	Sac Inv	Sacramento, CA	28 Apr 2006	
3	46.29	1st place, gold medalist(s)		Turlock, CA	2 Mar 2007	
4	46.09	(gold) (Heat 2)	CCAA	San Francisco, CA	4 May 2007	
5	45.40	2nd place, silver medalist(s)	NCAA-II	Charlotte, NC	25 May 2007	
