= Pedro Mejía (athlete) =

Dominican Republic sprinter

Personal information
- Full name: Pedro Juan Mejía Eusebio
- Nationality: Dominican Republic
- Born: 29 June 1978 (age 48)
- Height: 1.80 m (5 ft 11 in)
- Weight: 73 kg (161 lb)

Sport
- Sport: Athletics
- Event: 4 × 400 metres relay
Medal record
Men's athletics
Representing Dominican Republic
Pan American Games
Bronze medal – third place	2007 Rio de Janeiro	4×400 m
World Indoor Championships
Bronze medal – third place	2008 Valencia	4×400 m

Pedro Juan Mejía Eusebio (born June 29, 1978) is a Dominican sprinter, who specialized in the 400 metres. He won two bronze medals, as a member of the Dominican Republic national team, in the men's 4 × 400 m relay at the 2007 Pan American Games in Rio de Janeiro, Brazil, and at the 2008 IAAF World Indoor Championships in Valencia, Spain.

Mejia competed for the men's 4 × 400 m relay at the 2008 Summer Olympics in Beijing, along with his teammates Yoel Tapia, Carlos Yohelin Santa, and Arismendy Peguero. He ran on the third leg of the second heat, with an individual-split time of 46.31 seconds. Mejia and his team finished the relay in last place for a seasonal best time of 3:04.31, failing to advance into the final.
