= Reggie Witherspoon (sprinter) =

American sprinter

Personal information
- Born: Reginald Edwin Witherspoon; May 31, 1985 (age 41)
Medal record
Men's athletics
Representing the United States
Olympic Games
Gold medal – first place	2008 Beijing	4 × 400 m relay

Reginald Edwin "Reggie" Witherspoon (born May 31, 1985, in Pasadena, California) is an American sprinter. He competed for University of Florida and later Baylor University. He was part of the USA's gold medal-winning team in the men's 4 × 400 m relay at the 2008 Beijing Olympics, after running in the heats. Witherspoon also held the Indoor National High School Record at 400 m, which was held by William Reed, with his time of 46.11 seconds at the 2003 National Scholastic Indoor Championships in New York.
