= Nathaniel McKinney =

Bahamian sprinter

Personal information
- Born: 19 January 1982 (age 44)

Sport
- Sport: Track and field
- Club: St. Augustine's Falcons
Medal record
Representing Bahamas
World Championships
Silver medal – second place	2005 Helsinki	4x400 m relay
Bronze medal – third place	2003 Paris	4x400 m relay
Pan American Games
Gold medal – first place	2007 Rio de Janeiro	4x400m relay

Nathaniel Benjamin McKinney (born January 19, 1982) is a Bahamian athlete competing mainly in the 4 × 400 m relay.

At the 2004 Olympic Games McKinney's relay team finished sixth. At the 2005 World Championships, McKinney together with Avard Moncur, Andrae Williams and Chris Brown won the silver medal.

McKinney attended Saint Augustine's College in Raleigh, North Carolina and is a member of Phi Beta Sigma fraternity.

McKinney also played 7-a-side rugby for The Bahamas' National 7s Team.
