= Grzegorz Zajączkowski =

Polish sprinter (born 1980)

Medal record

Men's athletics

Representing Poland

World Indoor Championships
Bronze medal – third place	2003 Birmingham	4×400m relay

Grzegorz Zajączkowski (born 25 June 1980) is a Polish sprinter who specializes in the 400 metres.

Zajączkowski was part of Poland's 4 × 400 metres relay at the 2003 World Indoor Championships, together with teammates Rafał Wieruszewski, Marcin Marciniszyn and Marek Plawgo. The team originally finished in 4th place, but received bronze medals after the 1st place USA team was later disqualified.

== Personal bests ==
- 100 metres – 10.58 s (2004)
- 200 metres – 20.95 s (2004)
- 400 metres – 45.93 s (2004)
