= Kelly Willie =

American former track and field athlete (born 1982)

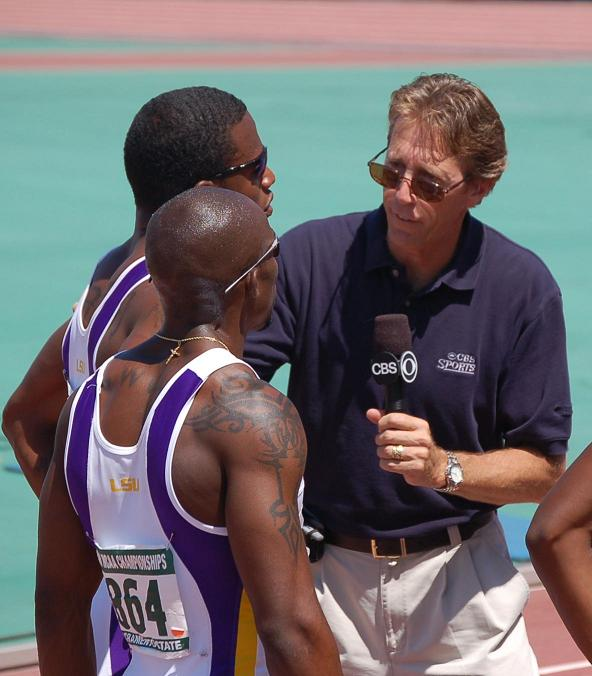
- Willie (foreground) being interviewed by Dwight Stones in 2006

Personal information
- Full name: Kelly Jeromy Willie
- Born: September 7, 1982 (age 43) Houston, Texas, U.S.
- Height: 5 ft 10 in (1.78 m)
- Weight: 158 lb (72 kg)

Achievements and titles
- Personal bests: 400 m: 44.63 (Sacramento, California 2004); 200 m: 20.24/20.20w (Rethymo, Greece 2006); 100 m: 10.14/10.04w (Knoxville, Tennessee 2006)
Medal record
Men's athletics
Representing the United States
Olympic Games
Gold medal – first place	2004 Athens	4 × 400 m relay
World Indoor Championships
Gold medal – first place	2008 Valencia	4 × 400 m relay

Kelly Jeromy Willie (born September 7, 1982) is an American former track and field athlete who specialized in the 400-meter dash.

Born and raised in Houston, Texas, he attended Sterling High School and competed in track while there. Willie attended Louisiana State University and ran for their LSU Tigers team, being a three-time NCAA champion in the relay and the 400 m runner-up in 2004. He ran for the American 4 × 400-meter relay team at the 2004 Olympics,

With strong American 400 metre runners like Andrew Rock, Derrick Brew, Darold Williamson and Wariner (who constituted the gold-winning relay team at the 2005 World Championships), and even LaShawn Merritt, Jamel Ashley and Terry Gatson, Willie had faced extremely tough competition in terms of qualifying for major international events, where only three participants from each state are allowed.
