= Allodin Fothergill =

Jamaican sprinter (born 1987)

Personal information
- Born: 7 February 1987 (age 39) Saint Catherine Parish, Jamaica

Sport
- Country: Jamaica
- Sport: Athletics
- Event: Sprinting
Medal record
Men's athletics
Representing Jamaica
World Championships
Bronze medal – third place	2011 Daegu	4×400 m relay
World Indoor Championships
Bronze medal – third place	2014 Sopot	4×400 m relay
Central American and Caribbean Games
Gold medal – first place	2010 Mayagüez	4x400 m relay
Bronze medal – third place	2010 Mayagüez	400 m
CAC Junior Championships (U20)
Gold medal – first place	2006 Port of Spain	4x400 m relay
Silver medal – second place	2006 Port of Spain	400 m
CARIFTA Games Junior (U20)
Gold medal – first place	2006 Les Abymes	4x400 m relay
Silver medal – second place	2006 Les Abymes	400 m
- Updated on 22 January 2015

Allodin Fothergill (born 7 February 1987) is a Jamaican athlete who specializes in the 400m.

Fothergill competed for the Maryland Eastern Shore Hawks track and field team in the NCAA.

== Personal bests ==
Event	Result	Venue	Date
Outdoor
200 m	20.91 s (wind: +0.8 m/s)	Spanish Town, Jamaica	4 June 2006
400 m	45.24 s	Mayagüez, Puerto Rico	26 July 2010
Indoor
60 m	6.83 s	Princess Anne, United States	26 February 2012
400 m	46.45 s	Boston, United States	7 March 2010

== Achievements ==
Year	Competition	Venue	Position	Event	Notes
Representing Jamaica
2006	CARIFTA Games (U-20)	Les Abymes, Guadeloupe	2nd	400 m	47.04
2006	CARIFTA Games (U-20)	Les Abymes, Guadeloupe	1st	4x400 m relay	3:07.75 CR
2006	Central American and Caribbean Junior Championships (U-20)	Port of Spain, Trinidad and Tobago	2nd	400 m	46.17
2006	Central American and Caribbean Junior Championships (U-20)	Port of Spain, Trinidad and Tobago	1st	4 × 400 m relay	3:06.99
2006	World Junior Championships	Beijing, China	6th	400m	46.68
2006	World Junior Championships	Beijing, China	6th	4 × 400 m relay	3:08.28
2007	Pan American Games	Rio de Janeiro, Brazil	5th	4 × 400 m relay	3:04.15
2008	Olympic Games	Beijing, China	4th (h)^{1}	4 × 400 m relay	3:00.09
2010	Central American and Caribbean Games	Mayagüez, Puerto Rico	3rd	400m	45.24
2010	Central American and Caribbean Games	Mayagüez, Puerto Rico	1st	4 × 400 m relay	3:01.68
2011	World Championships	Daegu, South Korea	3rd	4 × 400 m relay	3:00.10
2013	Central American and Caribbean Championships	Morelia, Mexico	5th	4 × 400 m relay	3:03.69 A
2014	World Indoor Championships	Sopot, Poland	3rd	4 × 400 m relay	3:03.69
2014	Pan American Sports Festival	Mexico City, Mexico	2nd	400m	45.47 A

^{1}: Did not compete in the final (Jamaica finished 8th).
