= Yoel Tapia =

Dominican sprinter (born 1984)

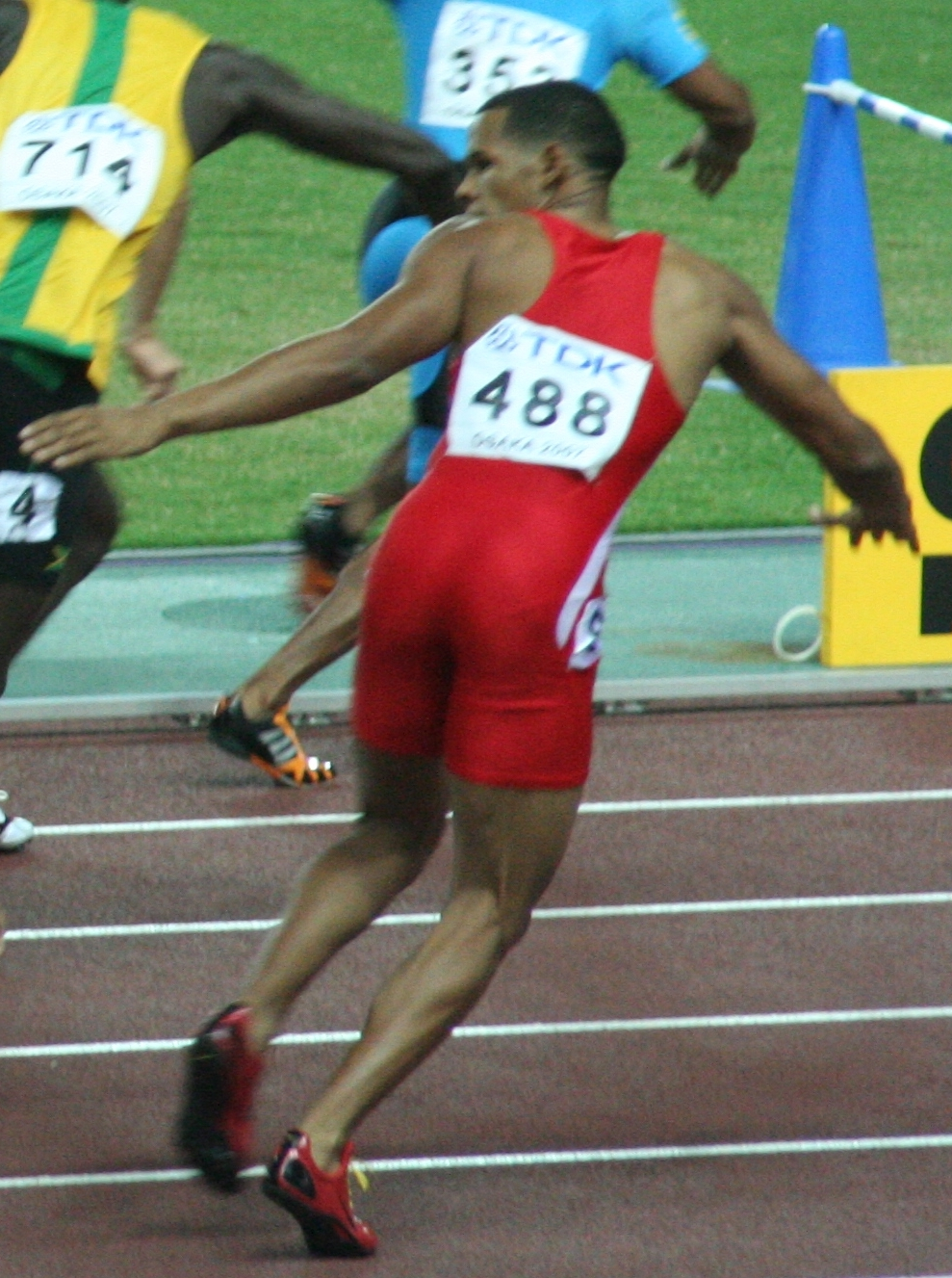
- Yoel Tapia in 2007

Personal information
- Full name: Yoel Armando Tapia Gómez
- Nationality: Dominican Republic
- Born: 11 September 1984 (age 41) Monte Cristi, Dominican Republic
- Height: 1.85 m (6 ft 1 in)
- Weight: 73 kg (161 lb)

Sport
- Sport: Athletics
- Event: 4 × 400 metres relay

Achievements and titles
- Personal best: 400 m: 45.76 s (2010)
Medal record
Men's athletics
Representing Dominican Republic
World Indoor Championships
Bronze medal – third place	2008 Valencia	4×400 m
Pan American Games
Silver medal – second place	2011 Guadalajara	4×400 m
Bronze medal – third place	2007 Rio de Janeiro	4×400 m
Ibero-American Championships
Gold medal – first place	2006 Ponce	4×400 m

Yoel Armando Tapia Gómez (born September 11, 1984, in Monte Cristi) is a Dominican sprinter, who specialized in the 400 metres. He won two medals for the national relay team at the 2007 Pan American Games in Rio de Janeiro, Brazil, and also, at the 2011 Pan American Games in Guadalajara, Mexico.

Tapia competed for the men's 4 × 400 m relay at the 2008 Summer Olympics in Beijing, along with his teammates Pedro Mejía, Arismendy Peguero, and Carlos Yohelin Santa. He ran on the anchor leg of the second heat, with an individual-split time of 45.79 seconds. Tapia and his team finished the relay in last place for a seasonal best time of 3:04.31, failing to advance into the final.
