= 2008 IAAF World Indoor Championships =

12th IAAF World Indoor Championships
- Dates: 7 March–9 March
- Host city: Valencia, Spain
- Venue: Luis Puig Palace
- Events: 26
- Participation: 574 athletes from 147 nations

The 2008 IAAF World Indoor Championships in Athletics were held at the Luis Puig Palace in Valencia, Spain, March 7–9, 2008.

== Bid ==
Valencia was announced the winning bidder by the IAAF on November 13, 2005, at an IAAF Council meeting in Moscow, Russia.

== Results ==
=== Men ===
2004 | 2006 | 2008 | 2010 | 2012

Event	Gold		Silver		Bronze	
60 m	Olusoji A. Fasuba; Nigeria	6.51 (WL)	Dwain Chambers; Great Britain	6.54 (PB)	Not awarded	
60 m	Olusoji A. Fasuba; Nigeria	6.51 (WL)	Kim Collins; Saint Kitts and Nevis	6.54 (SB)	Not awarded	
60 m	Fasuba's win became the first indoor short dash World Championship title for Africa					
400 m	Tyler Christopher; Canada	45.67 (WL)	Johan Wissman; Sweden	46.04 (PB)	Chris Brown; Bahamas	46.26 (SB)
400 m	Tyler Christopher stayed behind Wissman and Brown until the final homestraight, when he sped to victory off the last bend.					
800 m	Abubaker Kaki Khamis; Sudan	1:44.81 (WL)	Mbulaeni Mulaudzi; South Africa	1:44.91 (NR)	Yusuf Saad Kamel; Bahrain	1:45.26 (AR)
800 m	Abubaker Kaki Khamis led from the start in attempt to win and held off the fast approaching Mbulaeni Mulaudzi by a tenth of a second to win his first major international title at just 18!					
1500 m	Deresse Mekonnen; Ethiopia	3:38.23	Daniel Kipchirchir Komen; Kenya	3:38.54	Juan Carlos Higuero; Spain	3:38.82
1500 m	Mekonnen was initially disqualified for stepping on the inside of the track, and Spaniard Arturo Casado was named as the bronze medallist, but the Ethiopian was reinstated. Higuero's was the first medal of the championships for the host country.					
3000 m	Tariku Bekele; Ethiopia	7:48.23	Paul Kipsiele Koech; Kenya	7:49.05	Abreham Cherkos; Ethiopia	7:49.96
3000 m	Tariku Bekele won his first World title, succeeding his brother as 3000 m champion, who had won the title at the previous championships.					
60 m hurdles	Liu Xiang; China	7.46 (SB)	Allen Johnson; United States	7.55	Evgeniy Borisov; Russia	7.60
60 m hurdles	Liu Xiang; China	7.46 (SB)	Allen Johnson; United States	7.55	Staņislavs Olijars; Latvia	7.60 (SB)
60 m hurdles	Liu Xiang and Dayron Robles, the favorites for this event, were expected to battle for the gold, but Robles was eliminated in the heats after mistakenly believing there was a false start.					
4 × 400 m relay	United States (USA); James Davis; Jamaal Torrance; Greg Nixon; Kelly Willie; Joel Stallworth*	3:06.79 (WL)	Jamaica (JAM); Michael Blackwood; Edino Steele; Adrian Findlay; DeWayne Barrett; Aldwyn Sappleton*	3:07.69 (SB)	Dominican Republic (DOM); Arismendy Peguero; Carlos Santa; Pedro Mejía; Yoel Tapia	3:07.77 (NR)
High jump	Stefan Holm; Sweden	2.36	Yaroslav Rybakov; Russia	2.34	Andra Manson; United States	2.30 (SB)
High jump	Stefan Holm; Sweden	2.36	Yaroslav Rybakov; Russia	2.34	Kyriakos Ioannou; Cyprus	2.30
High jump	Stefan Holm regained his title from Rybakov who won in 2006 to become 4-time world indoor champion. Ioannou earned Cyprus its first ever medal at an Indoor World Championship.					
Pole vault	Yevgeniy Lukyanenko; Russia	5.90 (WL)	Brad Walker; United States	5.85 (PB)	Steven Hooker; Australia	5.80 (SB)
Pole vault	insert write up:					
Long jump	Godfrey Khotso Mokoena; South Africa	8.08 (SB)	Chris Tomlinson; Great Britain	8.06	Mohamed Salman Al-Khuwalidi; Saudi Arabia	8.01
Long jump	Tomlinson's 8.06 held the lead from the first round, until the fifth when Mokoena reached 8.08, which Tomlinson was then unable to match. Mokoena's result was the shortest winning jump in the history of the World Indoor Championships.					
Triple jump	Phillips Idowu; Great Britain	17.75 (NR)(WL)	Arnie David Giralt; Cuba	17.47 (PB)	Nelson Évora; Portugal	17.27
Triple jump	Idowu's winning jump came in the second round, and set a new British and Commonwealth record.					
Shot put	Christian Cantwell; United States	21.77	Reese Hoffa; United States	21.20	Tomasz Majewski; Poland	20.93 (NR)
Shot put	Hoffa set a 21.49m best at the qualification. Cantwell's victory put was the 4th best in the history of Indoor World Championships.					
Heptathlon (60 m, LJ, SP, HJ, 60 m H, PV, 1000 m)	Bryan Clay; United States	6371 (WL)	Andrei Krauchanka; Belarus	6234 (NR)	Dmitriy Karpov; Kazakhstan	6131
Heptathlon (60 m, LJ, SP, HJ, 60 m H, PV, 1000 m)	(6.71 - 7.75 - 16.21 - 2.09 - 7.86 - 5.00 - 2:55.64)		(7.19 - 7.63 - 14.29 - 2.15 - 8.11 - 5.30 - 2:46.49)		(7.20 - 7.31 - 16.19 - 2.06 - 8.15 - 5.20 - 2:47.45)	
Heptathlon (60 m, LJ, SP, HJ, 60 m H, PV, 1000 m)	Clay dominated from early on, leading by 170 points after the first two events. Clay was on world record pace as the first day came to a close. Clay fell short of the world record but held on for a comfortable win, taking first in four of seven events.					
WR world record | AR area record | CR championship record | GR games record | NR national record | OR Olympic record | PB personal best | SB season best | WL world leading (in a given season)

=== Women ===
2004 | 2006 | 2008 | 2010 | 2012

Event	Gold		Silver		Bronze	
60 m	Angela Williams; United States	7.06 (WL)	Jeanette Kwakye; Great Britain	7.08 (NR)	Tahesia Harrigan; British Virgin Islands	7.09 (NR)
60 m	After several seasons of injury, Angela Williams finally wins her first world title in personal best time. Ene Franca Idoko of Nigeria was a favorite, but she stumbled out of the blocks, finishing 7th.					
400 m	Olesya Zykina; Russia	51.09 (WL)	Natalya Nazarova; Russia	51.10 (SB)	Shareese Woods; United States	51.41 (PB)
400 m	Olesya Zykina won the event, which was the closest women's World Indoor 400 m final in history, with Nazarova second for a 1–2 win for Russia.					
800 m	Tamsyn Lewis; Australia	2:02.57	Tetiana Petlyuk; Ukraine	2:02.66	Maria de Lurdes Mutola; Mozambique	2:02.97
800 m	Tamsyn Lewis surprised by winning her first World title, breaking Mutola's hopes of winning her eighth title on her last competitive year. Home hopeful, Mayte Martínez was a disappointing fourth.					
1500 m	Gelete Burka; Ethiopia	3:59.75 (AR)	Maryam Yusuf Jamal; Bahrain	3:59.79 (AR)	Daniela Yordanova; Bulgaria	4:04.19 (NR)
1500 m	Yelena Soboleva led for most of the fast race to win in a new world record time, breaking her own one-month-old world record by 0.34 s. Soboleva was later disqualified for doping along with second placed Yuliya Fomenko, and her world record was rescinded.					
3000 m	Meseret Defar; Ethiopia	8:38.79	Meselech Melkamu; Ethiopia	8:41.50	Mariem Alaoui Selsouli; Morocco	8:41.66
3000 m	Meseret Defar completed a hat-trick of World Indoor 3000 m titles in her kick-finish, which her countrywoman Meselech Melkamu was unable to respond to.					
60 m hurdles	LoLo Jones; United States	7.80	Candice Davis; United States	7.93	Anay Tejeda; Cuba	7.98
60 m hurdles	After new World record holder Swede Susanna Kallur injured a hamstring during her warm-up for the semi-final and pulled out of the competition, Lolo Jones became the favorite, and did indeed win by a fairly large margin. Spanish Josephine Onyia, the home crowd's hope, tripped over the fifth hurdle to finish last.					
4 × 400 m relay	Russia (RUS); Yuliya Gushchina; Tatyana Levina; Natalya Nazarova; Olesya Zykina	3:28.17 (WL)	Belarus (BLR); Anna Kozak; Iryna Khliustava; Sviatlana Usovich; Ilona Usovich	3:28.90 (SB)	United States (USA); Angel Perkins; Miriam Barnes; Shareese Woods; Moushaumi Robinson	3:29.30 (SB)
4 × 400 m relay	insert write up:					
High jump	Blanka Vlašić; Croatia	2.03	Yelena Slesarenko; Russia	2.01	Vita Palamar; Ukraine	2.01 (NR)
High jump	Blanka Vlasic was the clear favourite for the win after taking the world outdoor title the previous year.					
Pole vault	Yelena Isinbayeva; Russia	4.75	Jennifer Stuczynski; United States	4.75 (PB)	Fabiana Murer; Brazil	4.70 (AR)
Pole vault	Yelena Isinbayeva; Russia	4.75	Jennifer Stuczynski; United States	4.75 (PB)	Monika Pyrek; Poland	4.70 (SB)
Pole vault	Yelena Isinbayeva won her third consecutive Indoor World title.					
Long jump	Naide Gomes; Portugal	7.00 (WL)	Maurren Maggi; Brazil	6.89 (AR)	Irina Simagina; Russia	6.88
Long jump	Naide Gomes set a National Record to win her first world title.					
Triple jump	Yargelis Savigne; Cuba	15.05 (AR)	Marija Šestak; Slovenia	14.68	Olga Rypakova; Kazakhstan	14.58 (AR)
Triple jump	Hrysopiyi Devetzi led until the last round, when Yargelis Savigne leaped a new Area Record into victory. Devetzi was retrospectively disqualified in 2016 after failing a doping test.					
Shot put	Valerie Vili; New Zealand	20.19 (AR)	Li Meiju; China	19.09 (PB)	Misleydis González; Cuba	18.75 (PB)
Shot put	Vili set two area records in her first indoor contest for four years--					
Pentathlon (60 mH, HJ, SP, LJ, 800 m)	Tia Hellebaut; Belgium	4867 (WL)	Kelly Sotherton; Great Britain	4852 (SB)	Anna Bogdanova; Russia	4753
Pentathlon (60 mH, HJ, SP, LJ, 800 m)	(8.54 - 1.99 - 13.85 - 6.41 - 2:16.42)		(8.25 - 1.81 - 14.57 - 6.45 - 2:09.95)		(8.39 - 1.84 - 14.56 - 6.38 - 2:15.67)	
Pentathlon (60 mH, HJ, SP, LJ, 800 m)	Tia Hellebaut's 1.99 clearance in the High jump moved her into the lead which she was able to keep until the end. In the last event, 800 m, Kelly Sotherton would have needed a 7.7 s lead over Hellebaut to win gold, but finished only 6.47 s ahead.					
WR world record | AR area record | CR championship record | GR games record | NR national record | OR Olympic record | PB personal best | SB season best | WL world leading (in a given season)

== Medal table ==
Rank	Nation	Gold	Silver	Bronze	Total
1	United States (USA)	5	5	3	13
2	Russia (RUS)	4	3	3	10
3	Ethiopia (ETH)	4	1	1	6
4	Great Britain (GBR)	1	4	0	5
5	Cuba (CUB)	1	1	2	4
6	China (CHN)	1	1	0	2
6	South Africa (RSA)	1	1	0	2
6	Sweden (SWE)	1	1	0	2
9	Australia (AUS)	1	0	1	2
9	Portugal (POR)	1	0	1	2
11	Belgium (BEL)	1	0	0	1
11	Canada (CAN)	1	0	0	1
11	Croatia (CRO)	1	0	0	1
11	New Zealand (NZL)	1	0	0	1
11	Nigeria (NGR)	1	0	0	1
11	Sudan (SUD)	1	0	0	1
17	Belarus (BLR)	0	2	0	2
17	Kenya (KEN)	0	2	0	2
19	Bahrain (BHR)	0	1	1	2
19	Brazil (BRA)	0	1	1	2
19	Ukraine (UKR)	0	1	1	2
22	Jamaica (JAM)	0	1	0	1
22	Saint Kitts and Nevis (SKN)	0	1	0	1
22	Slovenia (SLO)	0	1	0	1
25	Kazakhstan (KAZ)	0	0	2	2
25	Poland (POL)	0	0	2	2
27	Bahamas (BAH)	0	0	1	1
27	British Virgin Islands (IVB)	0	0	1	1
27	Bulgaria (BUL)	0	0	1	1
27	Cyprus (CYP)	0	0	1	1
27	Dominican Republic (DOM)	0	0	1	1
27	Latvia (LAT)	0	0	1	1
27	Morocco (MAR)	0	0	1	1
27	Mozambique (MOZ)	0	0	1	1
27	Saudi Arabia (KSA)	0	0	1	1
27	Spain (ESP)	0	0	1	1
Totals (36 entries)		26	27	28	81

== Participating nations ==
- Algeria (2)
- Andorra (1)
- Antigua and Barbuda (2)
- Argentina (1)
- Armenia (1)
- Australia (9)
- Austria (2)
- Azerbaijan (1)
- Bahamas (7)
- Bahrain (4)
- Belarus (9)
- Belgium (4)
- Bermuda (1)
- Bolivia (1)
- Bosnia and Herzegovina (1)
- Botswana (3)
- Brazil (13)
- British Virgin Islands (1)
- Brunei (1)
- Bulgaria (6)
- Burkina Faso (1)
- Burundi (1)
- Cameroon (1)
- Canada (8)
- Cape Verde (1)
- Chile (1)
- China (11)
- Chinese Taipei (2)
- Cook Islands (1)
- Colombia (1)
- Comoros (2)
- Costa Rica (1)
- Ivory Coast (1)
- Croatia (1)
- Cuba (11)
- Cyprus (1)
- Czech Republic (13)
- Denmark (2)
- Dominica (1)
- Dominican Republic (4)
- Egypt (1)
- Equatorial Guinea (1)
- Estonia (3)
- Ethiopia (6)
- Federated States of Micronesia (1)
- Fiji (1)
- Finland (2)
- France (12)
- French Polynesia (1)
- Gabon (1)
- Germany (16)
- Ghana (2)
- Great Britain (28)
- Greece (5)
- Grenada (2)
- Guam (1)
- Guinea (1)
- Guyana (2)
- Haiti (1)
- Honduras (1)
- Hong Kong (1)
- Hungary (1)
- Indonesia (1)
- Iran (1)
- Ireland (2)
- Israel (1)
- Italy (13)
- Jamaica (13)
- Japan (5)
- Jordan (1)
- Kazakhstan (5)
- Kenya (7)
- Kiribati (1)
- Kyrgyzstan (2)
- Kuwait (1)
- Laos (1)
- Latvia (3)
- Lebanon (1)
- Liberia (5)
- Liechtenstein (1)
- Lithuania (3)
- Macau (1)
- Macedonia (1)
- Madagascar (1)
- Maldives (1)
- Malaysia (1)
- Mali (1)
- Malta (2)
- Mauritius (1)
- Mexico (5)
- Moldova (1)
- Monaco (1)
- Morocco (8)
- Mozambique (1)
- Myanmar (1)
- Namibia (1)
- Nauru (1)
- Netherlands (3)
- New Zealand (3)
- Nigeria (6)
- Norfolk Island (1)
- Norway (1)
- Palau (1)
- Paraguay (1)
- Poland (15)
- Portugal (7)
- Puerto Rico (2)
- Qatar (4)
- Romania (13)
- Russia (47)
- Rwanda (1)
- Saint Kitts and Nevis (1)
- Saint Vincent and the Grenadines (1)
- El Salvador (1)
- Samoa (1)
- San Marino (2)
- Saudi Arabia (2)
- Senegal (1)
- Serbia (2)
- Seychelles (1)
- Sierra Leone (1)
- Singapore (2)
- Slovakia (4)
- Slovenia (5)
- Solomon Islands (1)
- South Africa (3)
- Spain (23)
- Sudan (2)
- Sweden (10)
- Switzerland (1)
- Syria (1)
- Tajikistan (1)
- Togo (1)
- Tonga (1)
- Trinidad and Tobago (1)
- Turkey (4)
- Turkmenistan (1)
- Uganda (1)
- Ukraine (16)
- United Arab Emirates (1)
- United States (49)
- United States Virgin Islands (2)
- Uruguay (1)
- Uzbekistan (2)
- Vanuatu (1)
- Venezuela (1)
- Zambia (1)
