= James Davis (sprinter) =

American sprinter

Personal information
- Born: March 19, 1976 (age 50) Boulder, Colorado, United States

Sport
- Sport: Track and field
Medal record
Representing United States
World Indoor Championships
Gold medal – first place	2008 Valencia	4x400 m relay
Pan American Games
Silver medal – second place	2003 Santo Domingo	4x400 m relay

James Davis (born March 19, 1976) is an American former sprinter who specialized in 400 m and 200 m. He has won the gold medal in the 4 × 400 metres relay race on 2008 IAAF World Indoor Championships in Valencia, Spain.

Davis was an All-American sprinter for the Colorado Buffaloes track and field team, anchoring their 7th-place 4 × 400 meter relay team at the 1999 NCAA Division I Indoor Track and Field Championships.
