= Edino Steele =

Jamaican sprinter

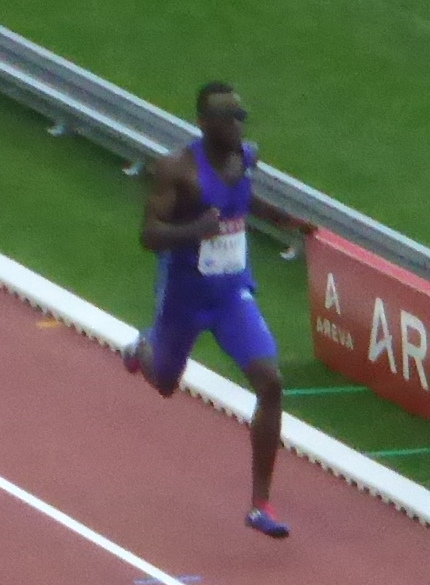
- Edino Steele in 2015

Personal information
- Born: 6 January 1987 (age 39) Kingston, Jamaica
- Height: 1.8 m (5 ft 11 in)

Sport
- Sport: Track and field
- Event: 400 m
Medal record
Men's athletics
Representing Jamaica
World Championships
Silver medal – second place	2013 Moscow	4 × 400 m relay
World Indoor Championships
Silver medal – second place	2008 Valencia	4 × 400 m relay
Bronze medal – third place	2014 Sopot	4 × 400 m relay
CAC Junior Championships
Gold medal – first place	2006 Port of Spain	4 × 400 m relay
Bronze medal – third place	2006 Port of Spain	400 m

Edino Steele (born 6 January 1987) is a Jamaican sprinter. He is known for winning a silver medal in the 4 × 400 metre at the 2008 IAAF World Indoor Championships; and for his controversial failed appearance on the 2012 Jamaican Olympics 4 × 400 team at the 2012 Summer Olympics. He competed in the 4 × 400 metres relay event at the 2013 World Championships in Athletics, winning a silver medal.

== World junior circuit ==
He represented Jamaica at the 2006 World Junior Championships in Athletics and placed 5th after coming a close 3rd in his Semi-Final, but left with a certainty that this was the career he wanted for the rest of his life. That same year he went back to the drawing board for the 2006 Central American and Caribbean Junior Championships and clocked 46.29 to take the bronze behind Allodin Fothergill (46.17) and the winner Renny Quow (46.14). And also claiming gold for Jamaica in the 4 × 400 relay over Trinidad & Barbados.

== Professional athletic career ==
After his success with the Jamaican team and his mentor, Coach Glen Mills, Steele decided in June 2007 to become a Professional Track Athlete for Jamaica. He quickly relocated to the island and joined the revered Racers Track Club under the guidance of Mills & Bertland Cameron. The following year he made Jamaica's National Team for the 2008 IAAF World Indoor Championships. Representing in the 4 × 400 metres relay he and teammates Michael Blackwood, Adrian Findlay and DeWayne Barrett took home the silver medal with a time of 3:07.69.

=== 400 metre success ===
Steele came back to Jamaica ready to broaden his race. Opting in to also do the 200 meter where his Personal Best is 20.56. After dabbling in both races in 2011 he broke out as a local sensation in the 400 m when he got the better of his training partner Yohan Blake. "Racers Track Club's Edino Steele stole the spotlight yesterday in the men's 400 metres at the Camperdown Classics as he clocked 46.16 seconds to get the better of teammate Yohan Blake who was second in 47.03 at the UWI/Usain Bolt Track in Mona."

== 2012 London Olympics ==
After a positive year local & overseas Steele entered into the Jamaican Olympic Trials for the 400 m. He was fated to be the next Jamaican sensation. However due to hiccups he placed 5th in the final to his dismay, but it landed him a spot on the 4 × 400 metres relay team. At the Olympics he had to watch from the sidelines as the coach preferred to use Riker Hylton (6th place at the trials) and an apparently injured Jermaine Gonzales in the heats. Gonzales pulling up on his second leg resulted in the elimination of the Jamaicans, who were expected to challenge for a medal.

== 2013 road to Moscow ==
Steele entered into the 2013 World Championships in Athletics in the 400 m with high hopes. He placed second in his heat with a time of 45.75 to continue to the semi-finals. Steele placed 2nd again in the semi-finals with a time of 45.91 to qualify for the finals with the 6th best time, giving him lane 8. In the finals he would end up repeating his 5th place of last year with a time of 45.53 . Making the 4 × 400 metres relay team once more in which Steele claimed the silver medal with his team mates Rusheen McDonald, Javere Bell and Javon Francis.

== Personal bests ==
Event	Result	Wind	Venue	Date
60 metres	6.80		Princess Anne (USA)	6 January 2007
100 metres	10.39	-0.3	Tabor (CZE)	21 August 2012
200 metres	20.43	+1.7	Ljubljana (SLO)	13 July 2013
300 metres	32.32		Lahti (FIN)	17 July 2013
400 metres	45.38		Kingston (JAM)	1 July 2012
4 × 400 metres	3:03.74		Kingston (JAM)	23 February 2013
