= Andrae Williams =

Bahamian sprinter

Personal information
- Born: 12 July 1983 (age 43) Freeport, Bahamas

Sport
- Sport: Track and field
- Club: Texas Tech Red Raiders
Medal record
Men's athletics
Representing Bahamas
Olympic Games
Silver medal – second place	2008 Beijing	4x400 m relay
World Championships
Silver medal – second place	2005 Helsinki	4x400 m relay
Silver medal – second place	2007 Osaka	4x400 m relay
Pan American Games
Gold medal – first place	2007 Rio de Janeiro	4x400 m relay
CAC Junior Championships (U20)
Silver medal – second place	2002 Bridgetown	4×400 m relay

Andrae Williams (born 12 July 1983) is a Bahamian sprint athlete mainly competing in the 400m.

== University ==
Williams competed in collegiate track at Texas Tech University.

== 2004 ==
In the 2004 Olympic Games, Williams was a member of the Bahamian 4 x 400 metres relay team that finished 6th.

== 2005 ==
In June 2005, Williams set a new personal best of 44.90 in the 400 metres.

At the 2005 World Championships, Williams and the Bahamas won silver in 4 X 400 m relay behind the United States.

== 2007 ==
At the 2007 World Championships, Williams (together with Avard Moncur, Chris Brown and Michael Mathieu) won silver in the 4 × 400 m relay in 2.59.18s.
