= Greg Nixon =

American sprinter (born 1981)

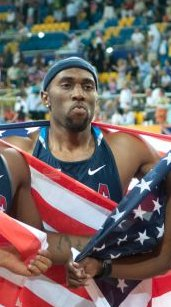
- Nixon in 2010

Personal information
- Born: September 12, 1981 (age 45) New Orleans, Louisiana, U.S.
- Education: Howard Payne University
- Height: 6 ft 0 in (183 cm)
- Weight: 165 lb (75 kg)

Sport
- Country: United States
- Sport: Athletics
- University team: HPU Yellow Jackets
- Coached by: Quincy Watts
Medal record
Men's athletics
Representing the United States
World Championships
Gold medal – first place	2011 Daegu	4 × 400 m relay
World Indoor Championships
Gold medal – first place	2008 Valencia	4 × 400 m relay
Gold medal – first place	2010 Doha	4 × 400 m relay
Pan American Games
Silver medal – second place	2007 Rio de Janeiro	4 × 400 m relay

Greg Nixon (born September 12, 1981) is an American sprinter who specialises in the 400 meters. His success has come mostly in the 400 m and 4 × 400-meter relay, he is a three-time World Champion and a two-time USA Champion.

Nixon attended and competed for Howard Payne University in both sprinting and football.

His first major medal came at the Athletics at the 2007 Pan American Games, where he led off the American relay team to win a silver medal. At the 2008 IAAF World Indoor Championships, Nixon finished third in his 400 m heat with a time of 47.64. He also won a gold medal in the 4 × 400 m relay.

At the 2010 IAAF World Indoor Championships, Nixon won a second gold medal in the 4 × 400 m relay. He ran a 400 m personal best of 44.61 seconds winning his second USA 400 m title at the 2010 USA Championships, out of lane 8.

At the 2011 USA Championships, Nixon reached the podium again to make the 2011 World Champion team. He went on to win another gold medal for team USA.

Now an athlete-turned-entrepreneur, Greg is married to Nicole Nixon, and together they have two sons, Gregory Nixon III (G3) and Amari Nixon.
