= Jamaal Torrance =

American sprinter (born 1983)

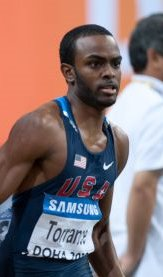
- Torrance at the 2010 World Indoors

Personal information
- Born: July 20, 1983 (age 42) Orlando, Florida, U.S.
- Height: 5 ft 8 in (173 cm)
- Weight: 130 lb (59 kg)

Sport
- Sport: Running
- Event: 400 metres

Achievements and titles
- Personal best: 400 m: 44.80
Medal record
Men's athletics
Representing the United States
World Championships
Gold medal – first place	2011 Daegu	4 × 400 m relay
World Indoor Championships
Gold medal – first place	2008 Valencia	4x400 m relay
Gold medal – first place	2010 Doha	4x400 m relay
Gold medal – first place	2012 Istanbul	4 × 400 m relay
Bronze medal – third place	2010 Doha	400 m

Jamaal Torrance (born July 20, 1983) is an American sprinter, who specializes in the 400 meters.

== Career ==
In 2005, Torrance Anchored an NCAA Division II Outdoors 4 × 400 m runner up team (3:07.79) and placed seventh at the NCAA Division II Outdoors (47.41).

In 2006, Torrance came in fourth at the NCAA Division II Outdoors (47.19), became the NCAA Division II Indoor champion (46.89), and anchored for the winning team at the NCAA Division II 4 × 400 m (3:08.78)

At the 2007 Pan American Games, Torrance won a silver medal being part of the 4 × 400 m relay. Torrence finished seventh in the 400 meters with a time of 46.06.

At the 2008 IAAF World Indoor Championships, Torrance won a gold medal being part of the 4 × 400 m relay.

At the 2010 IAAF World Indoor Championships, Torrance won a bronze medal in the 400 meters with a time of 46.43 and a gold medal in the 4 × 400 m relay.
