= Michael Blackwood (sprinter) =

Jamaican sprinter (born 1976)

Medal record

Men's athletics

Representing Jamaica

Olympic Games
Silver medal – second place	2000 Sydney	4x400 m relay

World Championships
Silver medal – second place	2001 Edmonton	4x400 m relay
Silver medal – second place	2003 Paris	4x400 m relay
Bronze medal – third place	2003 Paris	400 m
Bronze medal – third place	2005 Helsinki	4x400 m relay

World Indoor Championships
Bronze medal – third place	2001 Lisbon	4x400 m relay
Gold medal – first place	2003 Birmingham	4x400 m relay
Silver medal – second place	2008 Valencia	4x400 m relay

Commonwealth Games
Gold medal – first place	2002 Manchester	400 m

Michael Blackwood (born 29 August 1976 in Clarendon) is a Jamaican male track and field athlete, who specialized in the 400 meters, his personal best being 44.60 set during his win at the 2002 IAAF World Cup. He was chosen as the Jamaica Sportsman of the Year in 2002, in that same year he was the world number one rank by IAAF in the 400 meters. He is the brother of Catherine Scott who earned a silver medal in the 2000 Sydney Olympic Games. Blackwood won the NAIA national 400 meters title in 1997. He is the winner of Jamaica 400 meters national championships three times. Blackwood holds the Big 12 conference record in the 400 meters since 2000 in the time of 44.69. He is an alumnus of The University of Oklahoma.

Blackwood was the 400 meters gold medallist at the 2002 Commonwealth Games, the bronze medallist at the 2003 World Championships, the winner at the 2002, 2003 and 2004 IAAF World Athletics Final, eighth in the Athletics at the 2004 Summer Olympics – Men's 400 meters at the 2004 Olympic Games, and a semi-finalist at the 2005 World Championships.

He had much success with the Jamaican 4×400 metres relay team: he won a silver at the 2000 Sydney Olympics, silver at the 2001 and 2003 World Championships, a bronze at the 2005 World Championships, a gold at the 2003 IAAF World Indoor Championships and a final silver at the 2008 IAAF World Indoor Championships.

At the 2009 Jamaica National Championships, Blackwood tried for a spot at the 2009 World Championships in Athletics, but was disqualified running outside his lane in the semi-finals of the 400 m. In August, he announced his retirement from the sport.

== Medal upgrades ==
In 2009 American sprinter Jerome Young admitted to doping during the period of 1999 through 2003. The IAAF gave Young a life ban as a result and annulled his performances. This had a significant effect on Blackwoods career: Jamaica were elevated to World Indoor 4 × 400 m Relay gold medal, where Blackwood ran the third leg. He was given the 400 m bronze medal at the 2003 World Championships, as well as being moved up to the top spot at the 2003 World Athletics Final.

== International competition record ==
Year	Competition	Venue	Position	Notes
2002	Commonwealth Games	Manchester, England	1st	
2002	IAAF Grand Prix Final	Paris, France	1st	
2002	IAAF World Cup	Madrid, Spain	1st	44.60, current PB
2003	IAAF World Indoor Championships	Birmingham	1st	4 × 400 m relay
2003	IAAF World Championships	Paris	3rd	
2003	World Athletics Final	Monaco	1st	
2004	World Athletics Final	Monaco	1st	
