= 1995 IAAF World Indoor Championships – Men's 4 × 400 metres relay =

The men's 4 × 400 metres relay event at the 1995 IAAF World Indoor Championships was held on 12 March.

== Results ==
Rank	Nation	Athletes	Time	Notes
1st place, gold medalist(s)	United States	Rod Tolbert, Calvin Davis, Tod Long, Frankie Atwater	3:07.37	
2nd place, silver medalist(s)	Italy	Fabio Grossi, Andrea Nuti, Roberto Mazzoleni, Ashraf Saber	3:09.12	
3rd place, bronze medalist(s)	Japan	Masayoshi Kan, Seiji Inagaki, Tomonari Ono, Hiroyuki Hayashi	3:09.73	
4	Great Britain	Guy Bullock, Paul Slythe, Mark Hylton, Allyn Condon	3:10.89	
