= 4 × 400 metres relay =

Track and field relay event covering 1600 metres

Athletics 4 × 400 metres relay
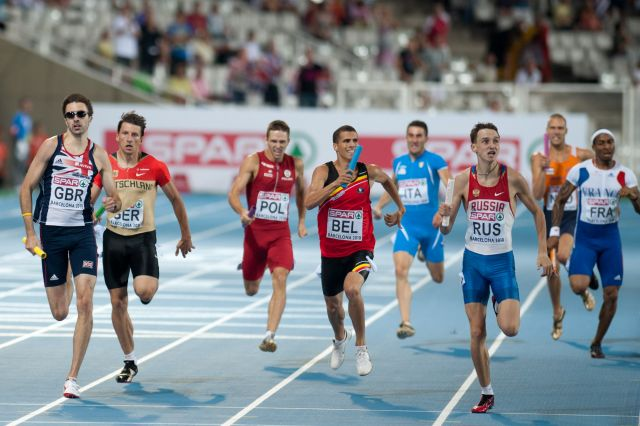
- 4 × 400 m men relay at the 2010 European Championships (Martyn Rooney (GBR), Thomas Schneider (GER), Kacper Kozłowski (sprinter) (POL), Jonathan Borlée (BEL), Vladimir Krasnov (RUS), Teddy Venel (FRA))

World records
- Men: United States (Andrew Valmon, Quincy Watts, Butch Reynolds, Michael Johnson) 2:54.29 (1993)
- Women: Soviet Union (Tatyana Ledovskaya, Olga Nazarova, Mariya Pinigina, Olga Bryzgina) 3:15.17 (1988)

Olympic records
- Men: United States (Christopher Bailey, Vernon Norwood, Bryce Deadmon, Rai Benjamin) 2:54.43 (2024)
- Women: Soviet Union (Tatyana Ledovskaya, Olga Nazarova, Mariya Pinigina, Olga Bryzgina) 3:15.17 (1988)

World Championship records
- Men: United States (Andrew Valmon, Quincy Watts, Butch Reynolds, Michael Johnson) 2:54.29 (1993)
- Women: United States (Isabella Whittaker, Lynna Irby, Aaliyah Butler, Sydney McLaughlin-Levrone) 3:16.61 (2025)

The 4 × 400 metres relay or long relay is an athletics track event in which teams consist of four runners who each complete 400 metres or one lap, totaling 1600 meters. It is traditionally the final event of a track meet. The first leg and the first bend of the second leg are run in lanes. Start lines are thus staggered over a greater distance than in an individual 400 metres race; the runners then typically move to the inside of the track. The slightly longer 4 × 440 yards relay, on an Imperial distance, was a formerly run British Commonwealth and American event, until metrication was completed in the 1970s.

== Format ==
Relay race runners typically carry a relay baton which they must transfer between teammates. Runners have a 20 m box (usually marked with blue lines) in which to transfer the baton. The first transfer is made within the staggered lane lines; for the second and third transfers, runners typically line up across the track despite the fact that runners are usually running in line on the inside of the track. This prevents confusion and collisions during transfer. Unlike the 4 × 100 m relay, runners in the 4 × 400 typically look back and grasp the baton from the incoming runner, due to the fatigue of the incoming runner, and the wider margins allowed by the longer distance of the race. Consequently, disqualification is rare.

As runners have a running start, split times cannot be compared to individual 400 m performances. Internationally, the U.S. men's team has dominated the event, but have been challenged by Jamaica in the 1950s and Britain in the 1990s. The current men's Olympic champions are from the United States.

According to the IAAF rules, world records in relays can only be set if all team members have the same nationality.

=== Mixed ===
Mixed-sex 4 × 400 metres relays were introduced at the 2017 IAAF World Relays, with the IAAF first recognizing a world record in that event at the 2019 World Athletics Championships. In March 2022 World Athletics Council decided a set order – man, woman, man, woman – at future championships. Eventually, the format was added to the Olympics, starting with the Tokyo Olympics in 2021.

== Records ==
=== World records ===
Men's Outdoor World Record
Country	Members	Place	Date	Time
United States	Andrew Valmon, Quincy Watts, Butch Reynolds, Michael Johnson	Stuttgart, Germany	22 August 1993	2:54.29

Note: The IAAF rescinded a time of 2:54.20 set at Uniondale on 22 July 1998 by the United States (Jerome Young, Antonio Pettigrew, Tyree Washington, Michael Johnson) on 12 August 2008 after Pettigrew admitted to using human growth hormone and EPO between 1997 and 2003.

Men's Indoor World Record
Country	Members	Place	Date	Time
United States	Amere Lattin, Obi Igbokwe, Jermaine Holt, Kahmari Montgomery	Clemson, United States	9 February 2019	3:01.51

Note: The above world record was bettered by three teams at the 2018 NCAA Division I Championship on 10 March 2018 at the Gilliam Indoor Track Stadium in College Station, United States:

- 3:00.77 by the USC team of Zach Shinnick, Rai Benjamin, Ricky Morgan Jr., Michael Norman). This time was not record-eligible because Benjamin was a citizen of Antigua & Barbuda, and the others are United States citizens. Benjamin has since switched to represent the United States.
- 3:01.39 by the Texas A&M team of Ilolo Izu, Robert Grant, Devin Dixon and Mylik Kerley. All four runners represent the United States, and World Athletics currently lists this as the NACAC area record, but it has not been ratified as the world record.
- 3:01.43 by the Florida team of Kunle Fasasi, Grant Holloway, Chantz Sawyers, and Benjamin Lobo Vedel. This time was not record-eligible because Fasasi represents Nigeria, Holloway represents the United States, Sawyers represents Jamaica, and Vedel represents Denmark.

Women's Outdoor World Record
Country	Members	Place	Date	Time
USSR	Tatyana Ledovskaya (BLR), Olga Nazarova (RUS), Mariya Pinigina (UKR), Olga Bryzgina (UKR)	Seoul, South Korea	1 October 1988	3:15.17

Women's Indoor World Record
Country	Members	Place	Date	Time
Russia	Yuliya Gushchina, Olga Kotlyarova, Olga Zaytseva, Olesya Krasnomovets	Glasgow, Scotland	27 January 2006	3:23.37

Note: The above world record was bettered in a time of 3:21.75 by the University of Arkansas team of Amber Anning, Joanne Reid, Rosey Effiong, and Britton Wilson at the 2023 NCAA Division I Indoor Championship on 11 March 2023 in Albuquerque, New Mexico, United States. This time was not record-eligible because Anning was a citizen of Great Britain, Reid was a citizen of Jamaica, and Effiong and Wilson were United States citizens.

=== Olympic records ===
Men's Olympic Record
Country	Members	Place	Date	Time
United States	Christopher Bailey, Vernon Norwood, Bryce Deadmon, Rai Benjamin	Saint-Denis, France	10 August 2024	2:54.43

Women's Olympic Record
Country	Members	Place	Date	Time
Soviet Union	Tatyana Ledovskaya, Olga Nazarova, Mariya Pinigina, Olga Bryzgina	Seoul, South Korea	1 October 1988	3:15.17

=== Area records ===
- Updated 22 May 2026.

Area	Men				Women			
Area	Time	Season	Athletes	Team	Time	Season	Athletes	Team
Africa (records)	2:54.47	2026	Lee Eppie, Letsile Tebogo, Bayapo Ndori, Collen Kebinatshipi	Botswana	3:21.04	1996	Olabisi Afolabi, Fatima Yusuf, Charity Opara, Falilat Ogunkoya	Nigeria
Asia (records)	2:58.33	2024	Yuki Joseph Nakajima, Kaito Kawabata, Fuga Sato, Kentaro Sato	Japan	3:24.28	1993	An Xiaohong, Bai Xiaoyun, Cao Chunying, Ma Yuqin	China
Europe (records)	2:55.83	2024	Alex Haydock-Wilson, Matthew Hudson-Smith, Lewis Davey, Charlie Dobson	Great Britain	3:15.17 WR	1988	Tatyana Ledovskaya, Olga Nazarova, Mariya Pinigina, Olha Bryzghina	Soviet Union
North, Central America and Caribbean (records)	2:54.29 WR	1993	Andrew Valmon, Quincy Watts, Butch Reynolds, Michael Johnson	United States	3:15.27	2024	Shamier Little, Sydney McLaughlin-Levrone, Gabrielle Thomas, Alexis Holmes	United States
Oceania (records)	2:55.20	2026	Luke van Ratingen, Reece Holder, Tom Reynolds, Aidan Murphy	Australia	3:23.81	2000	Nova Peris, Tamsyn Manou, Melinda Gainsford-Taylor, Cathy Freeman	Australia
South America (records)	2:58.56	1999	Eronilde de Araújo, Anderson Jorge dos Santos, Claudinei da Silva, Sanderlei Parrela	Brazil	3:26.68	2011	Geisa Coutinho, Bárbara de Oliveira, Joelma Sousa, Jailma de Lima	Brazil

== All-time top 10 by country (outdoor) ==
=== Men ===
- Correct as of May 2026.

Rank	Time	Team	Nation	Date	Place	Ref.
1	2:54.29	Andrew Valmon, Quincy Watts, Butch Reynolds, Michael Johnson	United States	22 August 1993	Stuttgart	
2	2:54.47	Lee Eppie, Letsile Tebogo, Bayapo Ndori, Collen Kebinatshipi	Botswana	3 May 2026	Gaborone	
3	2:55.07	Mthi Mthimkulu, Lythe Pillay, Leendert Koekemoer, Zakithi Nene	South Africa	3 May 2026	Gaborone	
4	2:55.20	Luke van Ratingen, Reece Holder, Tom Reynolds, Aidan Murphy	Australia	3 May 2026	Gaborone	
5	2:55.83	Alex Haydock-Wilson, Matthew Hudson-Smith, Lewis Davey, Charles Dobson	Great Britain	10 August 2024	Saint-Denis	
6	2:56.72	Chris Brown, Demetrius Pinder, Michael Mathieu, Ramon Miller	Bahamas	10 August 2012	London	
7	2:56.75	Michael McDonald, Gregory Haughton, Danny McFarlane, Davian Clarke	Jamaica	10 August 1997	Athens	
8	2.57.18	Liemarvin Bonevacia, Terrence Agard, Tony van Diepen, Ramsey Angela	Netherlands	7 August 2021	Tokyo	
9	2:57.75	Jonathan Sacoor, Dylan Borlée, Kévin Borlée, Florent Mabille	Belgium	10 August 2024	Saint-Denis	
10	2:58.00	Piotr Rysiukiewicz, Tomasz Czubak, Piotr Haczek, Robert Maćkowiak	Poland	22 July 1998	New York	

=== Women ===
- Correct as of August 2024.

Rank	Time	Team	Nation	Date	Place	Ref.
1	3:15.17	Tatyana Ledovskaya, Olga Nazarova, Mariya Pinigina, Olga Bryzgina	Soviet Union	1 October 1988	Seoul	
2	3:15.27	Shamier Little, Sydney McLaughlin-Levrone, Gabby Thomas, Alexis Holmes	United States	10 August 2024	Saint-Denis	
3	3:15.92	Gesine Walther, Sabine Busch, Dagmar Rübsam-Neubauer, Marita Koch	German Democratic Republic	3 June 1984	Erfurt	
4	3:18.38	Yelena Ruzina, Tatyana Alekseyeva, Margarita Ponomaryova, Irina Privalova	Russia	22 August 1993	Stuttgart	
5	3:18.71	Rosemarie Whyte, Davita Prendergast, Novlene Williams-Mills, Shericka Williams	Jamaica	3 September 2011	Deagu	
6	3:19.50	Lieke Klaver, Cathelijn Peeters, Lisanne de Witte, Femke Bol	Netherlands	10 August 2024	Saint-Denis	
7	3:19.72	Victoria Ohuruogu, Laviai Nielsen, Nicole Yeargin, Amber Anning	Great Britain	10 August 2024	Saint-Denis	
8	3:19.90	Sophie Becker, Rhasidat Adeleke, Phil Healy, Sharlene Mawdsley	Ireland	10 August 2024	Saint-Denis	
9	3:20.32	Taťána Kocembová, Milena Matějkovičová, Zuzana Moravčíková, Jarmila Kratochvílová	Czechoslovakia	14 August 1983	Helsinki	
10	3:20.53	Natalia Kaczmarek, Iga Baumgart-Witan, Malgorzata Holub-Kowalik, Justyna Swiety-Ersetic	Poland	7 August 2021	Tokyo	

== All-time top 25 (outdoor) ==
=== Men ===
- Updated May 2026.

Rank	Time	Team	Nation	Date	Place	Ref.
1	2:54.29	Andrew Valmon (44.43); Quincy Watts (43.59); Butch Reynolds (43.36); Michael Johnson (42.91)	United States	22 August 1993	Stuttgart	
2	2:54.43	Christopher Bailey (44.45); Vernon Norwood (43.26); Bryce Deadmon (43.54); Rai Benjamin (43.18)	United States	10 August 2024	Saint-Denis	
3	2:54.47	Lee Eppie (44.26); Letsile Tebogo (43.50); Bayapo Ndori (43.62); Collen Kebinatshipi (43.09)	Botswana	3 May 2026	Gaborone	
4	2:54.53	Bayapo Ndori (44.30); Busang Collen Kebinatshipi (43.39); Anthony Pesela (43.80); Letsile Tebogo (43.04)	Botswana	10 August 2024	Saint-Denis	
5	2:55.07	Mthi Mthimkulu (44.40); Lythe Pillay (42.66); Leendert Koekemoer (44.36); Zakithi Nene (43.65)	South Africa	3 May 2026	Gaborone	
6	2:55.20	Luke van Ratingen (44.86); Reece Holder (43.12); Tom Reynolds (43.43); Aidan Murphy (43.79)	Australia	3 May 2026	Gaborone	
7	2:55.39	LaShawn Merritt, Angelo Taylor, David Neville, Jeremy Wariner	United States	23 August 2008	Beijing	
8	2:55.56	LaShawn Merritt, Angelo Taylor, Darold Williamson, Jeremy Wariner	United States	2 September 2007	Osaka	
9	2:55.70	Michael Cherry (43.87); Michael Norman (44.44); Bryce Deadmon (44.03); Rai Benjamin (43.36)	United States	7 August 2021	Tokyo	
10	2:55.74	Andrew Valmon, Quincy Watts, Michael Johnson, Steve Lewis	United States	8 August 1992	Barcelona	
11	2:55.83	Alex Haydock-Wilson (44.51); Matthew Hudson-Smith (43.09); Lewis Davey (44.90); Charles Dobson (43.33)	Great Britain	10 August 2024	Saint-Denis	
11	2:55.91	Otis Harris, Derrick Brew, Jeremy Wariner, Darold Williamson	United States	28 August 2004	Athens	
13	2:55.99	LaMont Smith, Alvin Harrison, Derek Mills, Anthuan Maybank	United States	3 August 1996	Atlanta	
14	2:56.16 A	Vincent Matthews, Ron Freeman, Larry James, Lee Evans	United States	20 October 1968	Mexico City	
15	2:56.16	Danny Everett, Steve Lewis, Kevin Robinzine, Harry Reynolds	United States	1 October 1988	Seoul	
16	2:56.17	Elija Godwin (44.28); Michael Norman (43.64); Bryce Deadmon (43.82); Champion Allison (44.43)	United States	24 July 2022	Eugene	
17	2:56.60	Iwan Thomas, Jamie Baulch, Mark Richardson, Roger Black	Great Britain	3 August 1996	Atlanta	
18	2:56.65	Iwan Thomas, Roger Black, Jamie Baulch, Mark Richardson	Great Britain	10 August 1997	Athens	
19	2:56.69	Fred Kerley (43.44); Michael Cherry (44.63); Wilbert London (44.43); Rai Benjamin (44.19)	United States	6 October 2019	Doha	
20	2:56.72	Chris Brown, Demetrius Pinder, Michael Mathieu, Ramon Miller	Bahamas	10 August 2012	London	
21	2:56.75	Michael McDonald, Gregory Haughton, Danny McFarlane, Davian Clarke	Jamaica	10 August 1997	Athens	
22	2:56.91	Andrew Rock, Derrick Brew, Darold Williamson, Jeremy Wariner	United States	14 August 2005	Helsinki	
23	2:57.05	Bryshon Nellum, Joshua Mance, Tony McQuay, Angelo Taylor	United States	10 August 2012	London	
24	2:57.18	Liemarvin Bonevacia, Terrence Agard, Tony van Diepen, Ramsey Angela	Netherlands	7 August 2021	Tokyo	
25	2:57.25	David Verburg, Tony McQuay, Christian Taylor, LaShawn Merritt	United States	25 May 2014	Nassau	

Note

- A USA team ran 2:54.20 in Uniondale in 1998 but the performance was annulled due to the use of performance-enhancing drugs by Antonio Pettigrew
- A USA team ran 2:56.35 in Sydney in 2000 but the performance was annulled due to the use of performance-enhancing drugs by Antonio Pettigrew
- A USA team ran 2:56.45 in Seville in 1999 but the performance was annulled due to the use of performance-enhancing drugs by Antonio Pettigrew
- A USA team ran 2:56.47 in Athens in 1997 but the performance was annulled due to the use of performance-enhancing drugs by Antonio Pettigrew
- A USA team ran 2:56.60 in Philadelphia in 2000 but the performance was annulled due to the use of performance-enhancing drugs by Antonio Pettigrew

=== Women ===
- Correct as of June 2026.

Rank	Time	Team	Nation	Date	Place	Ref.
1	3:15.17	Tatyana Ledovskaya (50.12); Olga Nazarova (47.82); Mariya Pinigina (49.43); Olha Bryzhina (47.80)	Soviet Union	1 October 1988	Seoul	
2	3:15.27	Shamier Little (49.48); Sydney McLaughlin-Levrone (47.71); Gabby Thomas (49.3); Alexis Holmes (48.78)	United States	10 August 2024	Saint-Denis	
3	3:15.51	Denean Howard-Hill (49.82); Diane Dixon (49.17); Valerie Brisco-Hooks (48.44); Florence Griffith Joyner (48.08)	United States	1 October 1988	Seoul	
4	3:15.92	Gesine Walther, Sabine Busch, Dagmar Rübsam-Neubauer, Marita Koch	German Democratic Republic	3 June 1984	Erfurt	
5	3:16.61	Isabella Whittaker (50.12); Lynna Irby-Jackson (48.71); Aaliyah Butler (49.96); Sydney McLaughlin-Levrone (47.82)	United States	21 September 2025	Tokyo	
6	3:16.71	Gwen Torrence (49.02); Maicel Malone-Wallace (49.43); Natasha Kaiser-Brown (49.50); Jearl Miles Clark (48.76)	United States	22 August 1993	Stuttgart	
7	3:16.85	Sydney McLaughlin (49.96); Allyson Felix (49.58); Dalilah Muhammad (48.97); Athing Mu (48.37)	United States	7 August 2021	Tokyo	
8	3:16.87	Kirsten Emmelmann, Sabine Busch, Petra Müller, Marita Koch	German Democratic Republic	31 August 1986	Stuttgart	
8	3:16.87	DeeDee Trotter (50.19); Allyson Felix (48.19); Francena McCorory (49.39); Sanya Richards-Ross (49.10)	United States	11 August 2012	London	
10	3:17.79	Talitha Diggs (50.50); Abby Steiner (49.99); Britton Wilson (49.39); Sydney McLaughlin (47.91)	United States	24 July 2022	Eugene	
11	3:17.83	Debbie Dunn (50.55); Allyson Felix (48.75); Lashinda Demus (50.10); Sanya Richards-Ross (48.43)	United States	23 August 2009	Berlin	
12	3:17.96	Arkansas Razorbacks; Amber Anning (50.52); Rosey Effiong (49.21); Nickisha Pryce (49.20); Kaylyn Brown (49.05)	United Kingdom; United States; Jamaica; United States	8 June 2024	Eugene	
13	3:18.09	Sanya Richards-Ross (49.30); Allyson Felix (49.33); Jessica Beard (49.95); Francena McCorory (49.51)	United States	3 September 2011	Daegu	
14	3:18.29	Lillie Leatherwood, Sherri Howard, Valerie Brisco-Hooks, Chandra Cheeseborough	United States	11 August 1984	Los Angeles	
14	3:18.29	Dagmar Rübsam-Neubauer, Kirsten Emmelmann, Sabine Busch, Petra Müller	German Democratic Republic	1 October 1988	Seoul	
16	3:18.38	Yelena Ruzina, Tatyana Alekseyeva, Margarita Khromova-Ponomaryova, Irina Privalova	Russia	22 August 1993	Stuttgart	
17	3:18.43	Tatyana Ledovskaya, Lyudmila Dzhigalova, Olga Nazarova, Olha Bryzhina	USSR	1 September 1991	Tokyo	
18	3:18.54	Mary Wineberg (51.00); Allyson Felix (48.55); Monique Henderson (50.06); Sanya Richards-Ross (48.93)	United States	23 August 2008	Beijing	
19	3:18.55	DeeDee Trotter (51.39); Allyson Felix (48.01); Monique Henderson (50.24); Sanya Richards-Ross (48.91)	United States	2 September 2007	Osaka	
20	3:18.58	Irina Nazarova, Nadiya Olizarenko, Mariya Pinigina, Olga Vladykina	USSR	18 August 1985	Moscow	
21	3:18.63	Dagmar Rübsam-Neubauer, Kirsten Emmelmann, Petra Müller, Sabine Busch	German Democratic Republic	6 September 1987	Rome	
22	3:18.71	Rosemarie Whyte, Davita Prendergast, Novlene Williams-Mills, Shericka Williams	Jamaica	3 September 2011	Deagu	
23	3:18.88	Arkansas Razorbacks; Sanaria Butler; Analissa Batista; Kaylyn Brown; Sanu Jallow	United States; United States; United States; The Gambia	13 June 2026	Eugene	
24	3:18.92	Phyllis Francis (49.51); Sydney McLaughlin (49.78); Dalilah Muhammad (49.43); Wadeline Jonathas (50.20)	United States	6 October 2019	Doha	
25	3:19.01	DeeDee Trotter (49.19); Monique Henderson (50.29); Sanya Richards-Ross (49.81); Monique Hennagan (49.72)	United States	28 August 2004	Athens	

Note

- A Russian team ran 3:18.82 in Beijing in 2008 but the performance was annulled due to the use of performance-enhancing drugs by Tatyana Firova

== All-time top 10 by country (indoor) ==
=== Men ===
- Correct as of March 2024.

Rank	Time	Team	Nation	Date	Place	Ref.
1	3:01.39	Illolo Izu, Robert Grant, Devin Dixon, Mylik Kerley	United States	10 March 2018	College Station	
2	3:01.77	Karol Zalewski, Rafał Omelko, Łukasz Krawczuk, Jakub Krzewina	Poland	4 March 2018	Birmingham	
3	3:02.51	Dylan Borlée, Jonathan Borlée, Jonathan Sacoor, Kevin Borlée	Belgium	4 March 2018	Birmingham	
4	3:02.52	Deon Lendore, Jereem Richards, Asa Guevara, Lalonde Gordon	Trinidad and Tobago	4 March 2018	Birmingham	
5	3:03.05	Rico Lieder, Jens Carlowitz, Karsten Just, Thomas Schönlebe	Germany	10 March 1991	Sevilla	
6	3:03.20	Allyn Condon, Solomon Wariso, Adrian Patrick, Jamie Baulch	Great Britain	7 March 1999	Maebashi	
7	3:03.69	Errol Nolan, Allodin Fothergill, Akheem Gauntlett, Edino Steele	Jamaica	9 March 2014	Sopot	
8	3:04.09	Daniel Němeček, Patrik Šorm, Jan Tesař, Pavel Maslák	Czech Republic	8 March 2015	Prague	
9	3:04.25	Liemarvin Bonevacia, Ramsey Angela, Terrence Agard, Tony van Diepen	Netherlands	3 March 2024	Glasgow	
10	3:04.75	Michael Mathieu, Alonzo Russell, Shavez Hart, Chris Brown	Bahamas	20 March 2016	Portland	

=== Women ===
- Correct as of March 2025.

Rank	Time	Team	Nation	Date	Place	Ref.
1	3:23.37	Olesya Krasnomovets-Forsheva, Olga Zaytseva, Olga Kotlyarova, Yuliya Gushchina	Russia	28 January 2006	Glasgow	
2	3:23.85	Quanera Hayes, Georganne Moline, Shakima Wimbley, Courtney Okolo	United States	4 March 2018	Birmingham	
3	3:24.34	Lieke Klaver, Nina Franke, Cathelijn Peeters, Femke Bol	Netherlands	9 March 2025	Apeldoorn	
4	3:24.89	Lina Nielsen, Hannah Kelly, Emily Newnham, Amber Anning	Great Britain	9 March 2025	Apeldoorn	
5	3:25.31	Lada Vondrová, Nikoleta Jíchová, Tereza Petržilková, Lurdes Gloria Manuel	Czech Republic	9 March 2025	Apeldoorn	
6	3:25.68	Paula Sevilla, Eva Santidrián, Daniela Fra, Blanca Hervas	Spain	9 March 2025	Apeldoorn	
7	3:25.80	Camille Seri, Louise Maraval, Marjorie Veyssiere, Amandine Brossier	France	9 March 2025	Apeldoorn	
8	3:26.09	Justyna Święty-Ersetic, Patrycja Wyciszkiewicz, Aleksandra Gaworska, Małgorzata Hołub-Kowalik	Poland	4 March 2018	Birmingham	
9	3:26.54	Patricia Hall, Anneisha McLaughlin, Kaliese Spencer, Stephenie Ann McPherson	Jamaica	9 March 2014	Sopot	
10	3:26.87	Susan Andrews, Tania Van Heer, Tamsyn Lewis, Cathy Freeman	Australia	7 March 1999	Maebashi	

== All-time top 25 (indoor) ==
=== Men ===
- Updated March 2026.

Rank	Time	Team	Nation	Date	Place	Ref.
1	3:00.77	USC Trojans; Zach Shinnick (46.24); Rai Benjamin (44.35); Ricky Morgan Jr. (45.67); Michael Norman (44.52)	United States; Antigua and Barbuda; United States; United States	10 March 2018	College Station	
2	3:01.09	Arkansas Razorbacks; Connor Washington; James Benson; Ayden Owens-Delerme; Christopher Bailey	United States; United States; Puerto Rico; United States	4 February 2023	Albuquerque	
3	3:01.39	Texas A&M Aggies; Illolo Izu; Robert Grant; Devin Dixon; Mylik Kerley	United States	10 March 2018	College Station	
4	3:01.43	Florida Gators; Kunle Fasasi; Grant Holloway; Chantz Sawyers; Benjamin Lobo Vedel	Nigeria; United States; Jamaica; Denmark	10 March 2018	College Station	
5	3:01.51	Houston Cougars; Amere Lattin; Obi Ogbokwe; Jermaine Holt; Kahmari Montgomery	United States	9 February 2019	Clemson	
6	3:01.52	Justin Robinson; Chris Robinson; Demarius Smith; Khaleb McRae	United States	22 March 2026	Toruń	
7	3:01.56	Texas A&M Aggies; Illolo Izu; Bryce Deadmon; Kyree Johnson; Devon Dixon	United States	9 February 2019	Clemson	
8	3:01.77	Karol Zalewski; Rafał Omelko; Łukasz Krawczuk; Jakub Krzewina	Poland	4 March 2018	Birmingham	
9	3:01.78	Alabama Crimson Tide; Chris Robinson; Demetrius Jackson; Tarsis Gracious Orogot; Khaleb McRae	United States; United States; Uganda; United States	25 February 2023	Fayetteville	
10	3:01.96	Kerron Clement; Jeremy Wariner; Wallace Spearmon; Darold Williamson	United States	11 February 2006	Fayetteville	
11	3:01.97	Fred Kerley; Michael Cherry; Aldrich Bailey Jr. Vernon Norwood	United States	4 March 2018	Birmingham	
12	3:01.98	USC Trojans; Zachary Shinnick; Rai Benjamin; Ricky Morgan; Michael Norman	United States	10 February 2018	Clemson	
13	3:02.09	Arkansas Razorbacks; Connor Washington; James Benson; Ayden Owens-Delerme; Christopher Bailey	United States; United States; Puerto Rico; United States	11 March 2023	Albuquerque	
14	3:02.13	Kyle Clemons; David Verburg; Kind Butler; Calvin Smith	United States	9 March 2014	Sopot	
15	3:02.18	Florida Gators; Jacory Patterson; Emmanuel Bamidele; Jevaughn Powell; Ryan Willie	United States; Nigeria; Jamaica; United States	11 February 2023	Fayetteville	
16	3:02.21	Texas A&M Aggies Auhmad Robinson; Hossam Hatib; Antonie Mathys Nortje; Cutler Zamzow	United States; Morocco; South Africa; United States	15 February 2025	Clemson	
17	3:02.23	Florida Gators; Kunle Fasasi; Grant Holloway; Chantz Sawyers; Benjamin Lobo Vedel	Nigeria; United States; Jamaica; Denmark	10 February 2018	Clemson	
18	3:02.35	Texas A&M Aggies; Illolo Izu; Robert Grant; Devon Dixon; My'Lik Kerley	United States	25 February 2018	College Station	
18	3:02.35	Arizona State Sun Devils; Justin Robinson; Kaleb Simpson; Jayden Davis; Gamali Felix	United States; United States; United States; Grenada	9 March 2024	Boston	
20	3:02.45	Kyle Clemons; Calvin Smith; Chris Giesting; Vernon Norwood	United States	20 March 2016	Portland	
21	3:02.51	Dylan Borlée; Jonathan Borlée; Jonathan Sacoor; Kevin Borlée	Belgium	4 March 2018	Birmingham	
22	3:02.52	Texas A&M Aggies; Fred Kerley; Richard Rose; Devon Dixon; My'Lik Kerley	United States	28 January 2017	Fayetteville	
22	3:02.52	Deon Lendore; Jereem Richards; Asa Guevara; Lalonde Gordon	Trinidad and Tobago	4 March 2018	Birmingham	
24	3:02.53	Florida Gators; Jevaughn Powell; Robert Gregory; Jenoah McKiver; Reheem Hayles	Jamaica; United States; United States; Jamaica	9 March 2024	Boston	
25	3:02.54	Jonathan Sacoor (46.21; Dylan Borlée (45.67); Christian Iguacel (45.78); Alexander Doom (44.88)	Belgium	3 March 2024	Glasgow	

=== Women ===
- Updated March 2026.

Rank	Time	Team	Nation	Date	Place	Ref.
1	3:21.75 A	Arkansas Razorbacks; Amber Anning 51.47; Joanne Reid 50.52; Rosey Effiong 50.57; Britton Wilson 49.20	England; Jamaica; United States; United States	11 March 2023	Albuquerque	
2	3:23.37	Olesya Krasnomovets-Forsheva; Olga Zaytseva; Olga Kotlyarova; Yuliya Gushchina	Russia	28 January 2006	Glasgow	
3	3:23.68	Arkansas Razorbacks; Kaylyn Brown 52.09; Analisse Batista 50.73; Sanu Jallow 50.51; Sanaria Butler 50.31	United States; United States; The Gambia; United States	14 March 2026	Fayetteville	
4	3:23.85	Quanera Hayes; Georganne Moline; Shakima Wimbley; Courtney Okolo	United States	4 March 2018	Birmingham	
5	3:23.88	Olesya Krasnomovets-Forsheva; Olga Kotlyarova; Tatyana Levina; Natalya Nazarova	Russia	7 March 2004	Budapest	
6	3:24.09	Arkansas Razorbacks; Rosey Effiong; Jayla Hollis; Shafiqua Maloney; Britton Wilson	United States; United States; Saint Vincent and the Grenadines; United States	26 February 2022	College Station	
7	3:24.25	Tatyana Chebykina; Svetlana Goncharenko; Olga Kotlyarova; Natalya Nazarova	Russia	7 March 1999	Maebashi	
8	3:24.34	Lieke Klaver (50.98); Nina Franke (51.83); Cathelijn Peeters (51.11); Femke Bol (50.42)	Netherlands	9 March 2025	Apeldoorn	
9	3:24.48	Georgia Bulldogs; Shaqueena Foote 51.59; Skylar Brazzell 52.34; Vimbayi Maisvorewa 50.50; Dejanea Oakley 50.06	Jamaica; United States; Zimbabwe; Jamaica	14 March 2026	Fayetteville	
10	3:24.83	Natasha Hastings; Joanna Atkins; Francena McCorory; Cassandra Tate	United States	9 March 2014	Sopot	
11	3:24.89	Lina Nielsen (51.24); Hannah Kelly (51.85); Emily Newnham (51.24); Amber Anning (50.56)	Great Britain	9 March 2025	Apeldoorn	
12	3:24.91	Tatyana Levina; Natalya Nazarova; Olesya Krasnomovets-Forsheva; Natayla Antyukh	Russia	12 March 2006	Moscow	
13	3:25.07	Lieke Klaver (50.26); Cathelijn Peeters (51.99); Lisanne de Witte (52.28); Femke Bol (50.54)	Netherlands	3 March 2024	Glasgow	
14	3:25.20	Arkansas Razorbacks; Joanne Reid; Sanaria Butler; Kaylyn Brown; Isabella Whittaker	Jamaica; United States; United States; United States	15 March 2025	Virginia Beach	
15	3:25.31	Lada Vondrová (52.30); Nikoleta Jíchová (51.08); Tereza Petržilková (52.11); Lurdes Gloria Manuel (49.82)	Czech Republic	9 March 2025	Apeldoorn	
16	3:25.34	Quanera Hayes (52.33); Talitha Diggs (50.50); Bailey Lear (52.02); Alexis Holmes (50.49)	United States	3 March 2024	Glasgow	
17	3:25.43	Texas A&M Aggies; Laila Owens; Tierra Robinson-Jones; Syaira Richardson; Charokee Young	United States; United States; United States; Jamaica	26 February 2022	College Station	
18	3:25.59	Arkansas Razorbacks; Rosey Effiong; Amber Anning; Nickisha Pryce; Sanu Jallow	United States; Great Britain; Jamaica; United States	27 January 2024	Fayetteville	
19	3:25.66	Lieke Klaver; Eveline Saalberg; Cathelijn Peeters; Femke Bol	Netherlands	5 March 2023	Istanbul	
20	3:25.67 A	Texas Longhorns; Rachel Helbling; Kennedy Simon; Julien Alfred; Rhasidat Adeleke	United States; United States; Saint Lucia; Ireland	11 March 2023	Albuquerque	
21	3:25.68	Paula Sevilla (51.54); Eva Santidrián (51.51); Daniela Fra (51.26); Blanca Hervas (51.37)	Spain	9 March 2025	Apeldoorn	
22	3:25.73	Cique Elite; Quanera Hayes; Maya Singletary; Karimah Davis	United States	14 February 2025	Clemson	
23	3:25.80	Camille Seri (52.32); Louise Maraval (51.03); Marjorie Veyssiere (52.65); Amandine Brossier (49.80)	France	9 March 2025	Apeldoorn	
24	3:25.81	Bailey Lear; Rosey Effiong; Paris Peoples; Shamier Little	United States	22 March 2026	Toruń	
25	3:25.89	Kentucky Wildcats; Megan Moss; Abby Steiner; Karimah Davis; Alexis Holmes	Bahamas; United States; United States; United States	26 February 2022	College Station	

== Olympic medalists ==
=== Men ===
Games	Gold	Silver	Bronze
1912 Stockholm	United States; Mel Sheppard; Edward Lindberg; Ted Meredith; Charles Reidpath	France; Charles Lelong; Robert Schurrer; Pierre Failliot; Charles Poulenard	Great Britain; George Nicol; Ernest Henley; James Soutter; Cyril Seedhouse
1920 Antwerp	Great Britain; Cecil Griffiths; Robert Lindsay; John Ainsworth-Davis; Guy Butler	South Africa; Henry Dafel; Clarence Oldfield; Jack Oosterlaak; Bevil Rudd	France; Géo André; Gaston Féry; Maurice Delvart; André Devaux
1924 Paris	United States; Commodore Cochran; Alan Helffrich; Oliver Macdonald; William Stevenson	Sweden; Artur Svensson; Erik Byléhn; Gustaf Wejnarth; Nils Engdahl	Great Britain; Edward Toms; George Renwick; Richard Ripley; Guy Butler
1928 Amsterdam	United States; George Baird; Emerson Spencer; Fred Alderman; Ray Barbuti	Germany; Otto Neumann; Harry Werner Storz; Richard Krebs; Hermann Engelhard	Canada; Alex Wilson; Phil Edwards; Stanley Glover; James Ball
1932 Los Angeles	United States; Ivan Fuqua; Ed Ablowich; Karl Warner; Bill Carr	Great Britain; Crew Stoneley; Tommy Hampson; David Burghley; Godfrey Rampling	Canada; Ray Lewis; James Ball; Phil Edwards; Alex Wilson
1936 Berlin	Great Britain; Freddie Wolff; Godfrey Rampling; Bill Roberts; Godfrey Brown	United States; Harold Cagle; Robert Young; Edward O’Brien; Al Fitch	Germany; Helmut Hamann; Friedrich von Stülpnagel; Harry Voigt; Rudolf Harbig
1948 London	United States; Arthur Harnden; Cliff Bourland; Roy Cochran; Mal Whitfield	France; Jean Kerebel; Francis Schewetta; Robert Chef d'Hôtel; Jacques Lunis	Sweden; Kurt Lundquist; Lars-Erik Wolfbrandt; Folke Alnevik; Rune Larsson
1952 Helsinki	Jamaica; Arthur Wint; Leslie Laing; Herb McKenley; George Rhoden	United States; Ollie Matson; Gene Cole; Charles Moore; Mal Whitfield	Germany; Hans Geister; Günther Steines; Heinz Ulzheimer; Karl-Friedrich Haas
1956 Melbourne	United States; Lou Jones; Jesse Mashburn; Charles Jenkins; Tom Courtney	Australia; Leon Gregory; David Lean; Kevan Gosper; Graham Gipson	Great Britain; Peter Higgins; Michael Wheeler; John Salisbury; Derek Johnson
1960 Rome	United States; Jack Yerman; Earl Young; Glenn Davis; Otis Davis	United Team of Germany; Hans-Joachim Reske; Manfred Kinder; Johannes Kaiser; Carl Kaufmann	British West Indies; Malcolm Spence; Jim Wedderburn; Keith Gardner; George Kerr
1964 Tokyo	United States; Ollan Cassell; Mike Larrabee; Ulis Williams; Henry Carr	Great Britain; Tim Graham; Adrian Metcalfe; John Cooper; Robbie Brightwell	Trinidad and Tobago; Edwin Skinner; Kent Bernard; Edwin Roberts; Wendell Mottley
1968 Mexico City	United States; Vincent Matthews; Ron Freeman; Larry James; Lee Evans	Kenya; Daniel Rudisha; Munyoro Nyamau; Naftali Bon; Charles Asati	West Germany; Helmar Müller; Manfred Kinder; Gerhard Hennige; Martin Jellinghaus
1972 Munich	Kenya; Charles Asati; Munyoro Nyamau; Robert Ouko; Julius Sang	Great Britain; Martin Reynolds; Alan Pascoe; David Hemery; David Jenkins	France; Gilles Bertould; Daniel Velasques; Francis Kerbiriou; Jacques Carette
1976 Montreal	United States; Herman Frazier; Benny Brown; Fred Newhouse; Maxie Parks	Poland; Ryszard Podlas; Jan Werner; Zbigniew Jaremski; Jerzy Pietrzyk	West Germany; Franz-Peter Hofmeister; Lothar Krieg; Harald Schmid; Bernd Herrmann
1980 Moscow	Soviet Union; Remigijus Valiulis; Mikhail Linge; Nikolay Chernetskiy; Viktor Markin	East Germany; Klaus Thiele; Andreas Knebel; Frank Schaffer; Volker Beck	Italy; Stefano Malinverni; Mauro Zuliani; Roberto Tozzi; Pietro Mennea
1984 Los Angeles	United States; Sunder Nix; Ray Armstead; Alonzo Babers; Antonio McKay	Great Britain; Kriss Akabusi; Garry Cook; Todd Bennett; Phil Brown	Nigeria; Sunday Uti; Moses Ugbisien; Rotimi Peters; Innocent Egbunike
1988 Seoul	United States; Danny Everett; Steve Lewis; Kevin Robinzine; Butch Reynolds	Jamaica; Howard Davis; Devon Morris; Winthrop Graham; Bert Cameron	West Germany; Norbert Dobeleit; Edgar Itt; Jörg Vaihinger; Ralf Lübke
1992 Barcelona	United States; Andrew Valmon; Quincy Watts; Michael Johnson; Steve Lewis; Darnell Hall; Charles Jenkins Jr.	Cuba; Lázaro Martínez; Héctor Herrera; Norberto Téllez; Roberto Hernández	Great Britain; Roger Black; David Grindley; Kriss Akabusi; John Regis; Du'aine Ladejo; Mark Richardson
1996 Atlanta	United States; LaMont Smith; Alvin Harrison; Derek Mills; Anthuan Maybank; Jason Rouser	Great Britain; Iwan Thomas; Jamie Baulch; Mark Richardson; Roger Black; Du'aine Ladejo; Mark Hylton	Jamaica; Michael McDonald; Roxbert Martin; Greg Haughton; Davian Clarke; Dennis Blake; Garth Robinson
2000 Sydney	Nigeria; Clement Chukwu; Jude Monye; Sunday Bada; Enefiok Udo-Obong; Nduka Awazie; Fidelis Gadzama	Jamaica; Michael Blackwood; Greg Haughton; Christopher Williams; Danny McFarlane; Sanjay Ayre; Michael McDonald	Bahamas; Avard Moncur; Troy McIntosh; Carl Oliver; Chris Brown
2004 Athens	United States; Otis Harris; Derrick Brew; Jeremy Wariner; Darold Williamson; Kelly Willie; Andrew Rock	Australia; John Steffensen; Mark Ormrod; Patrick Dwyer; Clinton Hill	Nigeria; James Godday; Musa Audu; Saul Weigopwa; Enefiok Udo-Obong
2008 Beijing	United States; LaShawn Merritt; Angelo Taylor; David Neville; Jeremy Wariner; Kerron Clement; Reggie Witherspoon	Bahamas; Andretti Bain; Michael Mathieu; Andrae Williams; Chris Brown; Avard Moncur; Ramon Miller	Great Britain; Martyn Rooney; Andrew Steele; Robert Tobin; Michael Bingham
2012 London	Bahamas; Chris Brown; Michael Mathieu; Ramon Miller; Demetrius Pinder	United States; Joshua Mance; Manteo Mitchell; Tony McQuay; Bryshon Nellum; Angelo Taylor	Trinidad and Tobago; Ade Alleyne-Forte; Lalonde Gordon; Deon Lendore; Jarrin Solomon
2016 Rio de Janeiro	United States; Arman Hall; Tony McQuay; Gil Roberts; LaShawn Merritt; Kyle Clemons*; David Verburg*	Jamaica; Peter Matthews; Nathon Allen; Fitzroy Dunkley; Javon Francis; Rusheen McDonald*	Bahamas; Alonzo Russell; Michael Mathieu; Steven Gardiner; Chris Brown; Stephen Newbold*
2020 Tokyo	United States; Michael Cherry; Michael Norman; Bryce Deadmon; Rai Benjamin; Trevor Stewart*; Randolph Ross*; Vernon Norwood*	Netherlands; Liemarvin Bonevacia; Terrence Agard; Tony van Diepen; Ramsey Angela; Jochem Dobber*	Botswana; Isaac Makwala; Baboloki Thebe; Zibane Ngozi; Bayapo Ndori
2024 Paris	United States; Christopher Bailey; Vernon Norwood; Bryce Deadmon; Rai Benjamin; Quincy Wilson*	Botswana; Bayapo Ndori; Busang Collen Kebinatshipi; Anthony Pesela; Letsile Tebogo	Great Britain; Alex Haydock-Wilson; Matthew Hudson-Smith; Lewis Davey; Charlie Dobson; Samuel Reardon*; Toby Harries*
2028 Los Angeles			

Note: * Indicates athletes who ran in preliminary rounds and also received medals.

The world record is World Athletics Relays Records 2:57.25 T. Robinson Stadium, Nassau (BAB)

=== Women ===
Games	Gold	Silver	Bronze
1972 Munich	East Germany; Dagmar Käsling; Rita Kühne; Helga Seidler; Monika Zehrt	United States; Mable Fergerson; Madeline Manning; Cheryl Toussaint; Kathy Hammond	West Germany; Anette Rückes; Inge Bödding; Hildegard Falck; Rita Wilden
1976 Montreal	East Germany; Doris Maletzki; Brigitte Rohde; Ellen Streidt; Christina Brehmer	United States; Debra Sapenter; Sheila Ingram; Pamela Jiles; Rosalyn Bryant	Soviet Union; Inta Kļimoviča; Lyudmila Aksyonova; Natalya Sokolova; Nadezhda Ilyina
1980 Moscow	Soviet Union; Tatyana Prorochenko; Tatyana Goyshchik; Nina Zyuskova; Irina Nazarova	East Germany; Gabriele Löwe; Barbara Krug; Christina Lathan; Marita Koch	Great Britain; Linsey MacDonald; Michelle Probert; Joslyn Hoyte-Smith; Donna Hartley
1984 Los Angeles	United States; Lillie Leatherwood; Sherri Howard; Valerie Brisco-Hooks; Chandra Cheeseborough; Diane Dixon*; Denean Howard*	Canada; Charmaine Crooks; Jillian Richardson; Molly Killingbeck; Marita Payne; Dana Wright*	West Germany; Heike Schulte-Mattler; Ute Thimm; Heidi-Elke Gaugel; Gaby Bußmann
1988 Seoul	Soviet Union; Tatyana Ledovskaya; Olga Nazarova; Mariya Pinigina; Olha Bryzhina; Lyudmyla Dzhyhalova*	United States; Denean Howard; Diane Dixon; Valerie Brisco-Hooks; Florence Griffith Joyner; Sherri Howard*; Lillie Leatherwood*	East Germany; Dagmar Neubauer-Rübsam; Kirsten Emmelmann; Sabine Busch; Petra Müller; Grit Breuer*
1992 Barcelona	Unified Team; Yelena Ruzina; Lyudmyla Dzhyhalova; Olga Nazarova; Olha Bryzhina; Marina Shmonina*; Liliya Nurutdinova*	United States; Natasha Kaiser-Brown; Gwen Torrence; Jearl Miles; Rochelle Stevens; Denean Howard-Hill*; Dannette Young*	Great Britain; Phylis Smith; Sandra Douglas; Jennifer Stoute; Sally Gunnell
1996 Atlanta	United States; Rochelle Stevens; Maicel Malone; Kim Graham; Jearl Miles; Linetta Wilson*	Nigeria; Olabisi Afolabi; Fatima Yusuf; Charity Opara; Falilat Ogunkoya	Germany; Uta Rohländer; Linda Kisabaka; Anja Rücker; Grit Breuer
2000 Sydney	United States; Jearl Miles Clark; Monique Hennagan; LaTasha Colander; ~~Marion Jones~~^{[nb1]} Andrea Anderson*	Jamaica; Sandie Richards; Catherine Scott; Deon Hemmings; Lorraine Graham; Charmaine Howell*; Michelle Burgher*	Russia; Yuliya Sotnikova; Svetlana Goncharenko; Olga Kotlyarova; Irina Privalova; Natalya Nazarova*; Olesya Zykina*
2004 Athens	United States; DeeDee Trotter; Monique Henderson; Sanya Richards; Monique Hennagan; ~~Crystal Cox~~^{[nb2]}* Moushaumi Robinson*	Russia; Olesya Krasnomovets; Natalya Nazarova; Olesya Zykina; Natalya Antyukh; Tatyana Firova*; Natalya Ivanova*	Jamaica; Novlene Williams; Michelle Burgher; Nadia Davy; Sandie Richards; Ronetta Smith*
2008 Beijing^{[a]}	United States; Mary Wineberg; Allyson Felix; Monique Henderson; Sanya Richards; Natasha Hastings*	Jamaica; Shericka Williams; Shereefa Lloyd; Rosemarie Whyte; Novlene Williams; Bobby-Gaye Wilkins*	Great Britain; Christine Ohuruogu; Kelly Sotherton; Marilyn Okoro; Nicola Sanders
2012 London^{[b]}	United States; DeeDee Trotter; Allyson Felix; Francena McCorory; Sanya Richards-Ross; Keshia Baker*; Diamond Dixon*	Jamaica; Christine Day; Rosemarie Whyte; Shericka Williams; Novlene Williams-Mills; Shereefa Lloyd*; ~~Dominique Blake~~^{[nb3]}	Ukraine; Alina Lohvynenko; Olha Zemlyak; Hanna Yaroshchuk; Nataliya Pyhyda
2016 Rio de Janeiro	United States; Allyson Felix; Phyllis Francis; Natasha Hastings; Courtney Okolo; Taylor Ellis-Watson*; Francena McCorory*	Jamaica; Stephenie Ann McPherson; Anneisha McLaughlin-Whilby; Shericka Jackson; Novlene Williams-Mills; Christine Day*; Chrisann Gordon*	Great Britain; Eilidh Doyle; Anyika Onuora; Emily Diamond; Christine Ohuruogu; Kelly Massey*
2020 Tokyo	United States; Sydney McLaughlin; Allyson Felix; Dalilah Muhammad; Athing Mu; Kendall Ellis*; Lynna Irby*; Wadeline Jonathas*; Kaylin Whitney*	Poland; Natalia Kaczmarek; Iga Baumgart-Witan; Małgorzata Hołub-Kowalik; Justyna Święty-Ersetic; Anna Kiełbasińska*	Jamaica; Roneisha McGregor; Janieve Russell; Shericka Jackson; Candice McLeod; Junelle Bromfield*; Stacey-Ann Williams*
2024 Paris	United States; Shamier Little; Sydney McLaughlin-Levrone; Gabby Thomas; Alexis Holmes; Quanera Hayes*; Aaliyah Butler*; Kaylyn Brown*	Netherlands; Lieke Klaver; Cathelijn Peeters; Lisanne de Witte; Femke Bol; Eveline Saalberg*; Myrte van der Schoot*	Great Britain; Victoria Ohuruogu; Laviai Nielsen; Nicole Yeargin; Amber Anning; Yemi Mary John*; Hannah Kelly*; Jodie Williams*; Lina Nielsen*
2028 Los Angeles			

Note: * Indicates athletes who ran in preliminary rounds and also received medals.

- ^{nb1} Marion Jones was stripped of her Olympic medal in 2000.
- ^{nb2} Crystal Cox was stripped of her Olympic medal in 2004.
- ^{nb3} Dominique Blake was accidentally given her Olympic medal and she returned it in 2017.
- ^{a} Original silver medalists, Russia, and 4th place finishers, Belarus, were stripped of their results for doping offenses. Following reallocation, Jamaica were promoted to the silver medal, and Great Britain to the bronze.
- ^{b} Original silver medalists, Russia, were stripped of their medal for doping offenses. Following reallocation, Jamaica will be promoted to the silver medal, and Ukraine to the bronze.

== World Championships medalists ==
=== Men ===
Championships	Gold	Silver	Bronze
1983 Helsinki	Soviet Union (URS); Sergey Lovachov; Aliaksandr Trashchyla; Nikolay Chernetskiy; Viktor Markin	West Germany (FRG); Erwin Skamrahl; Jörg Vaihinger; Harald Schmid; Hartmut Weber; Martin Weppler*; Edgar Nakladal*	Great Britain (GBR); Ainsley Bennett; Garry Cook; Todd Bennett; Phil Brown; Kriss Akabusi*
1987 Rome	United States (USA); Danny Everett; Roddie Haley; Antonio McKay; Butch Reynolds; Michael Franks*; Raymond Pierre*	Great Britain (GBR); Derek Redmond; Kriss Akabusi; Roger Black; Phil Brown; Todd Bennett*; Mark Thomas*	Cuba (CUB); Leandro Peñalver; Agustín Pavó; Lázaro Martínez; Roberto Hernández
1991 Tokyo	Great Britain (GBR); Roger Black; Derek Redmond; John Regis; Kriss Akabusi; Ade Mafe*; Mark Richardson*	United States (USA); Andrew Valmon; Quincy Watts; Danny Everett; Antonio Pettigrew; Jeff Reynolds*; Mark Everett*	Jamaica (JAM); Patrick O'Connor; Devon Morris; Winthrop Graham; Seymour Fagan; Howard Burnett*
1993 Stuttgart	United States (USA); Andrew Valmon; Quincy Watts; Butch Reynolds; Michael Johnson; Antonio Pettigrew*; Derek Mills*	Kenya (KEN); Kennedy Ochieng; Simon Kemboi; Abednego Matilu; Samson Kitur	Germany (GER); Rico Lieder; Karsten Just; Olaf Hense; Thomas Schönlebe
1995 Gothenburg	United States (USA); Marlon Ramsey; Derek Mills; Butch Reynolds; Michael Johnson; Kevin Lyles*; Darnell Hall*	Jamaica (JAM); Michael McDonald; Davian Clarke; Danny McFarlane; Greg Haughton; Dennis Blake*	Nigeria (NGR); Udeme Ekpeyong; Kunle Adejuyigbe; Jude Monye; Sunday Bada
1997 Athens^{dq1}	Great Britain (GBR); Iwan Thomas; Roger Black; Jamie Baulch; Mark Richardson; Mark Hylton*	Jamaica (JAM); Michael McDonald; Greg Haughton; Danny McFarlane; Davian Clarke; Linval Laird*	Poland (POL); Tomasz Czubak; Piotr Rysiukiewicz; Piotr Haczek; Robert Maćkowiak
1999 Seville^{dq2}	Poland (POL); Tomasz Czubak; Robert Maćkowiak; Jacek Bocian; Piotr Haczek; Piotr Długosielski*	Jamaica (JAM); Michael McDonald; Greg Haughton; Danny McFarlane; Davian Clarke; Paston Coke*; Omar A. Brown*	South Africa (RSA); Jopie van Oudtshoorn; Hendrick Mokganyetsi; Adriaan Botha; Arnaud Malherbe
2001 Edmonton^{dq3}	Bahamas (BAH); Avard Moncur; Chris Brown; Troy McIntosh; Timothy Munnings; Carl Oliver*	Jamaica (JAM); Brandon Simpson; Christopher Williams; Greg Haughton; Danny McFarlane; Michael Blackwood*; Mario Watts*	Poland (POL); Rafał Wieruszewski; Piotr Haczek; Piotr Długosielski; Piotr Rysiukiewicz; Jacek Bocian*
2003 Saint-Denis^{dq4}	France (FRA); Leslie Djhone; Naman Keïta; Stéphane Diagana; Marc Raquil; Ahmed Douhou*	Jamaica (JAM); Brandon Simpson; Danny McFarlane; Davian Clarke; Michael Blackwood; Michael Campbell*; Lansford Spence*	Bahamas (BAH); Avard Moncur; Dennis Darling; Nathaniel McKinney; Chris Brown; Carl Oliver*
2005 Helsinki	United States (USA); Andrew Rock; Derrick Brew; Darold Williamson; Jeremy Wariner; Miles Smith*; LaShawn Merritt*	Bahamas (BAH); Nathaniel McKinney; Avard Moncur; Andrae Williams; Chris Brown; Troy McIntosh*	Jamaica (JAM); Sanjay Ayre; Brandon Simpson; Lansford Spence; Davian Clarke; Michael Blackwood*
2007 Osaka	United States (USA); LaShawn Merritt; Angelo Taylor; Darold Williamson; Jeremy Wariner; Bershawn Jackson*; Kerron Clement*	Bahamas (BAH); Avard Moncur; Michael Mathieu; Andrae Williams; Chris Brown; Nathaniel McKinney*	Poland (POL); Marek Plawgo; Daniel Dąbrowski; Marcin Marciniszyn; Kacper Kozłowski; Rafał Wieruszewski*; Witold Bańka*
2009 Berlin	United States (USA); Angelo Taylor; Jeremy Wariner; Kerron Clement; LaShawn Merritt; Lionel Larry*; Bershawn Jackson*	Great Britain (GBR); Conrad Williams; Michael Bingham; Robert Tobin; Martyn Rooney; Dai Greene*	Australia (AUS); John Steffensen; Ben Offereins; Tristan Thomas; Sean Wroe; Joel Milburn*
2011 Daegu	United States (USA); Greg Nixon; Bershawn Jackson; Angelo Taylor; LaShawn Merritt; Jamaal Torrance*; Michael Berry*	South Africa (RSA); Shane Victor; Ofentse Mogawane; Willem de Beer; L. J. van Zyl; Oscar Pistorius*	Jamaica (JAM); Allodin Fothergill; Jermaine Gonzales; Riker Hylton; Leford Green; Lansford Spence*
2013 Moscow^{dq5}	United States (USA); David Verburg; Tony McQuay; Arman Hall; LaShawn Merritt; James Harris*; Joshua Mance*	Jamaica (JAM); Rusheen McDonald; Edino Steele; Omar Johnson; Javon Francis; Javere Bell*	Great Britain (GBR); Conrad Williams; Martyn Rooney; Michael Bingham; Nigel Levine; Jamie Bowie*
2015 Beijing	United States (USA); David Verburg; Tony McQuay; Bryshon Nellum; LaShawn Merritt; Kyle Clemons*; Vernon Norwood*	Trinidad and Tobago (TRI); Renny Quow; Lalonde Gordon; Deon Lendore; Machel Cedenio; Jarrin Solomon*	Great Britain (GBR); Rabah Yousif; Delano Williams; Jarryd Dunn; Martyn Rooney
2017 London	Trinidad and Tobago (TRI); Jarrin Solomon; Jereem Richards; Machel Cedenio; Lalonde Gordon; Renny Quow*	United States (USA); Wil London; Gil Roberts; Michael Cherry; Fred Kerley; Bryshon Nellum*; Tony McQuay*	Great Britain (GBR); Matthew Hudson-Smith; Rabah Yousif; Dwayne Cowan; Martyn Rooney; Jack Green*
2019 Doha	United States (USA); Fred Kerley; Michael Cherry; Wil London; Rai Benjamin; Tyrell Richard*; Vernon Norwood*; Nathan Strother*	Jamaica (JAM); Akeem Bloomfield; Nathon Allen; Terry Thomas; Demish Gaye; Javon Francis*	Belgium (BEL); Jonathan Sacoor; Robin Vanderbemden; Dylan Borlée; Kevin Borlée; Julien Watrin*
2022 Eugene	United States (USA); Elija Godwin; Michael Norman; Bryce Deadmon; Champion Allison; Trevor Bassitt*; Vernon Norwood*	Jamaica (JAM); Akeem Bloomfield; Nathon Allen; Jevaughn Powell; Christopher Taylor; Karayme Bartley*; Anthony Cox*	Belgium (BEL); Dylan Borlée; Julien Watrin; Alexander Doom; Kevin Borlée; Jonathan Sacoor*
2023 Budapest	United States (USA); Quincy Hall; Vernon Norwood; Justin Robinson; Rai Benjamin; Trevor Bassitt*; Matthew Boling*; Christopher Bailey*	France (FRA); Ludvy Vaillant; Gilles Biron; David Sombé; Téo Andant; Loïc Prévot*	Great Britain (GBR); Alex Haydock-Wilson; Charlie Dobson; Lewis Davey; Rio Mitcham
2025 Tokyo	Botswana (BOT); Lee Bhekempilo Eppie; Letsile Tebogo; Bayapo Ndori; Busang Collen Kebinatshipi; Leungo Scotch*	United States (USA); Vernon Norwood; Jacory Patterson; Khaleb McRae; Rai Benjamin; Christopher Bailey*; Demarius Smith*; Bryce Deadmon*; Jenoah McKiver*	South Africa (RSA); Lythe Pillay; Udeme Okon; Wayde van Niekerk; Zakithi Nene; Gardeo Isaacs*; Leendert Koekemoer*

Note: * Indicates athletes who ran only in the preliminary round and also received medals.

- ^{dq1} The United States team (Jerome Young, Antonio Pettigrew, Chris Jones and Tyree Washington) originally won the 1997 World Championships in a time of 2:56.47 minutes, but was disqualified in 2009 after Pettigrew admitted to doping during the period.
- ^{dq2} The United States team (Jerome Davis, Antonio Pettigrew, Angelo Taylor and Michael Johnson) originally won the 1999 World Championships, but was disqualified in 2009 after Pettigrew admitted to doping during the period.
- ^{dq3} The United States team (Leonard Byrd, Antonio Pettigrew, Derrick Brew and Angelo Taylor) originally won the 2001 World Championships, but was disqualified in 2009 after Pettigrew admitted to doping during the period.
- ^{dq4} The United States team (Calvin Harrison, Tyree Washington, Derrick Brew and Jerome Young) originally won the 2003 World Championships, but was disqualified in 2004 after Harrison and Young were found to have used performance-enhancing drugs.
- ^{dq5} The Russian team (Maksim Dyldin, Lev Mosin, Sergey Petukhov and Vladimir Krasnov) originally finished third in the 2013 World Championships, but was disqualified after Dyldin was found to have used performance-enhancing drugs.

==== Medalists by country ====
Rank	Nation	Gold	Silver	Bronze	Total
1	United States	12	3	0	15
2	Great Britain	2	2	5	9
3	Bahamas	1	2	1	4
4	France	1	1	0	2
4	Trinidad and Tobago	1	1	0	2
6	Poland	1	0	3	4
7	Soviet Union	1	0	0	1
7	Botswana	1	0	0	1
9	Jamaica	0	8	3	11
10	South Africa	0	1	2	3
11	Germany	0	1	1	2
12	Belgium	0	0	2	2
13	Australia	0	0	1	1

=== Women ===
Championships	Gold	Silver	Bronze
1983 Helsinki	East Germany (GDR); Kerstin Walther; Sabine Busch; Marita Koch; Dagmar Rübsam; Undine Bremer*; Ellen Fiedler*	Czechoslovakia (TCH); Taťána Kocembová; Milena Matějkovičová; Zuzana Moravčíková; Jarmila Kratochvílová	Soviet Union (URS); Yelena Korban; Marina Ivanova; Irina Baskakova; Mariya Pinigina
1987 Rome	East Germany (GDR); Dagmar Neubauer; Kirsten Emmelmann; Petra Müller; Sabine Busch; Cornelia Ullrich*	Soviet Union (URS); Aelita Yurchenko; Olga Nazarova; Mariya Pinigina; Olga Bryzgina	United States (USA); Diane Dixon; Denean Howard; Valerie Brisco; Lillie Leatherwood
1991 Tokyo	Soviet Union (URS); Tatyana Ledovskaya; Lyudmyla Dzhyhalova; Olga Nazarova; Olga Bryzgina; Anna Chuprina*	United States (USA); Rochelle Stevens; Diane Dixon; Jearl Miles; Lillie Leatherwood; Natasha Kaiser-Brown*	Germany (GER); Uta Rohländer; Katrin Krabbe; Christine Wachtel; Grit Breuer; Annett Hesselbarth*; Katrin Schreiter*
1993 Stuttgart	United States (USA); Gwen Torrence; Maicel Malone-Wallace; Natasha Kaiser; Jearl Miles; Terri Dendy*; Michelle Collins*	Russia (RUS); Yelena Rouzina; Tatyana Alekseyeva; Margarita Ponomaryova; Irina Privalova; Yelena Golesheva*; Vera Sychugova*	Great Britain (GBR); Linda Keough; Phylis Smith; Tracy Goddard; Sally Gunnell
1995 Gothenburg	United States (USA); Kim Graham; Rochelle Stevens; Camara Jones; Jearl Miles; Nicole Green*	Russia (RUS); Tatyana Chebykina; Svetlana Goncharenko; Yuliya Sotnikova; Yelena Andreyeva; Tatyana Zakharova*	Australia (AUS); Lee Naylor; Renée Poetschka; Melinda Gainsford; Cathy Freeman
1997 Athens	Germany (GER); Anke Feller; Uta Rohländer; Anja Rücker; Grit Breuer	United States (USA); Maicel Malone; Kim Graham; Kim Batten; Jearl Miles Clark; Michelle Collins*; Natasha Kaiser-Brown*	Jamaica (JAM); Inez Turner; Lorraine Graham; Deon Hemmings; Sandie Richards; Nadia Graham-Hutchinson*
1999 Seville	Russia (RUS); Tatyana Chebykina; Svetlana Goncharenko; Olga Kotlyarova; Natalya Nazarova; Natalya Sharova*; Yekaterina Bakhvalova*	United States (USA); Suziann Reid; Maicel Malone-Wallace; Michelle Collins; Jearl Miles Clark; Andrea Anderson*	Germany (GER); Anke Feller; Uta Rohländer; Anja Rücker; Grit Breuer; Anja Knippel*
2001 Edmonton	Jamaica (JAM); Sandie Richards; Catherine Scott-Pomales; Debbie-Ann Parris; Lorraine Fenton; Michelle Burgher*; Deon Hemmings*	Germany (GER); Florence Ekpo-Umoh; Shanta Ghosh; Claudia Marx; Grit Breuer	Russia (RUS); Irina Rosikhina; Yuliya Pechonkina; Anastasiya Kapachinskaya; Olesya Zykina; Natalya Shevtsova*
2003 Saint-Denis	United States (USA); Demetria Washington; Jearl Miles Clark; Me'Lisa Barber; Sanya Richards; DeeDee Trotter*	Russia (RUS); Anastasiya Kapachinskaya; Natalya Nazarova; Olesya Zykina; Yuliya Pechonkina (Nosova); Svetlana Goncharenko*; Svetlana Pospelova*	Jamaica (JAM); Allison Beckford; Lorraine Fenton (Graham); Ronetta Smith; Sandie Richards; Michelle Burgher*
2005 Helsinki	Russia (RUS); Yuliya Pechonkina; Olesya Krasnomovets; Natalya Antyukh; Svetlana Pospelova; Tatyana Firova*; Olesya Zykina*	Jamaica (JAM); Shericka Williams; Novlene Williams; Ronetta Smith; Lorraine Fenton	Great Britain (GBR); Lee McConnell; Donna Fraser; Nicola Sanders; Christine Ohuruogu
2007 Osaka	United States (USA); DeeDee Trotter; Allyson Felix; Mary Wineberg; Sanya Richards; Monique Hennagan*; Natasha Hastings*	Jamaica (JAM); Shericka Williams; Shereefa Lloyd; Davita Prendagast; Novlene Williams; Anastasia Le-Roy*	Great Britain (GBR); Christine Ohuruogu; Marilyn Okoro; Lee McConnell; Nicola Sanders; Donna Fraser*
2009 Berlin^{dq1}	United States (USA); Debbie Dunn; Allyson Felix; Lashinda Demus; Sanya Richards; Natasha Hastings*; Jessica Beard*	Jamaica (JAM); Rosemarie Whyte; Novlene Williams-Mills; Shereefa Lloyd; Shericka Williams; Kaliese Spencer*	Great Britain (GBR); Lee McConnell; Christine Ohuruogu; Vicki Barr; Nicola Sanders; Jenny Meadows*
2011 Daegu^{dq2}	United States (USA); Sanya Richards-Ross; Allyson Felix; Jessica Beard; Francena McCorory; Natasha Hastings*; Keshia Baker*	Jamaica (JAM); Rosemarie Whyte; Davita Prendergast; Novlene Williams-Mills; Shericka Williams; Shereefa Lloyd*; Patricia Hall*	Great Britain (GBR); Perri Shakes-Drayton; Nicola Sanders; Christine Ohuruogu; Lee McConnell
2013 Moscow^{dq3}	United States (USA); Jessica Beard; Natasha Hastings; Ashley Spencer; Francena McCorory; Joanna Atkins*	Great Britain (GBR); Eilidh Child; Shana Cox; Margaret Adeoye; Christine Ohuruogu	France (FRA); Marie Gayot; Lénora Guion-Firmin; Muriel Hurtis-Houairi; Floria Guei; Phara Anacharsis*
2015 Beijing	Jamaica (JAM); Christine Day; Shericka Jackson; Stephenie Ann McPherson; Novlene Williams-Mills; Anastasia Le-Roy*; Chrisann Gordon*	United States (USA); Sanya Richards-Ross; Natasha Hastings; Allyson Felix; Francena McCorory; Phyllis Francis*; Jessica Beard*	Great Britain (GBR); Christine Ohuruogu; Anyika Onuora; Eilidh Child; Seren Bundy-Davies; Kirsten McAslan*
2017 London	United States (USA); Quanera Hayes; Allyson Felix; Shakima Wimbley; Phyllis Francis; Kendall Ellis*; Natasha Hastings*	Great Britain (GBR); Zoey Clark; Laviai Nielsen; Eilidh Doyle; Emily Diamond; Perri Shakes-Drayton*	Poland (POL); Małgorzata Hołub; Iga Baumgart; Aleksandra Gaworska; Justyna Święty; Patrycja Wyciszkiewicz*; Martyna Dąbrowska*
2019 Doha	United States (USA); Phyllis Francis; Sydney McLaughlin; Dalilah Muhammad; Wadeline Jonathas; Jessica Beard*; Allyson Felix*; Kendall Ellis*; Courtney Okolo*	Poland (POL); Iga Baumgart-Witan; Patrycja Wyciszkiewicz; Małgorzata Hołub-Kowalik; Justyna Święty-Ersetic; Anna Kiełbasińska*	Jamaica (JAM); Anastasia Le-Roy; Tiffany James; Stephenie Ann McPherson; Shericka Jackson; Roneisha McGregor*
2022 Eugene	United States (USA); Talitha Diggs; Abby Steiner; Britton Wilson; Sydney McLaughlin; Kaylin Whitney*; Allyson Felix*; Jaide Stepter Baynes*	Jamaica (JAM); Candice McLeod; Janieve Russell; Stephenie Ann McPherson; Charokee Young; Stacey Ann Williams*; Junelle Bromfield*; Tiffany James*	Great Britain (GBR); Victoria Ohuruogu; Nicole Yeargin; Jessie Knight; Laviai Nielsen; Ama Pipi*
2023 Budapest	Netherlands (NED); Eveline Saalberg; Lieke Klaver; Cathelijn Peeters; Femke Bol; Lisanne de Witte*	Jamaica (JAM); Candice McLeod; Janieve Russell; Nickisha Pryce; Stacey-Ann Williams; Charokee Young*; Shiann Salmon*	Great Britain (GBR); Laviai Nielsen; Amber Anning; Ama Pipi; Nicole Yeargin; Yemi Mary John*
2025 Tokyo	United States (USA); Isabella Whittaker; Lynna Irby-Jackson; Aaliyah Butler; Sydney McLaughlin-Levrone; Alexis Holmes*; Rosey Effiong*; Quanera Hayes*; Britton Wilson*	Jamaica (JAM); Dejanea Oakley; Stacey Ann Williams; Andrenette Knight; Nickisha Pryce; Roneisha McGregor*	Netherlands (NED); Eveline Saalberg; Lieke Klaver; Lisanne de Witte; Femke Bol; Myrte van der Schoot*

Note: * Indicates athletes who ran only in the preliminary round and also received medals.

- ^{dq1} The Russian team (Anastasiya Kapachinskaya, Tatyana Firova, Lyudmila Litvinova and Antonina Krivoshapka) originally finished third in the 2009 World Championships, but was disqualified after Kapachinskaya was found to have used performance-enhancing drugs.
- ^{dq2} The Russian team (Antonina Krivoshapka, Natalya Antyukh, Lyudmila Litvinova and Anastasiya Kapachinskaya) originally finished third in the 2011 World Championships, but was disqualified after Kapachinskaya was found to have used performance-enhancing drugs.
- ^{dq3} The Russian team (Yuliya Gushchina, Tatyana Firova, Kseniya Ryzhova and Antonina Krivoshapka) originally won in the 2013 World Championships, but was disqualified after Krivoshapka was found to have used performance-enhancing drugs.

==== Medalists by country ====
Rank	Nation	Gold	Silver	Bronze	Total
1	United States	11	5	1	17
2	Russia	3	3	3	9
3	Jamaica	2	7	2	11
4	East Germany	2	0	0	2
5	Germany	1	1	2	4
6	Soviet Union	1	1	1	3
7	Netherlands	1	0	1	2
8	Great Britain	0	2	8	10
9	Poland	0	1	1	2
10	Czechoslovakia	0	1	0	1
11	Australia	0	0	1	1
11	France	0	0	1	1

== World Indoor Championships medalists ==
=== Men ===
Games	Gold	Silver	Bronze
1991 Seville	Germany; Rico Lieder; Jens Carlowitz; Karsten Just; Thomas Schönlebe	United States; Raymond Pierre; Charles Jenkins Jr. Andrew Valmon; Antonio McKay; Clifton Campbell*; Willie Smith*	Italy; Marco Vaccari; Vito Petrella; Alessandro Aimar; Andrea Nuti
1993 Toronto	United States; Darnell Hall; Brian Irvin; Jason Rouser; Mark Everett	Trinidad and Tobago; Dazel Jules; Alvin Daniel; Neil de Silva; Ian Morris	Japan; Masayoshi Kan; Seiji Inagaki; Yoshihiko Saito; Hiroyuki Hayashi
1995 Barcelona	United States; Rod Tolbert; Calvin Davis; Tod Long; Frankie Atwater	Italy; Fabio Grossi; Andrea Nuti; Roberto Mazzoleni; Ashraf Saber	Japan; Masayoshi Kan; Seiji Inagaki; Tomonari Ono; Hiroyuki Hayashi
1997 Paris	United States; Jason Rouser; Mark Everett; Sean Maye; Deon Minor	Jamaica; Linval Laird; Michael McDonald; Dinsdale Morgan; Greg Haughton; Garth Robinson*	France; Pierre-Marie Hilaire; Rodrigue Nordin; Loic Lerouge; Fred Mango
1999 Maebashi	United States; Andre Morris; Dameon Johnson; Deon Minor; Milton Campbell; Khadevis Robinson*	Poland; Piotr Haczek; Jacek Bocian; Piotr Rysiukiewicz; Robert Maćkowiak	Great Britain and N.I. Allyn Condon; Solomon Wariso; Adrian Patrick; Jamie Baulch; Sean Baldock*
2001 Lisbon	Poland; Piotr Rysiukiewicz; Piotr Haczek; Jacek Bocian; Robert Maćkowiak	Russia; Aleksandr Ladeyshchikov; Ruslan Mashchenko; Boris Gorban; Andrey Semyonov; Dmitry Forshev*	Jamaica; Michael McDonald; Davian Clarke; Michael Blackwood; Danny McFarlane; Greg Haughton*
2003 Birmingham	Jamaica; Leroy Colquhoun; Danny McFarlane; Michael Blackwood; Davian Clarke; Kemel Thompson*	Great Britain and N.I. Jamie Baulch; Timothy Benjamin; Cori Henry; Daniel Caines; Mark Hylton*; Jared Deacon*	Poland; Rafał Wieruszewski; Grzegorz Zajączkowski; Marcin Marciniszyn; Marek Plawgo; Artur Gąsiewski*; Piotr Rysiukiewicz*
2004 Budapest	Jamaica; Greg Haughton; Leroy Colquhoun; Michael McDonald; Davian Clarke; Richard James*; Sanjay Ayre*	Russia; Boris Gorban; Dmitry Forshev; Andrey Rudnitskiy; Aleksandr Usov	Ireland; Robert Daly; Gary Ryan; David Gillick; David McCarthy
2006 Moscow	United States; Tyree Washington; LaShawn Merritt; Milton Campbell; Wallace Spearmon; James Davis*; O.J. Hogans*	Poland; Daniel Dąbrowski; Marcin Marciniszyn; Rafał Wieruszewski; Piotr Klimczak; Paweł Ptak*; Piotr Kędzia*	Russia; Konstantin Svechkar; Aleksandr Derevyagin; Yevgeniy Lebedev; Dmitry Petrov; Andrey Polukeyev*
2008 Valencia	United States; James Davis; Jamaal Torrance; Greg Nixon; Kelly Willie; Joel Stallworth*	Jamaica; Michael Blackwood; Edino Steele; Adrian Findlay; DeWayne Barrett; Aldwyn Sappleton*	Dominican Republic; Arismendy Peguero; Carlos Santa; Pedro Mejía; Yoel Tapia
2010 Doha	United States; Jamaal Torrance; Greg Nixon; Tavaris Tate; Bershawn Jackson; LeJerald Betters*; Kerron Clement*	Belgium; Cédric Van Branteghem; Kevin Borlée; Antoine Gillet; Jonathan Borlée; Nils Duerinck*	Great Britain and N.I. Conrad Williams; Nigel Levine; Chris Clarke; Richard Buck; Luke Lennon-Ford*
2012 Istanbul	United States; Frankie Wright; Calvin Smith Jr. Manteo Mitchell; Gil Roberts; Jamaal Torrance*; Quentin Iglehart-Summers*	Great Britain and N.I. Conrad Williams; Nigel Levine; Michael Bingham; Richard Buck; Luke Lennon-Ford*	Trinidad and Tobago; Lalonde Gordon; Renny Quow; Jereem Richards; Jarrin Solomon
2014 Sopot	United States; Kyle Clemons; David Verburg; Kind Butler III; Calvin Smith Jr. Clayton Parros*; Ricky Babineaux*	Great Britain and N.I. Conrad Williams; Jamie Bowie; Luke Lennon-Ford; Nigel Levine; Michael Bingham*	Jamaica; Errol Nolan; Allodin Fothergill; Akheem Gauntlett; Edino Steele; Dane Hyatt*; Jermaine Brown*
2016 Portland	United States; Kyle Clemons; Calvin Smith Jr. Christopher Giesting; Vernon Norwood; Elvyonn Bailey*; Patrick Feeney*	Bahamas; Michael Mathieu; Alonzo Russell; Shavez Hart; Chris Brown; Ashley Riley*	Trinidad and Tobago; Jarrin Solomon; Lalonde Gordon; Ade Alleyne-Forte; Deon Lendore; Rondel Sorrillo*; Machel Cedenio*
2018 Birmingham	Poland (POL); Karol Zalewski; Rafał Omelko; Łukasz Krawczuk; Jakub Krzewina; Patryk Adamczyk*	United States (USA); Fred Kerley; Michael Cherry; Aldrich Bailey; Vernon Norwood; Marqueze Washington*; Paul Dedewo*	Belgium (BEL); Dylan Borlée; Jonathan Borlée; Jonathan Sacoor; Kevin Borlée
2022 Belgrade	Belgium (BEL); Julien Watrin; Alexander Doom; Jonathan Sacoor; Kevin Borlée; Dylan Borlée*	Spain (ESP); Bruno Hortelano; Iñaki Cañal; Manuel Guijarro; Bernat Erta	Netherlands (NED); Taymir Burnet; Nick Smidt; Terrence Agard; Tony van Diepen; Jochem Dobber*; Isayah Boers*
2024 Glasgow	Belgium (BEL); Jonathan Sacoor; Dylan Borlée; Christian Iguacel; Alexander Doom; Tibo De Smet*	United States (USA); Jacory Patterson; Matthew Boling; Noah Lyles; Christopher Bailey; Paul Dedewo*; Trevor Bassitt*	Netherlands (NED); Liemarvin Bonevacia; Ramsey Angela; Terrence Agard; Tony van Diepen; Taymir Burnet*; Isaya Klein Ikkink*
2025 Nanjing	United States (USA); Elija Godwin; Brian Faust; Jacory Patterson; Christopher Bailey	Jamaica (JAM); Rusheen McDonald; Jasauna Dennis; Kimar Farquharson; Demar Francis	Hungary (HUN); Patrik Simon Enyingi; Zoltán Wahl; Árpád Kovács; Attila Molnár
2026 Toruń	United States (USA); Justin Robinson; Chris Robinson; Demarius Smith; Khaleb McRae; Elija Godwin*; TJ Tomlyanovich*	Belgium (BEL); Jonathan Sacoor; Christian Iguacel; Julien Watrin; Alexander Doom; Robin Vanderbemden*; Dylan Borlée*	Jamaica (JAM); Raheem Hayles; Delano Kennedy; Tyrice Taylor; Kimar Farquharson; Demar Francis*

Note: * Indicates athletes who ran only in the preliminary round and also received medals.

- A USA team of Milton Campbell, Leonard Byrd, Trinity Gray and Jerome Young originally finished second in the 2001 World Indoor Championships, but was disqualified after Young was found to have used performance-enhancing drugs.
- A USA team of James Davis, Jerome Young, Milton Campbell and Tyree Washington originally won in the 2003 World Indoor Championships, but was disqualified after Young was found to have used performance-enhancing drugs.

=== Women ===
Games	Gold	Silver	Bronze
1991 Seville	Germany; Sandra Seuser; Katrin Schreiter; Annett Hesselbarth; Grit Breuer	Soviet Union; Marina Shmonina; Lyudmila Dzhigalova; Margarita Ponomaryova; Aelita Yurchenko	United States; Terri Dendy; Lillie Leatherwood; Jearl Miles; Diane Dixon
1993 Toronto	Jamaica; Deon Hemmings; Beverly Grant; Cathy Rattray-Williams; Sandie Richards	United States; Trevaia Williams; Terri Dendy; Dyan Webber; Natasha Kaiser-Brown	none awarded
1995 Barcelona	Russia; Tatyana Chebykina; Yelena Ruzina; Yekaterina Kulikova; Svetlana Goncharenko	Czech Republic; Naděžda Koštovalová; Helena Dziurová; Hana Benešová; Ludmila Formanová	United States; Nelrae Pasha; Tanya Dooley; Kim Graham; Flirtisha Harris
1997 Paris	Russia; Tatyana Chebykina; Svetlana Goncharenko; Olga Kotlyarova; Tatyana Alekseyeva; Natalya Sharova*; Yekaterina Bakhvalova*	United States; Shanelle Porter; Natasha Kaiser-Brown; Anita Howard; Jearl Miles Clark; Carlette Guidry*	Germany; Anja Rücker; Anke Feller; Heike Meißner; Grit Breuer; Anja Knippel*
1999 Maebashi	Russia; Tatyana Chebykina; Svetlana Goncharenko; Olga Kotlyarova; Natalya Nazarovaa	Australia; Susan Andrews; Tania Van Heer; Tamsyn Lewis; Cathy Freeman	United States; Monique Hennagan; Michelle Collins; Zundra Feagin-Alexander; Shanelle Porter
2001 Lisbon	Russia; Yuliya Nosova; Olesya Zykina; Yuliya Sotnikova; Olga Kotlyarova	Jamaica; Charmaine Howell; Juliet Campbell; Catherine Scott; Sandie Richards	Germany; Claudia Marx; Birgit Rockmeier; Florence Ekpo-Umoh; Shanta Ghosh
2003 Birmingham	Russia; Natalya Antyukh; Yuliya Pechonkina; Olesya Zykina; Natalya Nazarova	Jamaica; Ronetta Smith; Catherine Scott; Sheryl Morgan; Sandie Richards	United States; Monique Hennagan; Meghan Addy; Brenda Taylor; Mary Wineberg
2004 Budapest	Russia; Olesya Forsheva; Olga Kotlyarova; Tatyana Levina; Natalya Nazarova; Olesya Zykina*; Natalya Antyukh*	Belarus; Natallia Solohub; Anna Kozak; Ilona Vusovich; Sviatlana Vusovich	Romania; Angela Moroșanu; Alina Rîpanu; Maria Rus; Ionela Târlea
2006 Moscow	Russia; Tatyana Levina; Natalya Nazarova; Olesya Forsheva; Natalya Antyukh; Yuliya Gushchina*; Tatyana Veshkurova*	United States; Debbie Dunn; Tiffany Williams; Monica Hargrove; Mary Wineberg; Kia Davis*	Belarus; Natallia Solohub; Anna Kozak; Yulyana Yushchanka; Ilona Vusovich
2008 Valencia	Russia; Yuliya Gushchina; Tatyana Levina; Natalya Nazarova; Olesya Zykina	Belarus; Anna Kozak; Iryna Khliustava; Ilona Vusovich; Sviatlana Vusovich	United States; Angel Perkins; Miriam Barnes; Shareese Woods; Moushaumi Robinson
2010 Doha	United States; Debbie Dunn; DeeDee Trotter; Natasha Hastings; Allyson Felix	Czech Republic; Denisa Rosolová; Jitka Bartoničková; Zuzana Bergrová; Zuzana Hejnová	Great Britain and N.I. Kim Wall; Vivki Barr; Perri Shakes-Drayton; Lee McConnell
2012 Istanbul	Great Britain and N.I. Shana Cox; Nicola Sanders; Christine Ohuruogu; Perri Shakes-Drayton	United States; Leslie Cole; Natasha Hastings; Jernail Hayes; Sanya Richards-Ross	Romania; Angela Moroșanu; Angela Panainte; Adelina Pastor; Elena Mirela Lavric
2014 Sopot	United States; Natasha Hastings; Joanna Atkins; Francena McCorory; Cassandra Tate; Jernail Hayes*; Monica Hargrove*	Jamaica; Patricia Hall; Anneisha McLaughlin; Kaliese Spencer; Stephenie Ann McPherson; Verone Chambers*; Natoya Goule*	Great Britain and N.I. Eilidh Child; Shana Cox; Margaret Adeoye; Christine Ohuruogu; Victoria Ohuruogu*
2016 Portland	United States; Natasha Hastings; Quanera Hayes; Courtney Okolo; Ashley Spencer	Poland; Ewelina Ptak; Małgorzata Hołub; Magdalena Gorzkowska; Justyna Święty	Romania; Adelina Pastor; Mirela Lavric; Andrea Miklós; Bianca Răzor
2018 Birmingham	United States (USA); Quanera Hayes; Georganne Moline; Shakima Wimbley; Courtney Okolo; Joanna Atkins*; Raevyn Rogers*	Poland (POL); Justyna Święty-Ersetic; Patrycja Wyciszkiewicz; Aleksandra Gaworska; Małgorzata Hołub-Kowalik; Joanna Linkiewicz*; Natalia Kaczmarek*	Great Britain (GBR); Meghan Beesley; Hannah Williams; Amy Allcock; Zoey Clark; Anyika Onuora*
2022 Belgrade	Jamaica (JAM); Junelle Bromfield; Janieve Russell; Roneisha McGregor; Stephenie Ann McPherson; Tiffany James*	Netherlands (NED); Lieke Klaver; Eveline Saalberg; Lisanne de Witte; Femke Bol; Andrea Bouma*	Poland (POL); Natalia Kaczmarek; Iga Baumgart-Witan; Kinga Gacka; Justyna Święty-Ersetic; Aleksandra Gaworska*
2024 Glasgow	Netherlands (NED); Lieke Klaver; Cathelijn Peeters; Lisanne de Witte; Femke Bol; Myrte van der Schoot*; Eveline Saalberg*	United States (USA); Quanera Hayes; Talitha Diggs; Bailey Lear; Alexis Holmes; Jessica Wright*; Na'Asha Robinson*	Great Britain (GBR); Laviai Nielsen; Lina Nielsen; Ama Pipi; Jessie Knight; Hannah Kelly*
2025 Nanjing	United States (USA); Quanera Hayes; Bailey Lear; Rosey Effiong; Alexis Holmes	Poland (POL); Justyna Święty-Ersetic; Aleksandra Formella; Anastazja Kuś; Anna Gryc	Australia (AUS); Ellie Beer; Ella Connolly; Bella Pasquali; Jemma Pollard
2026 Toruń	United States (USA); Bailey Lear; Rosey Effiong; Paris Peoples; Shamier Little; Abbey Glynn*; Brianna White*	Netherlands (NED); Lieke Klaver; Myrte van der Schoot; Nina Franke; Eveline Saalberg; Madelief van Leur*; Elisabeth Paulina*	Spain (SPA); Paula Sevilla; Ana Prieto; Rocío Arroyo; Blanca Hervás; Carmen Avilés*; Daniela Fra*

Note: * Indicates athletes who ran only in the preliminary round and also received medals.

- A Russian team of Svetlana Pospelova, Natalya Nazarova, Kseniya Vdovina and Tatyana Firova originally finished second in the 2010 World Indoor Championships, but was disqualified after Firova was found to have used performance-enhancing drugs.
- A Jamaican team of Bobby-Gaye Wilkins, Clora Williams, Davita Prendergast and Novlene Williams-Mills originally finished third in the 2010 World Indoor Championships, but was disqualified after Wilkins was found to have used performance-enhancing drugs.
- A Russian team of Yuliya Gushchina, Kseniya Ustalova, Marina Karnaushchenko and Aleksandra Fedoriva originally finished third in the 2012 World Indoor Championships, but was disqualified in 2019 after Gushchina was found to have used performance-enhancing drugs.

== Notable splits ==
=== Men ===
- Herb McKenley (Jamaica) ran a 44.6 split in the 1952 Helsinki Olympic final.
- Ron Freeman (USA) ran a 43.2 split in the 1968 Mexico Olympic final.
- Julius Sang (Kenya) ran a 43.6 split in the 1972 Munich Olympic final.
- Alberto Juantorena (Cuba) ran a 43.7 split in the 1977 IAAF World Cup event as part of the Americas team.
- Quincy Watts ran a 43.1 split and Steve Lewis (USA) ran a 43.4 split in the 1992 Barcelona Olympic final.
- Butch Reynolds ran a 43.23 split and Michael Johnson (both USA) ran a 42.91 split in the 1993 Stuttgart World Championship final; the USA team's final time of 2:54.29 is the current world record.
- Mark Richardson (GBR) ran a 43.57 split and Davian Clarke (JAM) ran a 43.51 split in the 1997 Athens World Championship final.
- Jeremy Wariner (USA) ran a 43.10 split in the 2007 Osaka World Championship final.
- Jeremy Wariner (USA) ran a 43.18 split in the 2008 Beijing Olympic final.
- Michael Norman (USA) ran a 43.06 split in the 2018 NCAA West Preliminaries final.
- Matthew Hudson-Smith (GBR) ran a 43.00 split, Letsile Tebogo (BOT) ran a 43.04 split, and Rai Benjamin (USA) ran a 43.13 in the 2024 Paris Olympics final.

=== Women ===
- Jarmila Kratochvílová (CZE) ran a 47.6 split in the 1982 Athens European Championship final, a 47.75 split in the 1983 Helsinki World Championship final, and a 47.9 split in the 1983 Europa Cup in London.
- Marita Koch (GDR) ran a 47.70 split in Erfurt 1984, a 47.9 split in the 1982 European Championship final, and a 47.9 split at the 1985 Canberra World Cup.
- Allyson Felix (USA) ran a 47.72 split in the 2015 Beijing World Championships final, a 48.01 split in the 2007 Osaka World Championships final, and a 48.20 split in the 2012 London Olympic final.
- Olga Nazarova and Olga Bryzgina (USSR) both ran a 47.80 split in the 1988 Seoul Olympics final; the Soviet team's final time of 3:15.17 is the current world record.
- Sydney McLaughlin (USA) ran a 47.70 split in the 2024 Paris Olympics, and a 47.91 split at the 2022 World Championships in Eugene.
- Femke Bol (NED) ran a 47.93 split in the 2024 Paris Olympics mixed 4 × 400 final.
- Florence Griffith Joyner (USA) ran a 48.08 split in the 1988 Seoul Olympic final.
