= 1992 World Junior Championships in Athletics – Men's 4 × 400 metres relay =

The men's 4x400 metres relay event at the 1992 World Junior Championships in Athletics was held in Seoul, South Korea, at Olympic Stadium on 19 and 20 September.

== Medalists ==
Gold	William Porter; Milton Mallard; Regan Nichols; Deon Minor; United States
Silver	Greg Haughton; Edward Clarke; Davian Clarke; Carl McPherson; Jamaica
Bronze	Hiroyuki Hayashi; Tadashi Nishihata; Tomonari Ono; Takayuki Sudo; Japan

== Results ==
=== Final ===
20 September

Rank	Nation	Competitors	Time	Notes
1st place, gold medalist(s)	United States	William Porter; Milton Mallard; Regan Nichols; Deon Minor	3:06.11	
2nd place, silver medalist(s)	Jamaica	Greg Haughton; Edward Clarke; Davian Clarke; Carl McPherson	3:06.58	
3rd place, bronze medalist(s)	Japan	Hiroyuki Hayashi; Tadashi Nishihata; Tomonari Ono; Takayuki Sudo	3:06.66	
4	Poland	Piotr Rysiukiewicz; Artur Gąsiewski; Przemysław Sznurkowski; Tomasz Czubak	3:07.01	
5	United Kingdom	Iwan Thomas; Guy Bullock; Allyn Condon; Carl Southam	3:07.48	
6	Germany	Marko Janke; Julian Voelkel; Alexander Müller; Marcus Rau	3:07.98	
7	Australia	Steven Kingston; Heath Fitzpatrick; Mark Moresi; Declan Stack	3:08.01	
8	Italy	Michele D'Angelo; Raffaele Mangialardi; Davide Cadoni; Ashraf Saber	3:11.33	

=== Heats ===
19 September

==== Heat 1 ====
Rank	Nation	Competitors	Time	Notes
1	Japan	Hiroyuki Hayashi; Tadashi Nishihata; Tomonari Ono; Takayuki Sudo	3:07.27	Q
2	United Kingdom	Iwan Thomas; Adrian Patrick; Guy Bullock; Carl Southam	3:07.46	Q
3	Poland	Piotr Rysiukiewicz; Artur Gąsiewski; Przemysław Sznurkowski; Tomasz Czubak	3:07.96	q
4	Germany	Marko Janke; Julian Voelkel; Alexander Müller; Marcus Rau	3:10.13	q
5	Italy	Michele D'Angelo; Stefano Tagliaferri; Raffaele Mangialardi; Ashraf Saber	3:10.57	q
6	New Zealand	Nick Cowan; Michael Calver; Mark Keddell; Shaun Farrell	3:11.09	
7	Brazil	Sérgio Ribeiro; Alexandre de Oliveira; Sanderlei Parrela; Ronaldo dos Anjos	3:16.35	

==== Heat 2 ====
Rank	Nation	Competitors	Time	Notes
1	United States	William Porter; Milton Mallard; Regan Nichols; Deon Minor	3:06.77	Q
2	Australia	Steven Kingston; Heath Fitzpatrick; Mark Moresi; Declan Stack	3:07.63	Q
3	Jamaica	Davian Clarke; Edward Clarke; Ian Weakley; Carl McPherson	3:09.26	q
4	Canada	Eric Frempong-Manso; Mark Graham; Sasha Smiljanic; Marlon Dechausey	3:10.72	
5	South Korea	Lee Jung-Ho; Lee Un-Hak; Jo Jae-Son; Lee Jin-Il	3:11.57	
6	Kenya	Hezron Maina; Vincent Malakwen; Benson Koech; Sammy Biwott	3:12.73	
7	Mexico	Arturo Castillon; Salvador Chamor; Eduardo Fernández; Alejandro Cárdenas	3:19.47	
	Nigeria	Emmanuel Okoli; Kenneth Enyiazu; Jude Monye; Udeme Ekpeyong	DQ	IAAF rule 141.2

== Participation ==
According to an unofficial count, 63 athletes from 15 countries participated in the event.

- Australia (4)
- Brazil (4)
- Canada (4)
- Germany (4)
- Italy (5)
- Jamaica (5)
- Japan (4)
- Kenya (4)
- Mexico (4)
- New Zealand (4)
- Nigeria (4)
- Poland (4)
- South Korea (4)
- United Kingdom (5)
- United States (4)
