= Jamal Rhoden-Stevens =

British Athlete (born 1994)

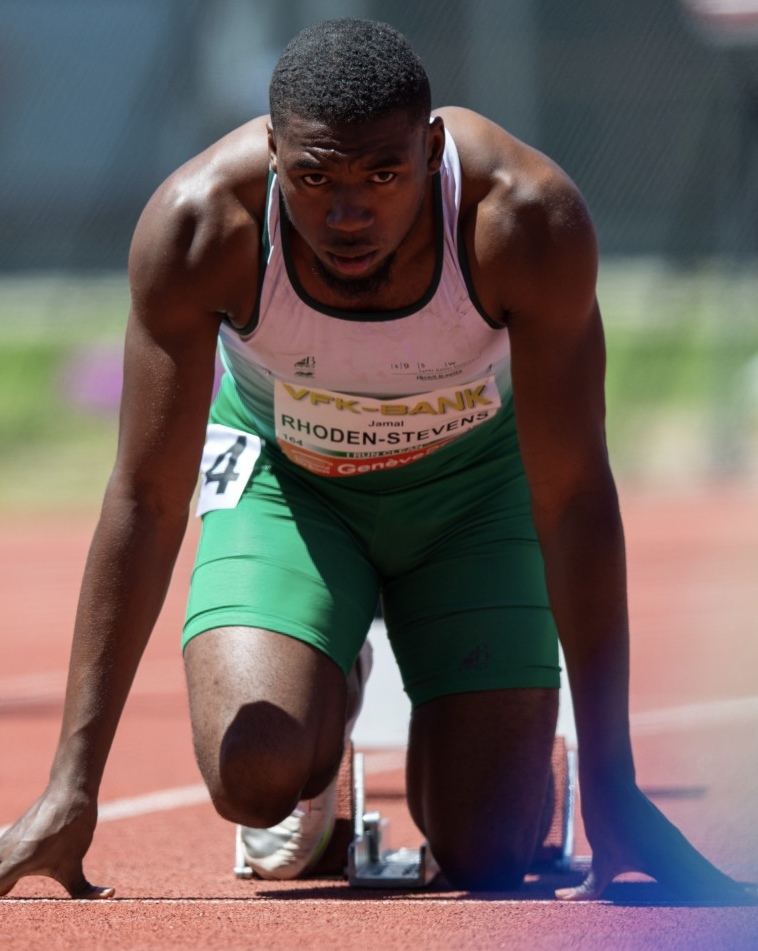

Personal information
- Nationality: British
- Born: 27 April 1994 (age 32) Great Britain
- Occupation: Professional athlete

Sport
- Sport: Athletics
- Events: 100m, 200m, 400m
- Club: Shaftesbury Barnet Harriers
Medal record
Athletics
Representing England
World Indoor Athletics Championships
4 × 400 m relay
European Athletics Championships
4 × 400 m relay, 200 m, 400 m

Jamal Rhoden Stevens (born 27 April 1994, in Great Britain) is a male British sprinter.

== Athletics career ==
In 2018, at Birmingham IAAF World Indoor Championships, Jamal Rhoden Stevens competed in the 4 × 400 m relay. He represented England and competed in the Commonwealth Games, the England Athletics Senior and Disability Championship in the 400 m on 2022, times with 45.95. He was invited to the 2023 United Kingdom Athletics indoor Championship for 400 m race along with other athletes.

He participated in the 4 × 400 m relay with the British team in 2019, IAAF World Relays held in Yokohama.

== Match 4 ==
Year	Competition	Venue	Position	Event	Notes
Representing Great Britain and England
2021	National athletics league	StoneX Stadium, London		100 m relay	10.55
2021	National athletics league	StoneX Stadium, London		200 m relay	20.90

== 4 × 400 Metres Relay Men – Final ==
IAAF World Indoor Championships

Place	Team	Result	Reaction	Lane
6th	Great Britain & N.I	3:05.08	Jamal Rhoden Stevens	3
6th	Great Britain & N.I	3:05.08	Owen Smith	3
6th	Great Britain & N.I	3:05.08	Grant Plenderleith	3
6th	Great Britain & N.I	3:05.08	Lee Thompson	3
