= 1992 World Junior Championships in Athletics – Men's 400 metres hurdles =

The men's 400 metres hurdles event at the 1992 World Junior Championships in Athletics was held in Seoul, South Korea, at Olympic Stadium on 16, 17 and 18 September.

== Medalists ==
| Gold | Ashraf Saber; Italy |
| Silver | Sammy Biwott; Kenya |
| Bronze | William Porter; United States |

== Results ==
=== Final ===
18 September

| Rank | Name | Nationality | Time | Notes |
|---|---|---|---|---|
| 1st place, gold medalist(s) | Ashraf Saber | Italy | 50.02 | |
| 2nd place, silver medalist(s) | Sammy Biwott | Kenya | 50.75 | |
| 3rd place, bronze medalist(s) | William Porter | United States | 51.37 | |
| 4 | Wessel Dippenaar | South Africa | 51.50 | |
| 5 | Steffen Kolb | Germany | 51.73 | |
| 6 | Kehinde Aladefa | Nigeria | 51.85 | |
| 7 | Alejandro Argudin | Cuba | 52.05 | |
| 8 | Gary Brown | Australia | 53.45 | |

=== Semifinals ===
17 September

==== Semifinal 1 ====
| Rank | Name | Nationality | Time | Notes |
|---|---|---|---|---|
| 1 | Ashraf Saber | Italy | 50.42 | Q |
| 2 | Sammy Biwott | Kenya | 50.62 | Q |
| 3 | Alejandro Argudin | Cuba | 51.25 | Q |
| 4 | Wessel Dippenaar | South Africa | 51.63 | Q |
| 5 | Regan Nichols | United States | 51.84 | |
| 6 | Kostas Pochanis | Cyprus | 51.85 | |
| 7 | Carlos Silva | Portugal | 52.57 | |
| 8 | Seiji Inagaki | Japan | 53.15 | |

==== Semifinal 2 ====
| Rank | Name | Nationality | Time | Notes |
|---|---|---|---|---|
| 1 | William Porter | United States | 51.27 | Q |
| 2 | Kehinde Aladefa | Nigeria | 52.08 | Q |
| 3 | Steffen Kolb | Germany | 52.08 | Q |
| 4 | Gary Brown | Australia | 52.25 | Q |
| 5 | Chiu Wensheng | Chinese Taipei | 52.51 | |
| 6 | Kenko Matsue | Japan | 52.77 | |
| 7 | Albert Ramírez | Cuba | 53.63 | |
| 8 | Victor Mendoza | Peru | 54.42 | |

=== Heats ===
16 September

==== Heat 1 ====
| Rank | Name | Nationality | Time | Notes |
|---|---|---|---|---|
| 1 | Steffen Kolb | Germany | 51.82 | Q |
| 2 | Albert Ramírez | Cuba | 52.15 | Q |
| 3 | Regan Nichols | United States | 52.30 | q |
| 4 | Gary Brown | Australia | 52.88 | q |
| 5 | Abdurrahim Nayeem | Bangladesh | 53.77 | |
| 6 | Ian Weakley | Jamaica | 57.50 | |

==== Heat 2 ====
| Rank | Name | Nationality | Time | Notes |
|---|---|---|---|---|
| 1 | Ashraf Saber | Italy | 52.10 | Q |
| 2 | Victor Mendoza | Peru | 52.77 | Q |
| 3 | Arturo Castillon | Mexico | 52.97 | |
| 4 | Petteri Pulkkinen | Finland | 53.25 | |
| 5 | Shawn Browne | Barbados | 55.09 | |
| | Everson Teixeira | Brazil | DNF | |

==== Heat 3 ====
| Rank | Name | Nationality | Time | Notes |
|---|---|---|---|---|
| 1 | Sammy Biwott | Kenya | 51.39 | Q |
| 2 | Kostas Pochanis | Cyprus | 52.17 | Q |
| 3 | Wessel Dippenaar | South Africa | 52.45 | q |
| 4 | Daniel Blochwitz | Germany | 53.05 | |
| 5 | Jean-Sébastien Dauch | France | 53.33 | |
| 6 | Rok Kop | Slovenia | 55.93 | |
| 7 | Chris Carroll | Australia | 56.39 | |

==== Heat 4 ====
| Rank | Name | Nationality | Time | Notes |
|---|---|---|---|---|
| 1 | William Porter | United States | 51.75 | Q |
| 2 | Kehinde Aladefa | Nigeria | 51.77 | Q |
| 3 | Alejandro Argudin | Cuba | 52.03 | q |
| 4 | Chiu Wensheng | Chinese Taipei | 52.23 | q |
| 5 | Seiji Inagaki | Japan | 52.50 | q |
| 6 | Salvador Chamor | Mexico | 53.32 | |
| 7 | Sérgio Ribeiro | Brazil | 54.10 | |

==== Heat 5 ====
| Rank | Name | Nationality | Time | Notes |
|---|---|---|---|---|
| 1 | Carlos Silva | Portugal | 52.56 | Q |
| 2 | Kenko Matsue | Japan | 52.73 | Q |
| 3 | Lee Jung-Ho | South Korea | 53.00 | |
| 4 | Mohamed Al-Bishi | Saudi Arabia | 53.17 | |
| 5 | Alexander Ponev | Bulgaria | 53.19 | |
| 6 | Silvio Pelissero | Italy | 53.30 | |

== Participation ==
According to an unofficial count, 32 athletes from 24 countries participated in the event.

- Australia (2)
- Bangladesh (1)
- Barbados (1)
- Brazil (2)
- Bulgaria (1)
- Chinese Taipei (1)
- Cuba (2)
- Cyprus (1)
- Finland (1)
- France (1)
- Germany (2)
- Italy (2)
- Jamaica (1)
- Japan (2)
- Kenya (1)
- Mexico (2)
- Nigeria (1)
- Peru (1)
- Portugal (1)
- Saudi Arabia (1)
- Slovenia (1)
- South Africa (1)
- South Korea (1)
- United States (2)
