= Roberto Mazzoleni =

Italian sprinter

Personal information
- Nationality: Italian
- Born: March 29, 1964 (age 62) Alzano, Italy

Sport
- Country: Italy
- Sport: Athletics
- Event: 400 metres
Medal record
World Indoor Championships
Silver medal – second place	1995 Barcelona	4x400 m relay

Roberto Mazzoleni (born 29 March 1964) is a retired Italian sprinter who specialized in the 400 metres.

== Biography ==
At the 1995 World Indoor Championships he won a silver medal in the 4 x 400 metres relay, together with teammates Fabio Grossi, Andrea Nuti and Ashraf Saber.

Mazzoleni personal best time of 47.23 seconds in the 400 m was achieved in May 1994 in Rome.

== Achievements ==
Year	Competition	Venue	Position	Event	Performance	Notes
1995	World Indoor Championships	(Spain) Barcelona	2nd	4x400 m relay	3:09.12	
