= Sanaria Butler =

American athlete (born 2004)

Personal information
- Born: April 27, 2004 (age 22)

Sport
- Country: United States
- Sport: Athletics
- Event: 400 m

Achievements and titles
- Personal best: 400 m: 49.86 (2026)

Sanaria Butler (born 27 April 2004) is an American sprinter who primarily competes over 400 metres.

== Biography ==
Butler attended Port Neches-Groves High School in Texas, and attended Northwestern University prior to transferring to the University of Arkansas in 2025.

Butler placed fourth in the 400 metres at the 2026 NCAA Indoor Championships in March 2026, running 50.94 seconds, handing ran a personal best 50.70 seconds in the heats. Butler was a member of the winning University of Arkansas 4 x 400 metres relay at the 2025 NCAA Indoor Championships. In April 2026, she ran a personal best time for the 400 metres of 49.86 seconds at the 2026 Mt. Sac Relays.

In the spring of 2026, Butler was part of an Arkansas 4 x 400 team alongside Analisse Batista, Kaylyn Brown and Sanu Jallow that ran 3:22.06, the fifth fastest time in NCAA history. She placed third over 400 metres at the 2026 SEC Championships and won her heat in 50.49 seconds at the NCAA Regionals and qualified for the 2026 NCAA Outdoor Championships. In July, Butler placed seventh in the 400 metres at the 2026 Prefontaine Classic. On 25 July, she placed third over 400 metres at the 2026 USA Outdoor Track and Field Championships in New York.
