= Ilolo Izu =

American sprinter (born 1997)

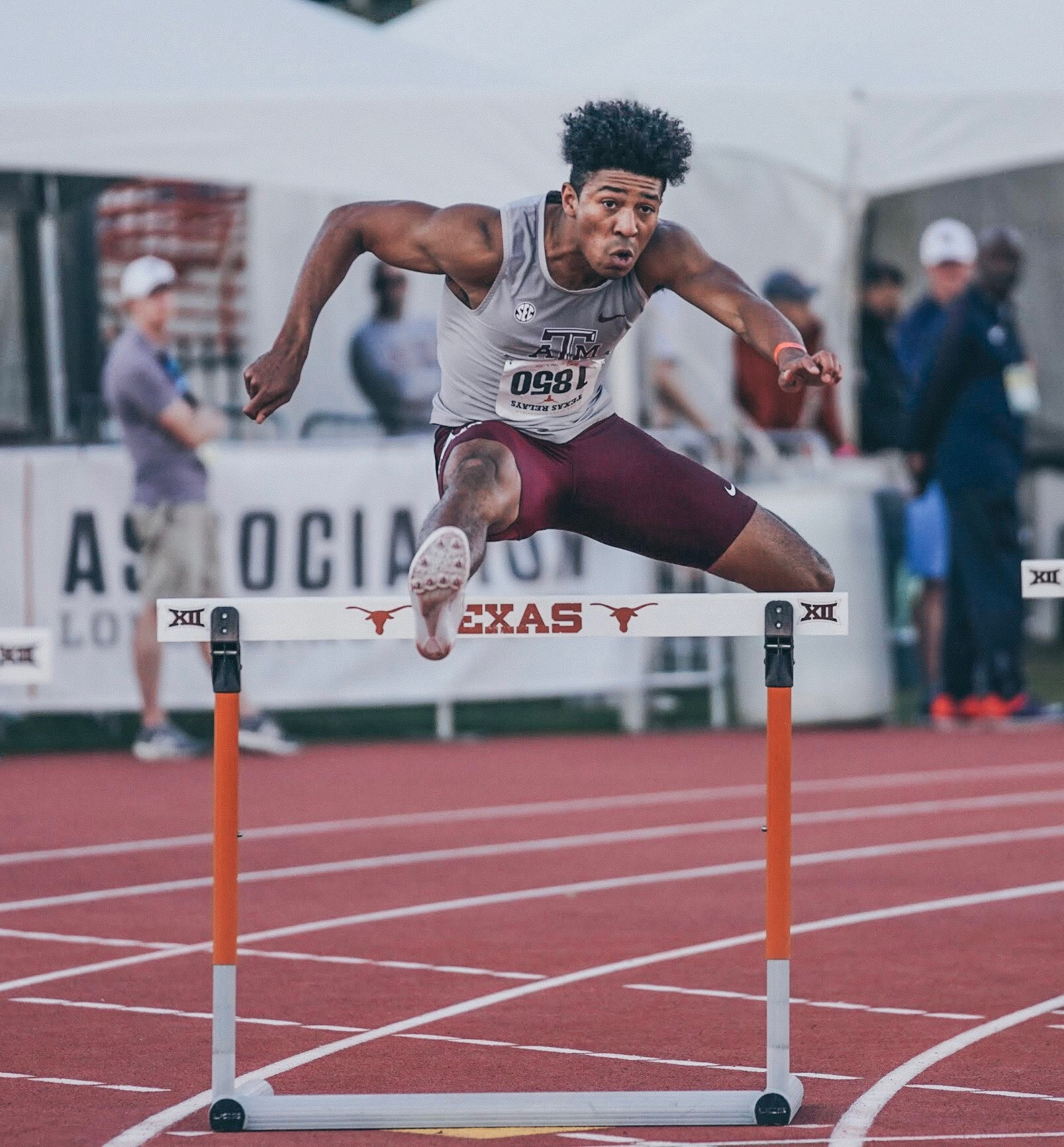
- Ilolo Izu competing at the Texas Relays in 2018

Personal information
- Full name: Justin Ilolo Izu
- Born: May 28, 1997 (age 29) Arlington, Texas, United States
- Height: 6 ft 1 in (1.86 m)
- Weight: 170 lb (77 kg)

Sport
- Country: United States
- Sport: track and field
- Events: 400 m 400 m hurdles

Achievements and titles
- Personal bests: 400 m hs: 49.68 (2019); 400 m indoor: 46.34 (2018)

Ilolo Izu (born May 28, 1997) is an American sprinter, specialized in the 400 metres hurdles and 400 metres.

== Biography ==
Ilolo Izu was born in Arlington, Texas and attended Strake Jesuit College Preparatory for high school, and Texas A&M for college. He competed as a sprinter-hurdler for Texas A&M Aggies from 2015 to 2019, ending a multiple-time NCAA All-American. He was the 2018 and 2019 Texas Relays winner of the 400 m hs. With a time of 3:01.39 on 10 March 2018 he set the world record in the 4 × 400 meters relay indoor by competing for Texas A&M at the 2018 NCAA Division I Indoor Track and Field Championships.

== World records ==
- 4 × 400 metres relay indoor: 3:01.39 ( (United States) College Station, Texas, 10 March 2018 with Robert Grant, Devin Dixon, Mylik Kerley)

== Achievements ==
=== National championship results ===
Representing the Texas A&M Aggies (2015–2019)
Year	Competition	Venue	Position	Event	Time	Notes
2018	NCAA Division I Indoor Championships	College Station, Texas	2nd	4 × 400 m relay	3:01.39	
2018	NCAA Division I Outdoor Championships	Eugene, Oregon	2nd	4 × 400 m relay	2:59.91	
2018	NCAA Division I Outdoor Championships	Eugene, Oregon	11th	400 m hurdles	50.97	
2019	NCAA Division I Indoor Championships	Birmingham, Alabama	2nd	4 × 400 m relay	3:05.15	
