= Robert Grant (athlete) =

Italian sprinter (born 1996)

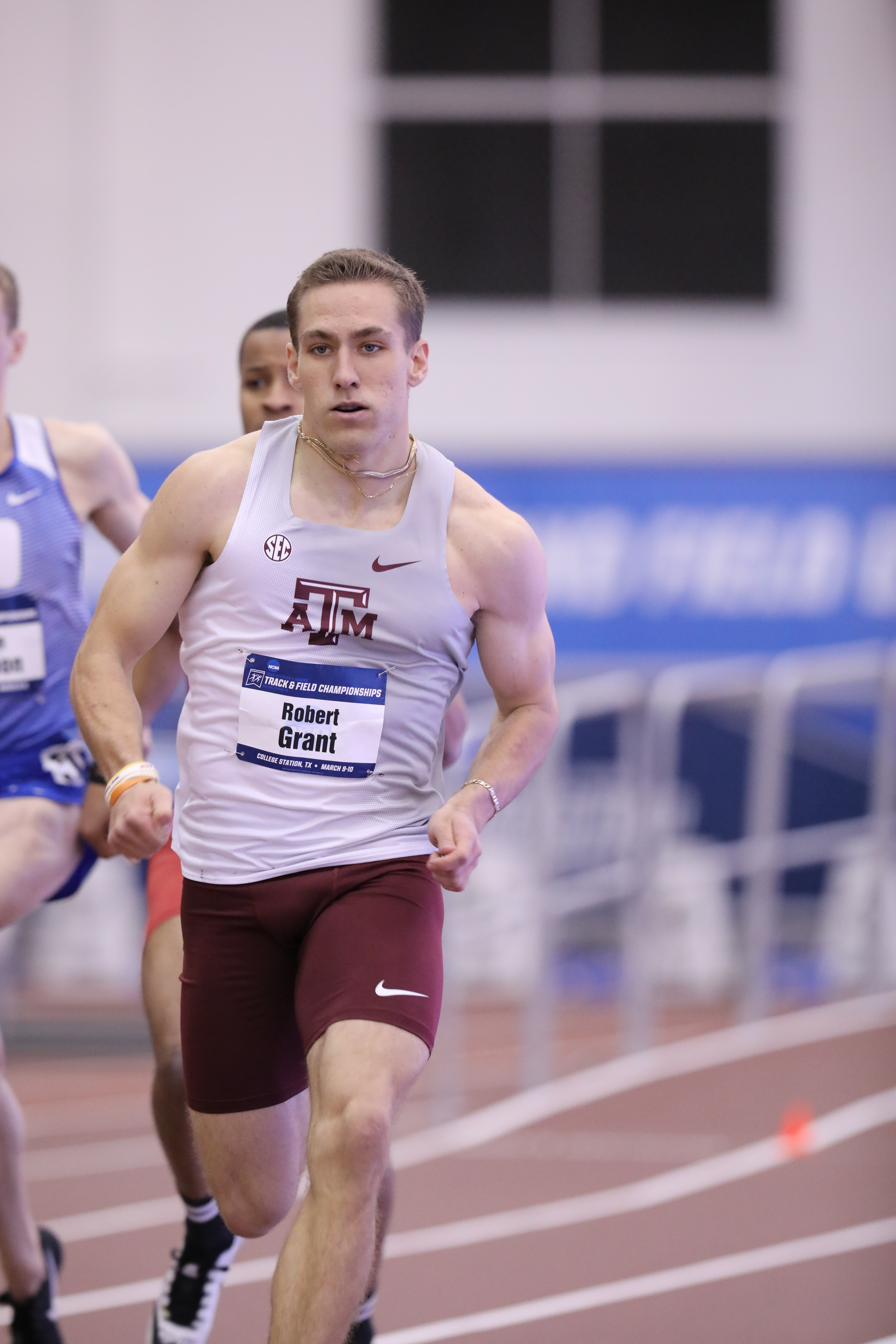
- Robert Grant competing at the European Indoor Championships 2021.

Personal information
- Full name: Robert Charles Grant
- Nickname: Bobby
- National team: Italy (1 cap)
- Born: 31 January 1996 (age 30) Phoenix, Arizona, United States
- Height: 1.77 m (5 ft 10 in)
- Weight: 80 kg (176 lb)

Sport
- Country: Italy
- Sport: Athletics
- Events: 400 m 400 m hs
- Club: Athletic Club 96 Alperia

Achievements and titles
- Personal bests: 400 m hs: 49.15 (2017); 400 m outdoor: 46.09 (2017); 400 m indoor: 45.84 (2018)

Robert Grant (born 31 January 1996) is an American-born Italian sprinter, specialized in the 400 metres hurdles and 400 metres.

== Biography ==
Robert Grant was born in Phoenix, Arizona and attended Brophy College Preparatory. He is a multiple-time NCAA All-American in both the 400 m hurdles and 4 × 400 m relay. His eligibility was for the United States until 20 July 2020 and he was eligible to represent Italy national team from 21 July With a time of 3:01.39 on 10 March 2018 he set the world record in the 4 × 400 meters relay indoor by competing for Texas A&M at the 2018 NCAA Division I Indoor Track and Field Championships.

== World records ==
- 4 × 400 metres relay indoor: 3:01.39 ( (United States) College Station, Texas, 10 March 2018 with Ilolo Izu, Devin Dixon, Mylik Kerleyo)

== Achievements ==
Senior level

Year	Competition	Venue	Position	Event	Time	Notes
Representing Italy
2021	European Indoor Championships	(Poland) Toruń	5th	4 × 400 metres relay	3:07.37	

=== National Championship Results ===
Year	Competition	Venue	Position	Event	Time	Notes
Representing the Texas A&M Aggies (2016–2019)
2016	NCAA Division I Indoor Championships	Birmingham, Alabama	8th	4 × 400 m relay	3:07.49	
2016	NCAA Division I Championships	Eugene, Oregon	4th	400 m hs	49.62	
2016	NCAA Division I Championships	Eugene, Oregon	DNF (semi 1)	4 × 100 m relay	–	
2016	NCAA Division I Championships	Eugene, Oregon	4th	4 × 400 m relay	3:03.94	
2017	NCAA Division I Indoor Championships	College Station, Texas	1st	4 × 400 m relay	3:02.80	
2017	NCAA Division I Outdoor Championships	Eugene, Oregon	1st	4 × 400 m relay	2:59.98	
2018	NCAA Division I Indoor Championships	College Station, Texas	2nd	4 × 400 m relay	3:01.39	
2019	NCAA Division I Outdoor Championships	Austin, Texas	1st	4 × 400 m relay	2:59.05	
