= Tomonari Ono =

Japanese sprinter

Personal information
- Born: February 7, 1974 (age 52)

Sport
- Sport: Track and field
Medal record
Representing Japan
World Indoor Championships
Bronze medal – third place	1995 Barcelona	4x400 m relay
World Junior Championships
Bronze medal – third place	1992 Seoul	4x400 m relay

Tomonari Ono (born February 7, 1974) is a Japanese former sprinter who specialized in the 400 and 800 meters.

He won a bronze medal in the 4x400 m relay at the 1995 World Indoor Championships in Barcelona, along with Hiroyuki Hayashi, Seiji Inagaki, and Masayoshi Kan. He also won a bronze medal in the 1992 World Junior Championships in the 4x400 m relay. Ono holds the Japanese under 20 record in the indoor 800 meters, with a time of 1:49.09. He was the Japanese champion in the 800 meters in 1994 and 1995.
