= Marqueze Washington =

American sprinter

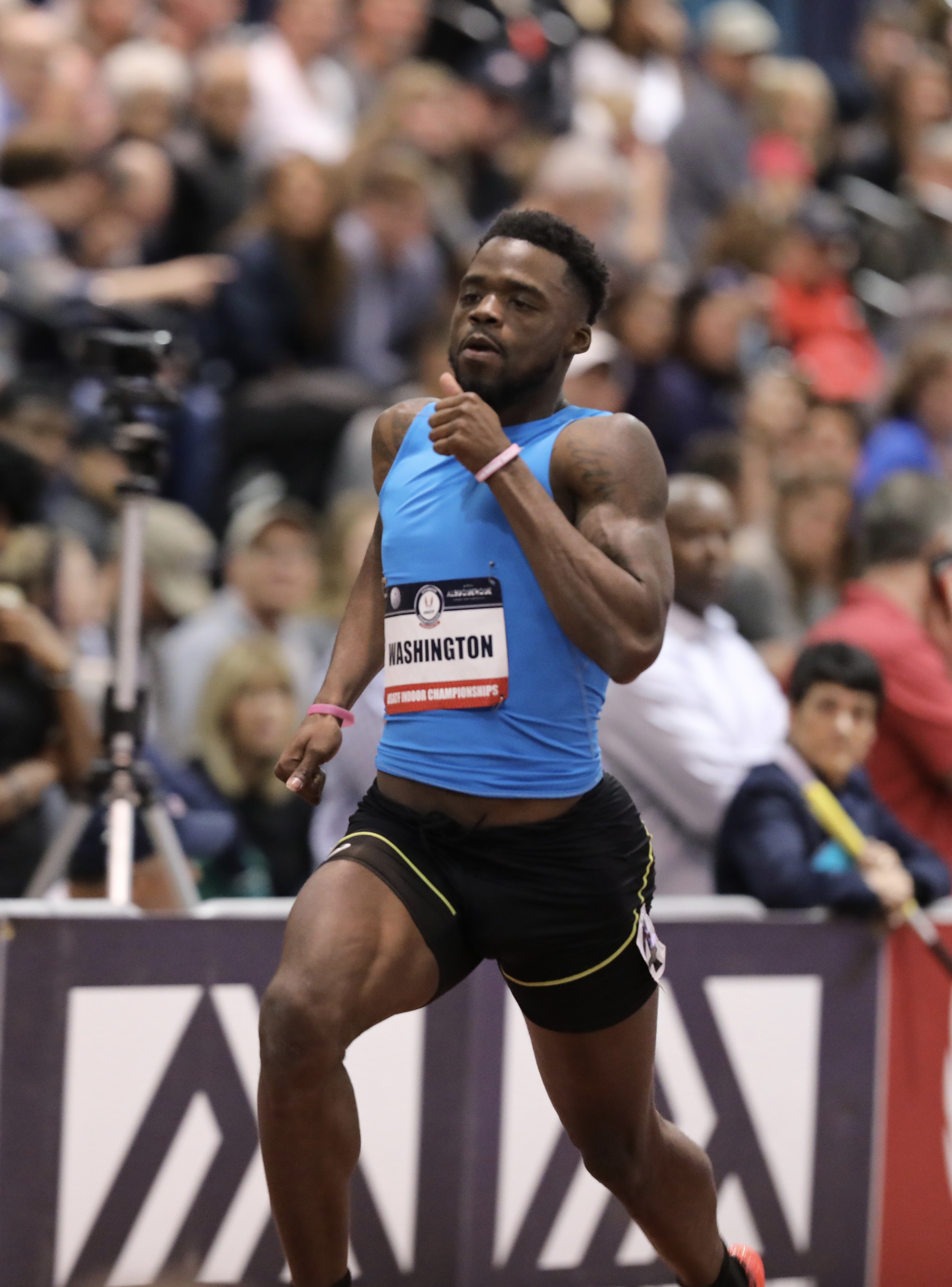
- Washington in 2018

Personal information
- Nationality: American
- Born: September 29, 1993 (age 32)
- Home town: West Monroe, Louisiana
- Education: West Monroe High School

Sport
- Sport: Athletics
- Event: 60 metres – 400 metres
- College team: Arkansas Razorbacks
- Coached by: Travis Geopfert
Medal record
Men's athletics
Representing the United States
World Indoor Championships
Silver medal – second place	2018 Birmingham	4 × 400 m relay

Marqueze Washington (born September 29, 1993) is an American sprinter. He competed collegiately for the University of Arkansas. He won a silver medal in the 4 × 400 m relay at the 2018 IAAF World Indoor Championships, but only competed in the heats.

== Personal bests ==
Outdoor

- 100 m: 10.07 (Mesa, Arizona 2017)
- 200 m: 20.32 (Mesa, Arizona 2017)
- 300 m: 32.76 (Philadelphia 2022)
- 400 m: 45.62 (Fayetteville, Arkansas 2022)

Indoor

- 60 m: 6.60 (Albuquerque 2017)
- 200 m: 20.56 (Fayetteville, Arkansas 2017)
- 300 m: 32.63 (Fayetteville, Arkansas 2016)
- 400 m: 45.24 (Fayetteville, Arkansas 2018)
