= Seiji Inagaki =

Japanese hurdler

Personal information
- Born: 28 April 1973 (age 53)

Sport
- Sport: Track and field
Medal record
Representing Japan
World Indoor Championships
Bronze medal – third place	1993 Toronto	4x400 m relay
Bronze medal – third place	1995 Barcelona	4x400 m relay
Summer Universiade
Silver medal – second place	1993 Buffalo	4x400 m relay

Seiji Inagaki (稲垣誠司, Inagaki Seiji; born 28 April 1973) is a retired Japanese athlete who specialized in the 400 metres hurdles.

He won bronze medals in 4 × 400 metres relay in two editions of the World Indoor Championships; in 1993 with teammates Masayoshi Kan, Yoshihiko Saito and Hiroyuki Hayashi and in 1995 with Kan, Hayashi and Tomonari Ono. He also competed in the same event at the 1997 World Championships without reaching the final.
