= Artur Gąsiewski =

Polish sprinter

Artur Gąsiewski (born 1 November 1973 in Łomża) is a Polish sprinter. At the 2002 European Indoor Championships, he was part of the gold-medalist team in the 4 × 400 m relay. In the 2003 IAAF World Indoor Championships, he was part of the bronze medal-winning team in the 4 × 400 m relay, although he ran only in the heats.
