= 1995 IAAF World Indoor Championships =

5th IAAF World Indoor Championships
- Dates: 10 March–12 March
- Host city: Barcelona, Catalonia, Spain
- Venue: Palau Sant Jordi
- Events: 27
- Participation: 594 athletes from 131 nations

The 5th IAAF World Indoor Championships in Athletics were held at the Palau Sant Jordi in Barcelona, Catalonia, Spain from 10 March to 12 March 1995. Almost 600 athletes from 131 nations participated in 27 events.

== Results ==
=== Men ===
Event	Gold		Silver		Bronze	
60 m	Bruny Surin; Canada	6.46 (CR)	Darren Braithwaite; Great Britain	6.51	Robert Esmie; Canada	6.55
200 m	Geir Moen; Norway	20.58	Troy Douglas; Bermuda	20.94	Sebastián Keitel; Chile	20.98
400 m	Darnell Hall; United States	46.17	Sunday Bada; Nigeria	46.38	Mikhail Vdovin; Russia	46.65
800 m	Clive Terrelonge; Jamaica	1:47.30	Benson Koech; Kenya	1:47.51	Pavel Soukup; Czech Republic	1:47.74
1500 m	Hicham El Guerrouj; Morocco	3:44.54	Mateo Canellas; Spain	3:44.85	Erik Nedeau; United States	3:44.91
3000 m	Gennaro Di Napoli; Italy	7:50.89	Anacleto Jiménez; Spain	7:50.98	Brahim Jabbour; Morocco	7:51.42
60 m hurdles	Allen Johnson; United States	7.39 (CR)	Courtney Hawkins; United States	7.41	Tony Jarrett; Great Britain	7.42
4 × 400 m relay	United States (USA); Rod Tolbert; Calvin Davis; Tod Long; Frankie Atwater	3:07.37	Italy (ITA); Fabio Grossi; Andrea Nuti; Roberto Mazzoleni; Ashraf Saber	3:09.12	Japan (Japan); Masayoshi Kan; Seiji Inagaki; Tomonari Ono; Hiroyuki Hayashi	3:09.73
High jump	Javier Sotomayor; Cuba	2.38	Lambros Papakostas; Greece	2.35 (NR)	Tony Barton; United States	2.32
Pole vault	Sergey Bubka; Ukraine	5.90	Igor Potapovich; Kazakhstan	5.80	Okkert Brits; South Africa and Andrej Tiwontschik; Germany	5.75
Long jump	Iván Pedroso; Cuba	8.51 (CR)	Mattias Sunneborn; Sweden	8.20 (NR)	Erick Walder; United States	8.14
Triple jump	Brian Wellman; Bermuda	17.72 (CR)	Yoelvis Quesada; Cuba	17.62	Serge Hélan; France	17.06
Shot put	Mika Halvari; Finland	20.74	C.J. Hunter; United States	20.58	Dragan Perić; Yugoslavia	20.36
Heptathlon	Christian Plaziat; France	6246	Tomáš Dvořák; Czech Republic	6169	Henrik Dagard; Sweden	6142 (NR)

=== Women ===
Event	Gold		Silver		Bronze	
60 m	Merlene Ottey; Jamaica	6.97	Melanie Paschke; Germany	7.10	Carlette Guidry; United States	7.11
200 m	Melinda Gainsford; Australia	22.64 (AR)	Pauline Davis; Bahamas	22.68 (NR)	Natalya Voronova; Russia	23.01
400 m	Irina Privalova; Russia	50.23 (CR)	Sandie Richards; Jamaica	51.38	Daniela Georgieva; Bulgaria	51.78
800 m	Maria Mutola; Mozambique	1:57.62	Yelena Afanasyeva; Russia	1:59.79	Letitia Vriesde; Suriname	2:00.36
1500 m	Regina Jacobs; United States	4:12.61	Carla Sacramento; Portugal	4:13.02	Maite Zúñiga; Spain	4:16.63
3000 m	Gabriela Szabo; Romania	8:54.50	Lynn Jennings; United States	8:55.23	Joan Nesbit; United States	8:56.08
60 m hurdles	Aliuska López; Cuba	7.92	Olga Shishigina; Kazakhstan	7.92	Brigita Bukovec; Slovenia	7.93
4 × 400 m relay	Russia (RUS); Tatyana Chebykina; Yelena Ruzina; Yekaterina Kulikova; Svetlana Goncharenko	3:29.29	Czech Republic (CZE); Nadia Kostoválová; Helena Dziurová; Hana Benešová; Ludmila Formanová	3:30.27	United States (USA); Nelrae Pasha; Tanya Dooley; Kim Graham; Flirtisha Harris	3:31.43
High jump	Alina Astafei; Germany	2.01	Britta Bilač; Slovenia	1.99	Heike Henkel; Germany	1.99
Long jump	Lyudmila Galkina; Russia	6.95	Irina Mushayilova; Russia	6.90	Susen Tiedtke; Germany	6.90
Triple jump	Yolanda Chen; Russia	15.03 (WR)	Iva Prandzheva; Bulgaria	14.71	Ren Ruiping; China	14.37
Shot put	Kathrin Neimke; Germany	19.40	Connie Price-Smith; United States	19.12	Grit Hammer; Germany	19.02
Pentathlon	Svetlana Moskalets; Russia	4834 (CR)	Kym Carter; United States	4632	Irina Tyukhay; Russia	4622

- Larisa Peleshenko (RUS) originally won the shot put and was awarded the gold medal, but was later disqualified for doping.
- Lyubov Kremlyova (RUS) originally came third in the 1500 metre and was awarded the bronze medal, but was later disqualified for doping.
- Violeta Beclea (ROU) originally came 4th in the 1500 metre, and seemed to be in line of an upgrade to bronze medalist after Kremlyova's disqualification, but she too was disqualified for doping.

== Medal table ==
Rank	Nation	Gold	Silver	Bronze	Total
1	Russia (RUS)	5	2	3	10
2	United States (USA)	4	5	6	15
3	Cuba (CUB)	3	1	0	4
4	Germany (GER)	2	1	4	7
5	Jamaica (JAM)	2	1	0	3
6	Bermuda (BER)	1	1	0	2
6	Italy (ITA)	1	1	0	2
8	Canada (CAN)	1	0	1	2
8	France (FRA)	1	0	1	2
8	Morocco (MAR)	1	0	1	2
11	Australia (AUS)	1	0	0	1
11	Finland (FIN)	1	0	0	1
11	Mozambique (MOZ)	1	0	0	1
11	Norway (NOR)	1	0	0	1
11	Romania (ROM)	1	0	0	1
11	Ukraine (UKR)	1	0	0	1
17	Czech Republic (CZE)	0	2	1	3
17	Spain (ESP)	0	2	1	3
19	Kazakhstan (KAZ)	0	2	0	2
20	Bulgaria (BGR)	0	1	1	2
20	Great Britain (GBR)	0	1	1	2
20	Slovenia (SLO)	0	1	1	2
20	Sweden (SWE)	0	1	1	2
24	Bahamas (BAH)	0	1	0	1
24	Greece	0	1	0	1
24	Kenya (KEN)	0	1	0	1
24	Nigeria (NGA)	0	1	0	1
24	Portugal (POR)	0	1	0	1
29	Chile (CHL)	0	0	1	1
29	China (CHN)	0	0	1	1
29	Japan (JPN)	0	0	1	1
29	South Africa (RSA)	0	0	1	1
29	Suriname (SUR)	0	0	1	1
29	Yugoslavia (FR Yugoslavia)	0	0	1	1
Totals (34 entries)		27	27	28	82

== Participating nations ==
- Albania (1)
- Algeria (2)
- Andorra (1)
- Angola (2)
- Argentina (2)
- Armenia (4)
- Aruba (1)
- Australia (8)
- Austria (8)
- Azerbaijan (3)
- Bahamas (2)
- Bahrain (1)
- Belarus (5)
- Belgium (6)
- Benin (1)
- Bermuda (2)
- Bolivia (2)
- Bosnia and Herzegovina (1)
- Brazil (2)
- Bulgaria (10)
- Burundi (1)
- Cameroon (2)
- Canada (9)
- Central African Republic (1)
- Chad (1)
- Chile (1)
- China (12)
- Chinese Taipei (2)
- Colombia (3)
- Croatia (2)
- Cuba (11)
- Cyprus (3)
- Czech Republic (15)
- Denmark (2)
- Dominica (1)
- Egypt (1)
- Estonia (3)
- Equatorial Guinea (1)
- Ethiopia (1)
- Finland (6)
- France (21)
- French Polynesia (1)
- Gambia (1)
- Georgia (1)
- Germany (31)
- Ghana (1)
- Great Britain (30)
- Greece (14)
- Guatemala (1)
- Haiti (1)
- Honduras (1)
- Hong Kong (1)
- Hungary (4)
- Iceland (2)
- Iran (1)
- Ireland (6)
- Israel (1)
- Italy (18)
- Ivory Coast (2)
- Jamaica (9)
- Japan (6)
- Kazakhstan (9)
- Kenya (2)
- Kyrgyzstan (1)
- Latvia (2)
- Lebanon (1)
- Lithuania (2)
- Madagascar (2)
- Malawi (1)
- Malaysia (1)
- Malta (1)
- Mauritania (1)
- Mauritius (1)
- Mexico (1)
- Moldova (2)
- Mongolia (1)
- Morocco (7)
- Mozambique (2)
- Netherlands (9)
- Netherlands Antilles (1)
- New Zealand (2)
- Nicaragua (1)
- Niger (1)
- Nigeria (2)
- Norway (11)
- Oman (1)
- Pakistan (1)
- Panama (1)
- Papua New Guinea (1)
- Paraguay (1)
- Peru (1)
- Philippines (1)
- Poland (3)
- Portugal (9)
- Puerto Rico (1)
- Qatar (3)
- Republic of the Congo (1)
- Romania (15)
- Russia (34)
- Saint Lucia (1)
- Saint Vincent and the Grenadines (2)
- El Salvador (1)
- San Marino (1)
- Senegal (2)
- Seychelles (2)
- Sierra Leone (2)
- Slovakia (2)
- Slovenia (10)
- South Africa (2)
- South Korea (2)
- Spain (28)
- Sudan (1)
- Suriname (2)
- Sweden (16)
- Switzerland (5)
- Swaziland (1)
- Syria (1)
- Tajikistan (1)
- Togo (2)
- Tunisia (2)
- Turkey (2)
- Turkmenistan (1)
- Uganda (1)
- Ukraine (11)
- United States (52)
- United States Virgin Islands (1)
- Uruguay (1)
- Uzbekistan (2)
- Western Samoa (1)
- Yugoslavia (3)
- Zaire (1)

== See also ==
- 1995 in athletics (track and field)
