= Hiroyuki Hayashi (athlete) =

Japanese sprinter

Hiroyuki Hayashi (林 弘幸, Hayashi Hiroyuki; born 5 September 1973) is a retired Japanese sprinter who specializes in the 400 metres.

He won bronze medals in a 4 × 400 metres relay in two editions of the World Indoor Championships; in 1993 with teammates Masayoshi Kan, Seiji Inagaki and Yoshihiko Saito and in 1995 with Kan, Inagaki and Tomonari Ono. He also competed in the same event at the 1997 World Championships without reaching the final.
