= Tod Long =

American sprinter

Personal information
- Born: December 18, 1970 (age 55) Oklahoma City, Oklahoma, U.S.

Sport
- Sport: Track and field
- Event: Sprints
- College team: Oklahoma Sooners

Achievements and titles
- Personal bests: 6 time NCAA Track and Field All-American
Medal record
Men's Athletics Representing the Oklahoma Sooners
Big Eight Outdoor Championships
Bronze medal – third place	1990 Norman, OK	200 m
Big Eight Outdoor Championships
Gold medal – first place	1991 Omaha, NE	4 × 400 m Relay
Bronze medal – third place	1991 Omaha, NE	4 × 100 m Relay
Big Eight Outdoor Championships
Silver medal – second place	1992 Norman, OK	200 m
Bronze medal – third place	1992 Norman, OK	100 m
Gold medal – first place	1992 Norman, OK	4 × 400 m Relay
Gold medal – first place	1992 Norman, OK	4 × 100 m Relay
NCAA Outdoor Championships
Bronze medal – third place	1992 Austin, TX	4 × 100 m Relay
Big Eight Indoor Championships
Gold medal – first place	1993 Ames, IA	200 m
Silver medal – second place	1993 Ames, IA	400 m
Bronze medal – third place	1993 Ames, IA	4 × 400 m Relay
Big Eight Outdoor Championships
Gold medal – first place	1993 Boulder, CO	400 m
Gold medal – first place	1993 Boulder, CO	4 × 400 m Relay
Gold medal – first place	1993 Boulder, CO	4 × 100 m Relay
Representing the United States
World Indoor Championships
Gold medal – first place	1995 Barcelona, Spain	4 × 400 m relay
USA Indoor Championships
Gold medal – first place	1995 Atlanta, GA	200 m
USA Masters Outdoor Championships
Gold medal – first place	2013 Olathe, KS	100 m
World Masters Outdoor Championships
Gold medal – first place	2013 Porto Alegre, Brazil	100 m
Silver medal – second place	2013 Porto Alegre, Brazil	200 m

Tod Long (born December 18, 1970, in Oklahoma City, Oklahoma) is an American former sprinter.
