= Frankie Atwater =

American sprinter

Personal information
- Born: February 4, 1969 (age 57)
Medal record
Men's Athletics
Representing the United States
World Indoor Championships
Gold medal – first place	1995 Barcelona	4 × 400 m relay

Frankie Atwater (born February 4, 1969) is an American former sprinter. After graduating from Rock Island High School in 1987, Atwater competed for Iowa State University where he won numerous Big 8 titles, NCAA All American and set the NCAA Division I indoor collegiate record at 600 yards. During the summer of 1992, Mr. Atwater competed in the U.S. track and field Olympic Trials in the 400 meter event. Following the trials, Mr. Atwater represented the United States as a member of the U.S. World Cup track and field team that competed in Cuba. In 1995, Frankie Atwater represented the United States as a member of the U.S. World track and field team that won a gold medal at the IAAF World Indoor Championships in Barcelona, Spain.
