= Sanu Jallow-Lockhart =

Gambian athlete (born 2003)

Sanu Jallow
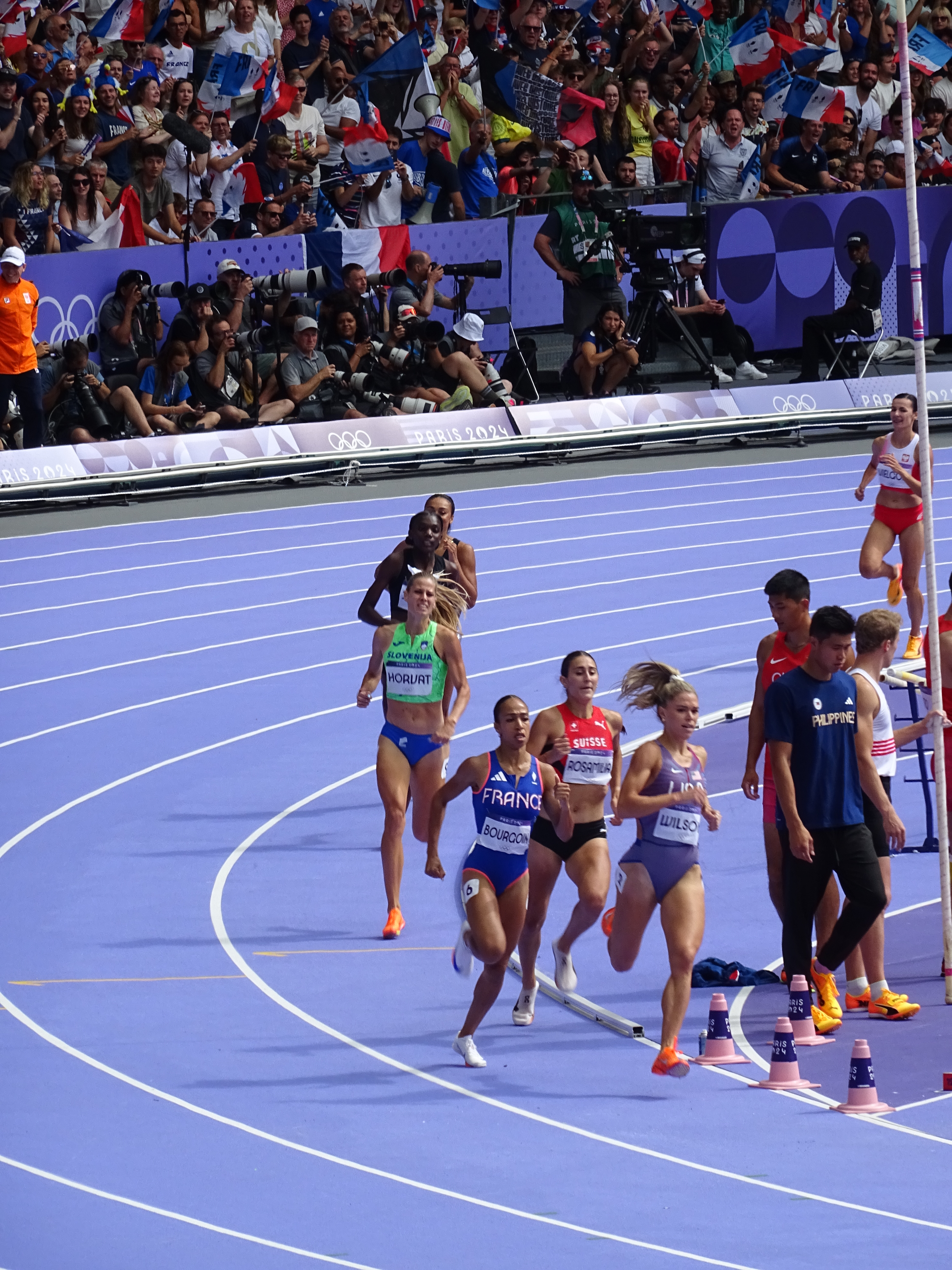
- Competing at the 2024 Olympic Games

Personal information
- Full name: Sanu Jallow-Lockhart
- Nationality: Gambian
- Born: 4 April 2003 (age 23)

Sport
- Sport: Athletics
- Event: Middle-distance running

Achievements and titles
- Personal bests: 400m: 51.21 (2026); 800m: 1:56.85 (2026) NR; 1500m: 4:28.26 (2025); Indoor; 400m: 52.06 (2026) NR; 800m: 1:59.76 (2026) NR; Mile: 4:40.21 (2026) NR

Sanu Jallow-Lockhart (born 4 April 2003) is a middle-distance runner who represented Gambia at the 2024 Olympic Games over 800 metres. She is the Gambian indoor national record holder over 400 metres, 800 metres, and in the mile run.

== Biography ==
Born in The Gambia in West Africa, Jallow moved to the United States at the age of nine years-old as a fluent Fula speaker with little English. She attended Phillip O. Berry Academy of Technology and West Mecklenburg High School in Charlotte, North Carolina and trained at the Charlotte Panthers track club. In 2021, she won the 800 metres at the North Carolina 4A state championship in a meet record time of 2:07.78. In 2022, she won two state titles at the North Carolina 3A state championships at UNC-Greensboro in the 200 metres and 400 metres, and signed for Texas A&M University.

Jallow transferred to the University of Arkansas and in February 2024 ran a personal best of 2:01.77 for the 800 metres. Having later run an 800 metres personal best of 1:59.24 in 2024, Jallow represented The Gambia at the 2024 Olympic Games in Paris, France, over 800 metres.

In February 2025, Jallow set a University of Arkansas indoor record over 800 metres with a time of 1:59.77.

In January 2026, Jallow-Lockhart set an NCAA indoor record for the 600 metres of 1:24.19 running for the University of Arkansas. The following month, Jallow-Lockhart improved her 800 m school record and Gambian national record to 1:59.76. In March, Jallow finished second to Gladys Chepngetich in 2:00.54 at the 2026 NCAA Indoor Championships. That spring, she was part of an Arkansas 4 x 400 team that ran 3:22.06, the fifth fastest time in NCAA history. In May, she became the fourth fastest collegian all-time with 1:58.82 for the 800 m at the SEC Championships, before moving to second on the all-time list behind only Athing Mu, with 1:57.74 to win the NCAA Regionals. Competing in the semi-finals of the 2026 NCAA Outdoor Championships in Eugene, she broke Suzy Favor-Hamilton's 1990 meet record for the 800 metres with a time of 1:58.89. In the final on 13 June, her winning time of 1:56.85 broke Athing Mu's overall NCAA record by close to a second, with runner-up Hayley Kitching also running faster than the previous record. At the championships, she also ran the anchor leg as Arkansas won in 3:18.88, with her split time recorded as 49.02 seconds on the final leg. On 4 July, Jallow placed fourth in the 800 metres in 1:58.12 at the 2026 Prefontaine Classic.

== Personal life ==
With family blessing, Jallow was adopted by her high school track club coach Jann Johnson-Lockhart.
