= Ashraf Saber =

Italian athlete (born 1973)

Personal information
- Nationality: Italian
- Born: 2 April 1973 (age 53) Rome, Italy
- Height: 1.84 m (6 ft 1/2 in)
- Weight: 76 kg (168 lb)

Sport
- Country: Italy
- Sport: Athletics
- Event(s): 400 metres 400 metres hurdles
- Club: G.S. Fiamme Gialle

Achievements and titles
- Personal bests: 400 m: 45.05 (1993); 400 m hs: 49.09 (1993)
Medal record
Event	1st	2nd	3rd
World Indoor Championships	0	1	0
European Indoor Championships	0	1	1
Mediterranean Games	0	0	1
Military World Games	0	0	1
World Junior Championships	1	0	0
European Junior Championships	0	1	0
Total	1	3	3
World Indoor Championships
Silver medal – second place	1995 Barcelona	4x400 metres relay
European Indoor Championships
Silver medal – second place	1998 Valencia	400 metres
Bronze medal – third place	1996 Stockholm	400 metres
Mediterranean Games
Bronze medal – third place	1997 Bari	4x400 metres relay

Ashraf Saber (born 2 April 1973, in Rome) is a former Italian athlete who competed in the 400 metres and 400 metres hurdles, event at which he was world junior champion in 1992.

== Biography ==
He was born to an Egyptian father and a Sicilian mother (although she was born in Egypt). He won seven medals (five at senior level), at the International athletics competitions, five of these with national relays team.

== Achievements ==
Year	Competition	Venue	Position	Event	Notes
Representing Italy
1991	European Junior Championships	Thessaloniki, Greece	2nd	400m hurdles	51.21
1992	World Junior Championships	Seoul, South Korea	1st	400m hurdles	50.02
1992	World Junior Championships	Seoul, South Korea	8th	4×400m relay	3:11.33
1994	European Championships	Helsinki, Finland	29th (h)	400m hurdles	50.87
1994	European Championships	Helsinki, Finland	4th	4x400m relay	3:03.46
1995	World Indoor Championships	Barcelona, Spain	2nd	4x400m relay	3:09.12
1995	Military World Games	Rome, Italy	3rd	4x400m relay	3:05.58
1996	European Indoor Championships	Stockholm, Sweden	3rd	400m	46.86
1997	World Championships	Athens, Greece	8th	4x400 m relay	3:01.52
1997	Mediterranean Games	Bari, Italy	3rd	4x400 m relay	3:03.08
1998	European Indoor Championships	Valencia, Spain	2nd	400m	45.99 NR
1998	World Cup	Johannesburg, South Africa	5th	400m	46.54

== National titles ==
Ashraf Saber has won 5 times the individual national championship.

- 1 win in the 400 metres (2000)
- 4 wins in the 400 metres indoor (1995, 1996, 1998, 2002)

== See also ==
- Italian all-time lists - 400 metres
- Italian all-time lists - 400 metres hurdles
- Italy national relay team
