= 2016 IAAF World Indoor Championships – Men's 400 metres =

Men's 400 metres at the 2016 IAAF World Indoor Championships

Men's 400 metres at the 2016 IAAF World Indoor Championships
- Venue: Oregon Convention Center
- Dates: March 18 (heats and semifinals); March 19 (final)
- Competitors: 28 from 22 nations
- Winning time: 45.44

Medalists
gold medal	Pavel Maslák	Czech Republic
silver medal	Abdalelah Haroun	Qatar
bronze medal	Deon Lendore	Trinidad and Tobago

Video on YouTube Official Video

The men's 400 metres at the 2016 IAAF World Indoor Championships took place on March 18 and 19, 2016.

All eyes were on Bralon Taplin, who had run the three fastest times of the year, including a win in the semifinals. He led from the break, closely followed by defending champion Pavel Maslák. For 350 metres, Taplin maintained his lead, but Maslák made his move with just 50 metres to go. In a few strides, Taplin was overtaken. Further back, Abdalelah Haroun executed a similar move, overtaking Deon Lendore. Taplin, exhausted, faded quickly. Haroun made a strong push to close the gap on Maslák but fell just short, finishing second. Maslák won with a time of 45.44, while Haroun claimed silver and Lendore took bronze.

== Results ==
=== Heats ===
Qualification: First 2 (Q) and next 2 fastest (q) qualified for the semifinals.

Rank	Heat	Name	Nationality	Time	Notes
1	4	Abdalelah Haroun	Qatar	46.15	Q
2	3	Bralon Taplin	Grenada	46.24	Q
3	1	Deon Lendore	Trinidad and Tobago	46.38	Q
4	1	Boniface Ontuga Mweresa	Kenya	46.44	Q SB
5	5	Pavel Maslák	Czech Republic	46.57	Q
6	1	Kyle Clemons	United States	46.66	q
7	1	Alonzo Russell	Bahamas	46.66	q
8	2	Lalonde Gordon	Trinidad and Tobago	46.72	Q
9	5	Luka Janežič	Slovenia	46.79	Q
10	3	Yavuz Can	Turkey	46.82	Q
11	2	Fitzroy Dunkley	Jamaica	46.83	Q
12	2	Lucas Bua	Spain	46.86	
13	4	Nery Brenes	Costa Rica	46.92	Q SB
14	2	Philip Osei	Canada	47.00	
15	4	Chidi Okezie	Nigeria	47.05	
16	3	Ricardo Chambers	Jamaica	47.07	
17	4	Batuhan Altıntaş	Turkey	47.21	
18	3	Marek Niit	Estonia	47.39	
19	5	Liemarvin Bonevacia	Netherlands	47.48	
20	5	Payton Hazzard	Grenada	47.61	
21	3	Alberth Bravo	Venezuela	47.63	PB
22	3	Emmanuel Dasor	Ghana	47.86	
23	2	Gustavo Cuesta	Dominican Republic	48.46	
24	1	George Erazo	El Salvador	49.66	
25	5	Mowen Boino	Papua New Guinea	49.81	PB
26	4	Kristijan Efremov	Macedonia	50.28	
	4	Vernon Norwood	United States	DQ	R163.3(b)
	5	Michael Mathieu	Bahamas	DQ	R163.3(b)
	1	Sadam Suliman Koumi	Sudan	DNS	
	2	Orukpe Eraiyokan	Nigeria	DNS	

=== Semifinals ===
Qualification: First 3 (Q) qualified directly for the final.

Rank	Heat	Name	Nationality	Time	Notes
1	1	Bralon Taplin	Grenada	45.38	Q
2	2	Pavel Maslák	Czech Republic	45.71	Q
3	2	Abdalelah Haroun	Qatar	45.71	Q, SB
4	2	Lalonde Gordon	Trinidad and Tobago	46.03	Q
5	1	Deon Lendore	Trinidad and Tobago	46.23	Q
6	1	Boniface Ontuga Mweresa	Kenya	46.33	Q, SB
7	1	Nery Brenes	Costa Rica	46.49	SB
8	2	Yavuz Can	Turkey	46.82	
9	1	Kyle Clemons	United States	46.91	
10	2	Alonzo Russell	Bahamas	47.07	
11	2	Fitzroy Dunkley	Jamaica	47.13	
	1	Luka Janežič	Slovenia	DQ	R163.3(b)

=== Final ===
The final was started on March 19, at 19:05.

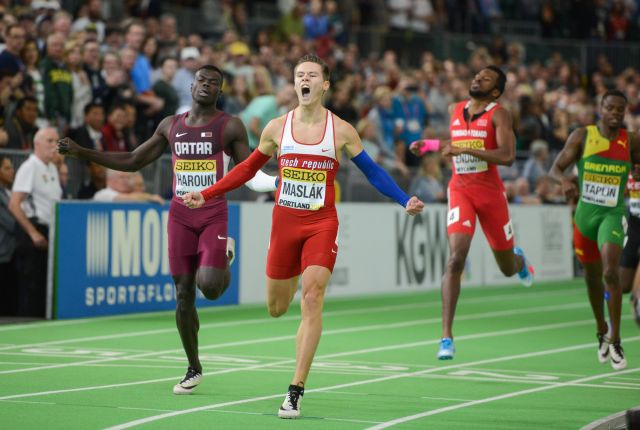
Finish of the race

Rank	Lane	Name	Nationality	Time	Notes
1st place, gold medalist(s)	5	Pavel Maslák	Czech Republic	45.44	
2nd place, silver medalist(s)	3	Abdalelah Haroun	Qatar	45.59	SB
3rd place, bronze medalist(s)	4	Deon Lendore	Trinidad and Tobago	46.17	
4	6	Bralon Taplin	Grenada	46.56	
5	2	Boniface Ontuga Mweresa	Kenya	46.86	
6	1	Lalonde Gordon	Trinidad and Tobago	47.62	
