= Patrick Feeney =

American sprinter (born 1991)

Personal information
- Born: December 21, 1991 (age 34)
- Home town: New Palestine, Indiana, U.S.
- Education: New Palestine High School; University of Notre Dame
- Height: 188 cm (6 ft 2 in)
- Weight: 82 kg (181 lb)

Sport
- Country: United States
- Sport: Sport of athletics
- Event: 400 metres
- College team: Notre Dame Fighting Irish
- Coached by: Alan Turner

Achievements and titles
- National finals: 2013 NCAA Indoors; • 400 m, 4th; 2014 NCAA Indoors; • DMR, 4th; • 400 m, 7th; • 4 × 400 m, 8th; 2015 USA Indoors; • 300 m, 3rd (bronze); 2016 USA Indoors; • 400 m, 4th
- Personal bests: 400 m: 45.51 (2015); 300 m: 32.69 (2015); 200 m: 20.96 (+0.7) (2013)
Medal record
Men's athletics
Representing the United States
World Indoor Championships
Gold medal – first place	2016 Portland	4 × 400 m relay
- Updated on November 2024

Patrick Feeney (born December 29, 1991), also known as Pat Feeney, is an American former sprinter specializing in the 400 metres and the 2016 World Athletics Indoor Championships gold medalist in the 4 × 400 m relay by virtue of running in the heats. He was a multiple-time All American for the Notre Dame Fighting Irish and finished 3rd in the 300 m at the 2015 USA Indoor Track and Field Championships.

== Career ==
Feeney played baseball, football, and basketball growing up and started track and field in the 8th grade. He first ran under 48 seconds for 400 m in the 11th grade to finish runner-up at the 2009 Indiana High School Athletic Association championships.

He committed to the Notre Dame Fighting Irish track and field team and qualified for his first NCAA national final to place 4th at the 2013 NCAA Division I Indoor Track and Field Championships. He recorded three All American finishes at the 2014 NCAA indoor championships: 7th in the 400 m, 8th in the 4 × 400 m, and 4th in the distance medley relay.

Feeney maintained a rivalry with Chris Giesting, who he raced at the Indiana high school state meet before they became teammates at Notre Dame. Feeney and Giesting would trade school records and set nine of the top ten 4 × 400 m relay times in school history. They raced each other 32 times, with Feeney winning 14 of those times.

In 2015, Feneey finished 3rd in the 300 m at the USA Indoor Championships, his highest-ever national placing. Outdoors, he anchored the winning U.S. 4 × 400 m team at the Penn Relays and set the KBC Night of Athletics meeting record in the 300 m, running 32.69 seconds.

Feeney achieved his highest international success during the 2016 indoor season, when he placed 4th at the U.S. Indoor Championships and qualified to represent the U.S. along with Giesting at the World Indoor Championships 4 × 400 m in Portland, Oregon. In the first round, Feeney split 46.90 seconds on the anchor leg while Giesting split 45.68 to lead the U.S. team to the fastest qualifying time. For the finals, Feeney and Elvyonn Bailey were replaced by Vernon Norwood and Kyle Clemons, and the United States won the gold medal.

Feeney attempted to qualify to represent the United States at the 2016 Summer Olympics while unsponsored, having to rely on his parents and a GoFundMe fundraiser. At the 2016 United States Olympic trials, Feeney ran 45.96 in the heats to advance past the first round. However, in the semifinals, Feeney placed 8th in his heat with a 46.54 and did not qualify for the Olympic team. Feeney retired after 2016 to focus on medical school.

== Personal life ==
Feeney was born on December 29, 1991, and grew up in New Palestine, Indiana where he attended New Palestine High School. He was exposed to the University of Notre Dame at a young age, attending football games with his family. He has a twin brother, Matt, who he credits with establishing a winning mentality.

After graduation, Feeney stayed in South Bend, Indiana and trained under Notre Dame coach Alan Turner.

Feeney was a science major and delayed medical school to pursue the Olympics. While training, he took biology classes at Indiana University South Bend and volunteered at St. Joseph's Regional Medical Center. He said his ultimate goal is to become an orthopedic surgeon.

== Statistics ==
=== Personal best progression ===
400 m progression
#	Mark	Pl.	Competition	Venue	Date	Ref.
1	47.98	2nd place, silver medalist(s)	IN HS Ch	Bloomington, IN	June 4, 2009	
2	47.88	(gold) (Round B)	Arizona State Invitational	Tempe, AZ	March 25, 2011	
3	47.67	(gold) (Heat 1)	Big East Championships	Villanova, PA	May 6, 2011	
4	47.27	1st place, gold medalist(s)	Big East Championships	Villanova, PA	May 7, 2011	
5	47.04	6th (Semifinal 2)	NCAA East Preliminary Round	Bloomington, IN	May 26, 2011	
6	46.97	1st place, gold medalist(s)	Big East	New York, NY	February 18, 2012	
7	46.57	3rd place, bronze medalist(s)	Big East Outdoor Track & Field Championships	Tampa, FL	May 5, 2012	
8	46.55	(silver) (Heat 4)	NCAA East Preliminary Round	Jacksonville, FL	May 23, 2012	
9	46.27	5th (Qualification 2)	NCAA East Preliminary Round	Jacksonville, FL	May 24, 2012	
10	45.92	(bronze) (Heat 1)	NCAA Division 1 Indoor Championships	Fayetteville, AR	March 7, 2013	
11	45.56	1st place, gold medalist(s)	Stanford Invitational	Stanford, CA	April 3, 2014	
12	45.51	1st place, gold medalist(s)	Meeting Caraibes Région	Baie Mahault, France	May 1, 2015	
