= Trinidad and Tobago at the 2012 Summer Olympics =

- IOC code: TTO (TRI used at these Games)
- NOC: Trinidad and Tobago Olympic Committee
- Website: www.ttoc.org

in London
- Competitors: 30 in 6 sports
- Flag bearers: Marc Burns (opening); George Bovell (closing)
- Medals Ranked 47th: Gold 1 Silver 1 Bronze 2 Total 4

Summer Olympics appearances (overview)
- 1948; 1952; 1956; 1960; 1964; 1968; 1972; 1976; 1980; 1984; 1988; 1992; 1996; 2000; 2004; 2008; 2012; 2016; 2020; 2024

Other related appearances
- British West Indies (1960 S)

Trinidad and Tobago competed at the 2012 Summer Olympics in London, United Kingdom from 27 July to 12 August 2012. This was Trinidad and Tobago's most successful Summer Olympics. It was the nation's largest ever delegation sent to the Olympics, with a total of 30 athletes, 21 men and 9 women, in 6 sports. Trinidad and Tobago's participation in these games marked its sixteenth Olympic appearance as an independent nation, although it had previously competed in four other games (including the 1948 debut in the same host city London) as a British colony, and as part of the West Indies Federation. The nation was awarded four Olympic medals based on the efforts by the athletes who competed in the track and field. Javelin thrower Keshorn Walcott became the first Trinidadian athlete to win an Olympic gold medal since the 1976 Summer Olympics in Montreal, where Hasely Crawford won for the sprint event. Marc Burns, a four-time Olympic athlete and a relay sprinter who led his team by winning the silver medal in Beijing, was the nation's flag bearer at the opening ceremony.

== Overview ==
Trinidad and Tobago's participation in these Olympic games marked its sixteenth appearance as an independent nation since 1964, although it had previously competed in four Olympic games under two different colonies; one as a British colony in 1948, when the nation marked its debut in the same host city for these games, and the other as part of the West Indies Federation, together with Jamaica and Barbados.

Although the athletes from Trinidad and Tobago had competed at every Olympic games since its debut, the nation's delegation to the London Olympics has become the most successful performance at any other Olympic games. It was the largest at any previous Games, with 30 athletes, competing only in 6 sports (athletics, boxing, cycling, sailing, shooting, and swimming). Trinidad and Tobago had also created its historical record by winning the most Olympic medals in the overall standings (4 medals, surpassing the nation's performance at the 1964 Summer Olympics in Tokyo by less than a single medal).

At the London Games, javelin thrower Keshorn Walcott set the nation's historic Olympic record by winning its first ever gold medal since 1976, and the first medal in the field events. Walcott, at age 19, also became Trinidad and Tobago's youngest ever Olympic champion, and the first non-European athlete to win the men's javelin throw since United States' Cy Young at the 1952 Summer Olympics in Helsinki. Furthermore, he was able to break the national record in the javelin throw event, and to surpass Norway's Andreas Thorkildsen, the defending champion and the Olympic record holder, who finished sixth in the final.

Three other medals were awarded in the track events. Sprinter Lalonde Gordon received the bronze medal in the men's 400 metres. He also led the relay team by winning another medal in the men's 4 × 400 metres relay. Richard Thompson, silver medalist in the men's 100 metres at the Beijing games, and Marc Burns, a four-time Olympic athlete, on the other hand, led their team this time to settle for the silver medal in the men's 4 × 100 metres relay.

Apart from the track and field, Trinidad and Tobago also excelled in cycling and swimming. Njisane Phillip qualified for the men's sprint and Keirin events in track cycling, but narrowly missed the bronze medal to Australia's Shane Perkins, finishing only in fourth place. Meanwhile, swimmer and former Olympic bronze medalist George Bovell had competed in the freestyle and backstroke events, particularly in the men's 50 m freestyle. After his dismal performance in Beijing, Bovell performed tremendously in these Olympic games by finishing first in the overall heats, and fifth in the semi-finals, allowing him to take the qualifying spot for the finals. In the end, he finished abruptly in seventh place.

== Medalists ==
Medal	Name	Sport	Event	Date
Gold	Keshorn Walcott	Athletics	Men's javelin throw	11 August
Silver^{*}	Keston Bledman; Marc Burns; Emmanuel Callender; Richard Thompson	Athletics	Men's 4 × 100 m relay	11 August
Bronze	Lalonde Gordon	Athletics	Men's 400 m	6 August
Bronze	Lalonde Gordon; Jarrin Solomon; Ade Alleyne-Forte; Deon Lendore	Athletics	Men's 4 × 400 m relay	10 August

^{*} In May 2014, the US 4 × 100 metres relay team member Tyson Gay received a one-year suspension for anabolic steroid use and was stripped of his medals after 15 July 2012 when he first used. In May 2015, the IOC wrote to US Olympic Committee telling them to collect the medals from teammates Trell Kimmons, Justin Gatlin, Ryan Bailey, Jeffery Demps and Darvis Patton. Two of Gay's teammates who ran with him in the final, Kimmons and Bailey, had previously also served suspensions. The medals were reallocated, with Trinidad and Tobago awarded silver, and France taking bronze.

== Athletics ==
Athletes from Trinidad & Tobago have so far achieved qualifying standards in the following athletics events (up to a maximum of 3 athletes in each event at the 'A' Standard, and 1 at the 'B' Standard):

Key

- Note–Ranks given for track events are within the athlete's heat only
- Q = Qualified for the next round
- q = Qualified for the next round as a fastest loser or, in field events, by position without achieving the qualifying target
- NR = National record
- N/A = Round not applicable for the event
- Bye = Athlete not required to compete in round

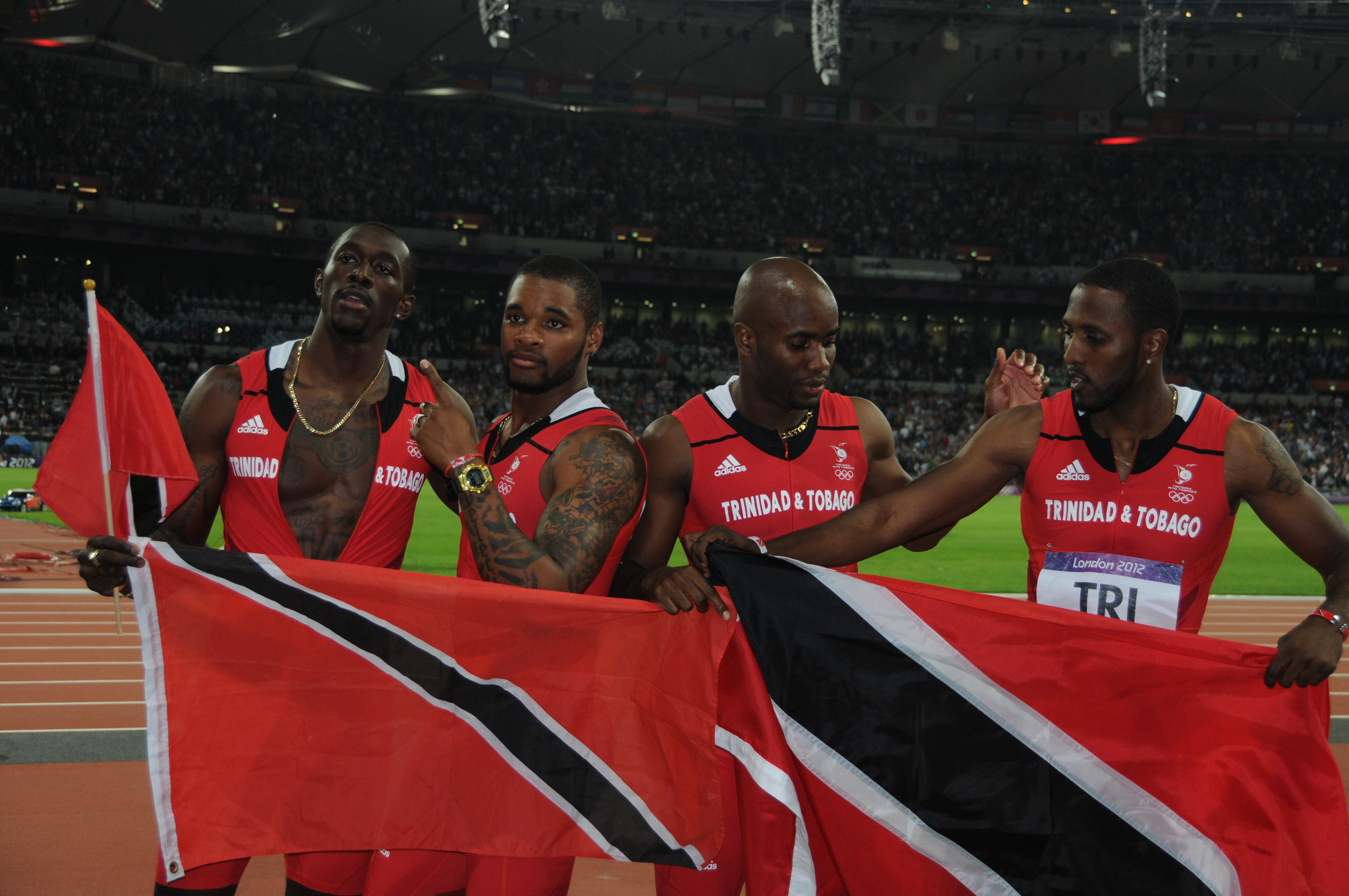
The Trinidad and Tobago 4 × 100 m relay team that won the silver medal

Men
Track & road events

Athlete	Event	Heat		Quarterfinal		Semifinal		Final	
Athlete	Event	Result	Rank	Result	Rank	Result	Rank	Result	Rank
Keston Bledman	100 m	Bye		10.13	3 Q	10.04	4	did not advance	
Wayne Davis	110 m hurdles	13.52	4 q	—		13.49	6	did not advance	
Jehue Gordon	400 m hurdles	49.37	2 Q	—		47.96	2 Q	48.86	6
Lalonde Gordon	400 m	45.43	2 Q	—		44.58	1 Q	44.52	3rd place, bronze medalist(s)
Deon Lendore	400 m	45.81	5	—		did not advance			
Renny Quow	400 m	DNS		—		did not advance			
Rondel Sorrillo	100 m	Bye		10.23	3 Q	10.31	8	did not advance	
Rondel Sorrillo	200 m	20.76	5	—		did not advance			
Mikel Thomas	110 m hurdles	13.74	5	—		did not advance			
Richard Thompson	100 m	Bye		10.14	2 Q	10.02	3 q	9.98	7
Keston Bledman; Marc Burns; Emmanuel Callender; Richard Thompson	4 × 100 m relay	38.10	3 Q	—				38.12	2nd place, silver medalist(s)
Ade Alleyne-Forte; Machel Cedenio; Lalonde Gordon; Deon Lendore; Renny Quow; Jarrin Solomon	4 × 400 m relay	3:00.38	1 Q	—				2:59.40 NR	3rd place, bronze medalist(s)

* Jamol James was selected in the men's 4 × 100 m relay, but did not compete.

Field events

Athlete	Event	Qualification		Final	
Athlete	Event	Distance	Position	Distance	Position
Keshorn Walcott	Javelin throw	81.75	10 q	84.58 NR	1st place, gold medalist(s)

Women
Track & road events

Athlete	Event	Heat		Quarterfinal		Semifinal		Final	
Athlete	Event	Result	Rank	Result	Rank	Result	Rank	Result	Rank
Michelle-Lee Ahye	100 m	Bye		11.28	3 Q	11.32	8	did not advance	
Kelly-Ann Baptiste	100 m	Bye		10.96	1 Q	11.00	3 q	10.94	6
Janeil Bellille	400 m hurdles	57.27	7	—		did not advance			
Semoy Hackett	100 m	Bye		11.04	2 Q	11.26	5	did not advance	
Semoy Hackett	200 m	22.81	2 Q	—		22.55	3 q	22.87	8
Kai Selvon	200 m	22.85	4 q	—		23.04	5	did not advance	
Michelle-Lee Ahye; Kelly-Ann Baptiste; Semoy Hackett; Sparkle McKnight; Kai Selvon; Reyare Thomas	4 × 100 m relay	42.31 NR	2 Q	—				DNF	

Field events

Athlete	Event	Qualification		Final	
Athlete	Event	Distance	Position	Distance	Position
Ayanna Alexander	Triple jump	14.09	14	did not advance	
Cleopatra Borel	Shot put	18.36	12	did not advance	

== Boxing ==
Trinidad and Tobago has qualified boxers for the following events.

Men

Athlete	Event	Round of 32	Round of 16	Quarterfinals	Semifinals	Final	
Athlete	Event	Opposition Result	Opposition Result	Opposition Result	Opposition Result	Opposition Result	Rank
Carlos Suárez	Light flyweight	Pehlivan (TUR); L 6–16	did not advance				

== Cycling ==
=== Track ===
Sprint

Athlete	Event	Qualification		Round 1	Repechage 1	Round 2	Repechage 2	Quarterfinals	Semifinals	Final	
Athlete	Event	Time Speed (km/h)	Rank	Opposition Time Speed (km/h)	Opposition Time Speed (km/h)	Opposition Time Speed (km/h)	Opposition Time Speed (km/h)	Opposition Time Speed (km/h)	Opposition Time Speed (km/h)	Opposition Time Speed (km/h)	Rank
Njisane Phillip	Men's sprint	10.202; 70.574	10	Dawkins (NZL); W 10.221; 70.443	Bye	Förstemann (GER); W 10.467; 68.787	Bye	Dmitriev (RUS); W 10.545, W 10.300	Kenny (GBR); L, L	Perkins (AUS); L, L	4

Keirin

Athlete	Event	1st Round	Repechage	2nd Round	Final
Athlete	Event	Rank	Rank	Rank	Rank
Njisane Phillip	Men's keirin	5 R	3 Q	4	7

== Sailing ==
Trinidad and Tobago has qualified 1 boat for each of the following events

Men

Athlete	Event	Race											Net points	Final rank
Athlete	Event	1	2	3	4	5	6	7	8	9	10	M*	Net points	Final rank
Andrew Lewis	Laser	46	43	38	40	29	~~47~~	34	46	14	26	EL	315	37

M = Medal race; EL = Eliminated – did not advance into the medal race;

== Shooting ==
Men

Athlete	Event	Qualification		Final	
Athlete	Event	Points	Rank	Points	Rank
Roger Daniel	10 m air pistol	568	36	did not advance	
Roger Daniel	50 m pistol	539	35	did not advance	

== Swimming ==
Swimmers from Trinidad and Tobago have further achieved qualifying standards in the following events (up to a maximum of 2 swimmers in each event at the Olympic Qualifying Time (OQT), and potentially 1 at the Olympic Selection Time (OST)):

Men

Athlete	Event	Heat		Semifinal		Final	
Athlete	Event	Time	Rank	Time	Rank	Time	Rank
George Bovell	50 m freestyle	21.77	1 Q	21.77	5 Q	21.82	7
George Bovell	100 m freestyle	DNS		did not advance			
George Bovell	100 m backstroke	55.22	29	did not advance			

== See also ==
- Trinidad and Tobago at the 2012 Summer Paralympics
- Trinidad and Tobago at the 2011 Pan American Games
