= Elvyonn Bailey =

American sprinter (born 1991)

Personal information
- Born: 28 September 1991 (age 34)
- Home town: Riverside, California
- Education: Martin Luther King High School; Arkansas Baptist College; Western Kentucky University

Sport
- Country: United States
- Sport: Sport of athletics
- Event: 400 metres
- College team: Arkansas Baptist Buffaloes; Western Kentucky Hilltoppers

Achievements and titles
- National finals: 2014 NCAAs; • 4 × 100 m, 5th; • 4 × 400 m, 4th; 2016 USA Indoors; • 400 m, 3rd (bronze)
- Personal bests: 400 m: 45.52 (2014); 200 m: 20.64 (+1.4) (2014)
Medal record
Men's athletics
Representing the United States
World Indoor Championships
Gold medal – first place	2016 Portland	4 × 400 m relay
- Updated on November 2024

Elvyonn Bailey (born 28 September 1991) is an American former sprinter specializing in the 400 metres and the 2016 World Athletics Indoor Championships gold medalist in the 4 × 400 m relay by virtue of running in the heats. Before that moment, Bailey was an All American runner for the Western Kentucky Hilltoppers in the relays and finished 3rd in the 400 m at the 2016 USA Indoor Track and Field Championships.

== Career ==
In 2011 and 2012, Bailey ran for the Arkansas Baptist Buffaloes track and field team (at the time part of the NJCAA). He qualified for the junior college national track and field championships seven times, including individually in the 100 m and 200 m.

Bailey transferred to the Western Kentucky Hilltoppers track and field team from 2013 to 2015. After failing to advance from the semifinals of the 4 × 100 m at the 2013 NCAA Division I Outdoor Track and Field Championships, Bailey became a two-time All-American at the 2014 Championships, finishing 5th in the 4 × 100 m and 4th in the 4 × 400 m.

Bailey achieved his greatest success in 2016. Running 46.22 seconds, he placed 2nd in his heat and 3rd overall at the 2016 USA Indoor Track and Field Championships, behind only Vernon Norwood and Kyle Clemons to qualify himself for the 4 × 400 m at the 2016 Portland World Indoor Championships. With Bailey leading off, the U.S. team posted the fastest qualifier going into the finals. In the finals, Bailey and Patrick Feeney were replaced by Clemons and Norwood, and the United States won the gold medal.

== Personal life ==
Bailey was born on 28 September 1991 and grew up in Riverside, California attending Martin Luther King High School, where he played football as a running back. He first attended Arkansas Baptist College before transferring to Western Kentucky University.

== Statistics ==
=== Personal best progression ===
400 m progression
#	Mark	Pl.	Competition	Venue	Date	Ref.
1	47.76	(gold) (Heat 3)	Sun Belt Indoor Track & Field Championships	Jonesboro, AR	24 Feb 2013	
2	47.44	1st place, gold medalist(s)	Sun Belt Indoor Track & Field Championships	Jonesboro, AR	24 Feb 2013	
3	46.66	1st place, gold medalist(s)	Hilltopper Relays	Bowling Green, KY	12 Apr 2013	
4	46.17	(gold) (Heat 1)	Sun Belt Outdoor Track & Field Championships	Miramar, FL	11 May 2013	
5	45.52	(gold) (Heat 2)	Sun Belt Conference Outdoor Track and Field Championships	San Marcos, TX	9 May 2014	
