= Payton Hazzard =

Grenadian sprinter

Personal information
- Born: 6 September 1993 (age 32) New York City, United States
- Education: University of Virginia

Sport
- Sport: Athletics
- Event: 400 m

Payton Derrick Hazzard (born 6 September 1993) is a Grenadian sprinter specialising in the 400 metres. He competed at the 2016 IAAF World Indoor Championships without advancing from the first round.

Although born in the United States, he chose to compete for Grenada, his parents' country of origin.

His personal bests in the event are 45.88 seconds outdoors (Tallahassee 2015) and 46.60 seconds indoors (Boston 2016).

== Competition record ==
Year	Competition	Venue	Position	Event	Notes
Representing Grenada
2014	Commonwealth Games	Glasgow, United Kingdom	29th (h)	400 m	47.33
2016	World Indoor Championships	Portland, United States	20th (h)	400 m	47.61
2016	2016 NGC/SAGICOR/NAAA NATIONAL OPEN CHAMPIONSHIPS	Hasely Crawford Stadium, Trinidad	2nd	4 × 400 m relay	3:10.97
2016	OECS Track & Field Championships	Tortola, British Virgin Islands	2nd	4 × 400 m relay	3:09.74
