= Dane Hyatt =

Jamaican sprinter (born 1984)

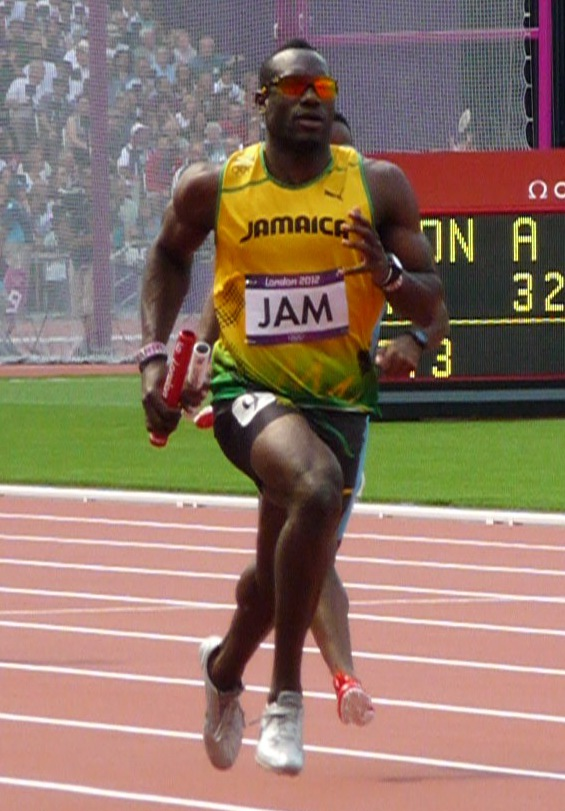

Personal information
- Born: 22 January 1984 (age 42) Falmouth, Jamaica
- Height: 1.83 m (6 ft 0 in)
- Weight: 86 kg (190 lb)

Sport
- Sport: Running
- Events: 200 metres, 400 metres
- College team: Lincoln University, Missouri

Achievements and titles
- Personal bests: 200 m 20.59 (+1.0 m/s) (Norfolk 2012); 400 m 44.83 (Kingston 2012)
Medal record
World Indoor Championships
Bronze medal – third place	2014 Sopot	4×400 m relay
Central American and Caribbean Championships
Silver medal – second place	2009 Havana	400 m

Dane Hyatt (born 22 January 1984) is a Jamaican sprinter, competing in the 200 metres and 400 metres.

In June 2012 Hyatt won the Jamaica Olympic trials 400m in a new personal best of 44.83 to qualify for the Jamaican team for the 2012 Summer Olympics, beating Rusheen McDonald and Jermaine Gonzales. In the 2012 Olympics Dane was eliminated in the semi-final of the 400 metres.

== International competitions ==
Year	Competition	Venue	Position	Event	Notes
Representing Jamaica
2009	Central American and Caribbean Championships	Havana, Cuba	2nd	400 m	45.57
2009	Central American and Caribbean Championships	Havana, Cuba	3rd	4 × 400 m relay	3:04.09
2012	Olympic Games	London, United Kingdom	19th (sf)	400 m	45.59
2012	Olympic Games	London, United Kingdom	–	4 × 400 m relay	DNF
2013	Central American and Caribbean Championships	Morelia, Mexico	5th	4 × 400 m relay	3:03.69
2014	World Indoor Championships	Portland, United States	3rd (h)	4 × 400 m relay	3:06.12
2014	IAAF World Relays	Nassau, Bahamas	8th	4 × 400 m relay	3:10.23
2015	Pan American Games	Toronto, Canada	6th	4 × 400 m relay	3:01.97
2015	World Championships	Beijing, China	3rd (h)	4 × 400 m relay	2:58.69
2016	World Indoor Championships	Portland, United States	4th	4 × 400 m relay	3:06.02
