= Athletics at the 2012 Summer Olympics – Men's 400 metres =

Men's 400 metres at the Games of the XXX Olympiad
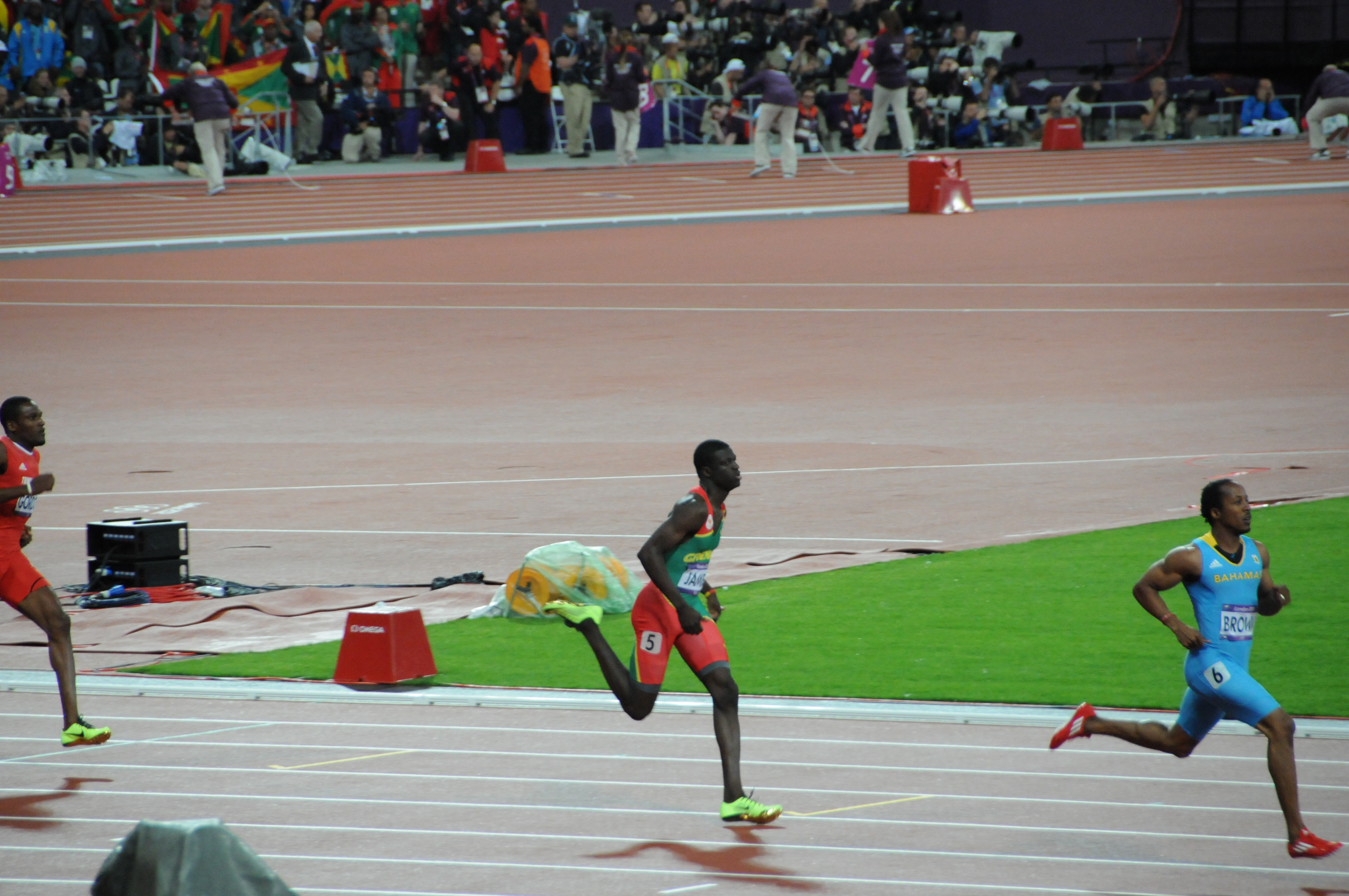
- Venue: Olympic Stadium
- Date: 4–6 August
- Competitors: 49 from 38 nations
- Winning time: 43.94

Medalists
1st place, gold medalist(s)		Kirani James	Grenada
2nd place, silver medalist(s)		Luguelín Santos	Dominican Republic
3rd place, bronze medalist(s)		Lalonde Gordon	Trinidad and Tobago

Official Video

The men's 400 metres competition at the 2012 Summer Olympics in London, United Kingdom, was held at the Olympic Stadium on 4–6 August. Forty-nine athletes from 38 nations competed. The event was won by 0.52 seconds by Kirani James of Grenada, earning the country its first Olympic medal. Luguelín Santos's silver was the Dominican Republic's first medal in the men's 400 metres. Lalonde Gordon's bronze was Trinidad and Tobago's first medal in the event since 1964.

It was only the fourth time that no American was on the podium—following 1908 (where a rules dispute led to disqualification of one of the Americans in the final and the refusal of the other two Americans to run in protest), 1920 (where the top American came in fourth with the same time as the silver and bronze medalists) and 1980 (when the United States boycotted the Games entirely).

It was the first time in any Olympic event that three different Caribbean nations shared the podium.

== Summary ==
The first round went largely to form, but defending champion LaShawn Merritt came to the meet injured and re-injured himself, unable to finish. Renny Quow also failed to start his heat. In the first race, Oscar Pistorius ran a season best to qualify. In the second heat, world champion Kirani James ran easily to win. The third heat featured three national records as Jonathan Borlée took his twin brother's mark for Belgium (Kevin also qualified in the seventh heat), Pavel Maslák set the mark for the Czech Republic and Donald Sanford set the mark for Israel. Most of the time qualifiers came from the hotly contested fourth heat, 45.61, the slowest time qualifier, though Conrad Williams got in with a 46.12 in the slow sixth heat.

It took under 45 seconds to make the final as Lalonde Gordon led the qualifiers from heat 1. Heat 2 featured James and Jonathan Borlée, and double-amputee Pistorius' attempt to make the final. But Pistorius' late charge was non-existent and he finished last in the heat. After the race, in a show of sportsmanship, James and Pistorius exchanged bib numbers, which James proudly showed as he celebrated. In the third heat, shotgun survivor Bryshon Nellum ran 45.02 for the fastest non-qualifier.

Aside from Chris Brown, the finals were filled by athletes under age 24, three of them still teenagers. Demetrius Pinder took the early lead down the back stretch, but reigning World Junior Champion Luguelín Santos (age 18) and reigning World Champion Kirani James (age 19) were in the lead coming off the turn. Down the stretch, James powered ahead for the gold medal. It was also the first Olympic medal for his country. Lalonde Gordon came from behind but could not overtake Santos; he received a bronze. Santos' silver medal was the third medal for the Dominican Republic, coming 45 minutes after Felix Sánchez won his second gold.

== Background ==
This was the 27th appearance of the event, which is one of 12 athletics events to have been held at every Summer Olympics. Five of the finalists from 2008 returned: gold medalist LaShawn Merritt of the United States, fourth-place finisher Chris Brown of the Bahamas, sixth-place finisher Martyn Rooney of Great Britain, seventh-place finisher Renny Quow of Trinidad and Tobago, and eight-place finisher Johan Wissman of Sweden. 2008 gold and 2012 silver medalist Jeremy Wariner failed to make the U.S. team. Despite the Americans' string of 7 straight victories, it was the young Kirani James of Grenada who was favored going into this event. Merritt was the strongest American, but James had beaten him at the 2011 world championships and Merritt came into the 2012 Games injured.

Brunei, Kazakhstan, Latvia, Macedonia, Myanmar, and Palestine appeared in this event for the first time. There was one Independent Olympic Athlete from the former Netherlands Antilles, which had previously competed in 1976. The United States made its 26th appearance, most of any nation, having missed only the boycotted 1980 Games.

== Qualification ==
A National Olympic Committee (NOC) could enter up to 3 qualified athletes in the men's 100 metres event if all athletes met the A standard, or 1 athlete if they met the B standard. The qualifying time standards could be obtained in various meets during the qualifying period that had the approval of the IAAF. Indoor and outdoor meets were eligible. The A standard for the 2012 men's 400 metres was 45.30 seconds; the B standard was 45.90 seconds. The qualifying period for was from 1 May 2011 to 8 July 2012. NOCs could also have an athlete enter the 400 metres through a universality place. NOCs could enter one male athlete in an athletics event, regardless of time, if they had no male athletes meeting the qualifying A or B standards in any men's athletic event.

== Competition format ==
The men's 400 metres competition consisted of 7 heats (Round 1), 3 semifinals and a final. The fastest competitors from each race in the heats qualified for the semifinals along with the fastest overall competitors not already qualified that were required to fill the 24 available spaces in the semifinals. A total of eight competitors qualified for the final from the semifinals.

== Records ==
Prior to the competition, the existing world record, Olympic record, and world leading time were as follows:

World record	Michael Johnson (USA)	43.18	Seville, Spain	26 August 1999
Olympic record	Michael Johnson (USA)	43.49	Atlanta, United States	29 July 1996
World Leading	LaShawn Merritt (USA)	44.12	Eugene, Oregon, United States	24 June 2012

No new world or Olympic records were set during the event.

The following new national records were set during the competition.

Nation	Athlete	Round	Time
Belgium	Jonathan Borlée	Heat 3	44.43
Czech Republic	Pavel Maslák	Heat 3	44.91
Israel	Donald Sanford	Heat 3	45.71
Grenada	Kirani James	Final	43.94

== Schedule ==
All times are British Summer Time (UTC+1)

Date	Time	Round
Saturday, 4 August 2012	10:35	Round 1
Sunday, 5 August 2012	20:40	Semifinals
Monday, 6 August 2012	21:30	Final

== Results ==
Official Video of the First Round

=== Round 1 ===
Qual. rule: first 3 of each heat (Q) plus the 3 fastest times qualified.

==== Heat 1 ====
Rank	Athlete	Nation	Reaction	Time	Notes
1	Luguelín Santos	Dominican Republic	0.187	45.04	Q
2	Oscar Pistorius	South Africa	0.236	45.44	Q, SB
~~3~~	Maksim Dyldin	Russia	0.190	~~45.52~~	Q, DSQ
4	Rusheen McDonald	Jamaica	0.243	46.67	
5	Vitaliy Butrym	Ukraine	0.165	47.62	
—	Ahmed Mohamed Al-Merjabi^{[a]}	Oman	—	DNS	
—	Renny Quow	Trinidad and Tobago	—	DNS	

[a] Ahmed Mohamed Al-Merjabi was forced to scratch from this race after he injured his foot in a training session three days earlier.

==== Heat 2 ====
Rank	Lane	Athlete	Nation	Reaction	Time	Notes
1	6	Kirani James	Grenada	0.173	45.23	Q
2	7	Ramon Miller	Bahamas	0.160	45.57	Q
3	4	Liemarvin Bonevacia	Independent Olympic Athletes	0.232	45.60	Q, PB
4	8	Isaac Makwala	Botswana	0.211	45.67	
5	3	Deon Lendore	Trinidad and Tobago	0.205	45.81	
6	5	Daundre Barnaby	Canada	0.171	46.04	
7	9	Bereket Desta	Ethiopia	0.224	47.40	
8	2	Bahaa Al Farra	Palestine	0.212	49.93	SB

==== Heat 3 ====
Rank	Lane	Athlete	Nation	Reaction	Time	Notes
1	6	Jonathan Borlée	Belgium	0.179	44.43	Q, NR
2	7	Pavel Maslák	Czech Republic	0.186	44.91	Q, NR
3	4	Pavel Trenikhin	Russia	0.194	45.00	Q, PB
4	9	Dane Hyatt	Jamaica	0.261	45.14	q
5	2	Donald Sanford	Israel	0.168	45.71	NR
6	5	Nelson Stone	Papua New Guinea	0.193	46.71	SB
7	8	Sergej Zaikov	Kazakhstan	0.209	47.12	
8	3	Ak Hafiy Tajuddin Rositi	Brunei	0.188	48.67	PB

==== Heat 4 ====
Rank	Lane	Athlete	Nation	Reaction	Time	Notes
1	2	Demetrius Pinder	Bahamas	0.151	44.92	Q
2	7	Bryshon Nellum	United States	0.191	45.29	Q
3	6	Yousef Ahmed Masrahi	Saudi Arabia	0.147	45.43	Q, PB
4	3	Tabarie Henry	Virgin Islands	0.176	45.43	q
5	5	Albert Bravo	Venezuela	0.197	45.61	q, PB
6	4	Jermaine Gonzales	Jamaica	0.171	46.21	
7	8	Kristijan Efremov	Macedonia	0.229	47.92	PB
8	9	Zaw Win Thet	Myanmar	0.181	50.07	

==== Heat 5 ====
Rank	Lane	Athlete	Nation	Reaction	Time	Notes
1	3	Chris Brown	Bahamas	0.171	45.40	Q
2	6	Tony McQuay	United States	0.155	45.48	Q
3	2	Nigel Levine	Great Britain	0.148	45.58	Q
4	7	Yuzo Kanemaru	Japan	0.156	46.01	
5	5	Jānis Leitis	Latvia	0.159	46.41	
6	8	Augusto Stanley	Paraguay	0.190	47.21	

==== Heat 6 ====
Rank	Lane	Athlete	Nation	Reaction	Time	Notes
1	7	Steven Solomon	Australia	0.145	45.18	Q, PB
2	5	Lalonde Gordon	Trinidad and Tobago	0.178	45.43	Q
3	2	Conrad Williams	Great Britain	0.164	46.12	Q
4	8	Marcell Deák-Nagy	Hungary	0.186	46.17	
5	6	Winston George	Guyana	0.245	46.86	
6	4	Sajjad Hashemi	Iran	0.171	47.75	
—	3	LaShawn Merritt	United States	0.195	DNF	(Note: Runner suffered from hamstring injury.)

==== Heat 7 ====
Rank	Lane	Athlete	Nation	Reaction	Time	Notes
1	2	Kevin Borlée	Belgium	0.166	45.14	Q
2	5	Martyn Rooney	Great Britain	0.186	45.36	Q
3	8	Rabah Yousif	Sudan	0.203	45.46	Q
4	7	Nery Brenes	Costa Rica	0.237	45.65	
5	4	Erison Hurtault	Dominica	0.158	46.05	SB
6	3	Marcin Marciniszyn	Poland	0.180	46.35	
—	6	Mathieu Gnanligo	Benin	0.168	DNF	

Official Video of the Semifinal Round

=== Semifinals ===
Qual. rule: first 2 of each heat (Q) plus the 2 fastest times (q) qualified.

==== Semifinal 1 ====
Rank	Lane	Athlete	Nation	Reaction	Time	Notes
1	7	Lalonde Gordon	Trinidad and Tobago	0.168	44.58	Q, PB
2	5	Demetrius Pinder	Bahamas	0.161	44.94	Q
3	6	Steven Solomon	Australia	0.188	44.97	q, PB
4	9	Rabah Yousif	Sudan	0.178	45.13	=PB
5	4	Pavel Maslák	Czech Republic	0.166	45.15	
6	2	Tabarie Henry	Virgin Islands	0.167	45.19	SB
7	8	Pavel Trenikhin	Russia	0.198	45.35	
8	3	Conrad Williams	Great Britain	0.153	45.53	

==== Semifinal 2 ====
Rank	Lane	Athlete	Nation	Reaction	Time	Notes
1	7	Kirani James	Grenada	0.170	44.59	Q, SB
2	6	Chris Brown	Bahamas	0.174	44.67	Q, SB
3	4	Jonathan Borlée	Belgium	0.164	44.99	q
4	9	Tony McQuay	United States	0.230	45.31	
~~5~~	8	Maksim Dyldin	Russia	0.168	~~45.39~~	DSQ
6	3	Nigel Levine	Great Britain	0.146	45.64	
7	2	Albert Bravo	Venezuela	0.185	46.22	
8	5	Oscar Pistorius	South Africa	0.254	46.54	

==== Semifinal 3 ====
Rank	Lane	Athlete	Nation	Reaction	Time	Notes
1	5	Luguelín Santos	Dominican Republic	0.155	44.78	Q
2	4	Kevin Borlée	Belgium	0.147	44.84	Q
3	6	Bryshon Nellum	United States	0.173	45.02	
4	8	Ramon Miller	Bahamas	0.190	45.11	
5	7	Martyn Rooney	Great Britain	0.186	45.31	
6	2	Dane Hyatt	Jamaica	0.159	45.59	
7	9	Yousef Ahmed Masrahi	Saudi Arabia	0.146	45.91	
8	3	Liemarvin Bonevacia	Independent Olympic Athletes	0.153	96.42	

=== Final ===
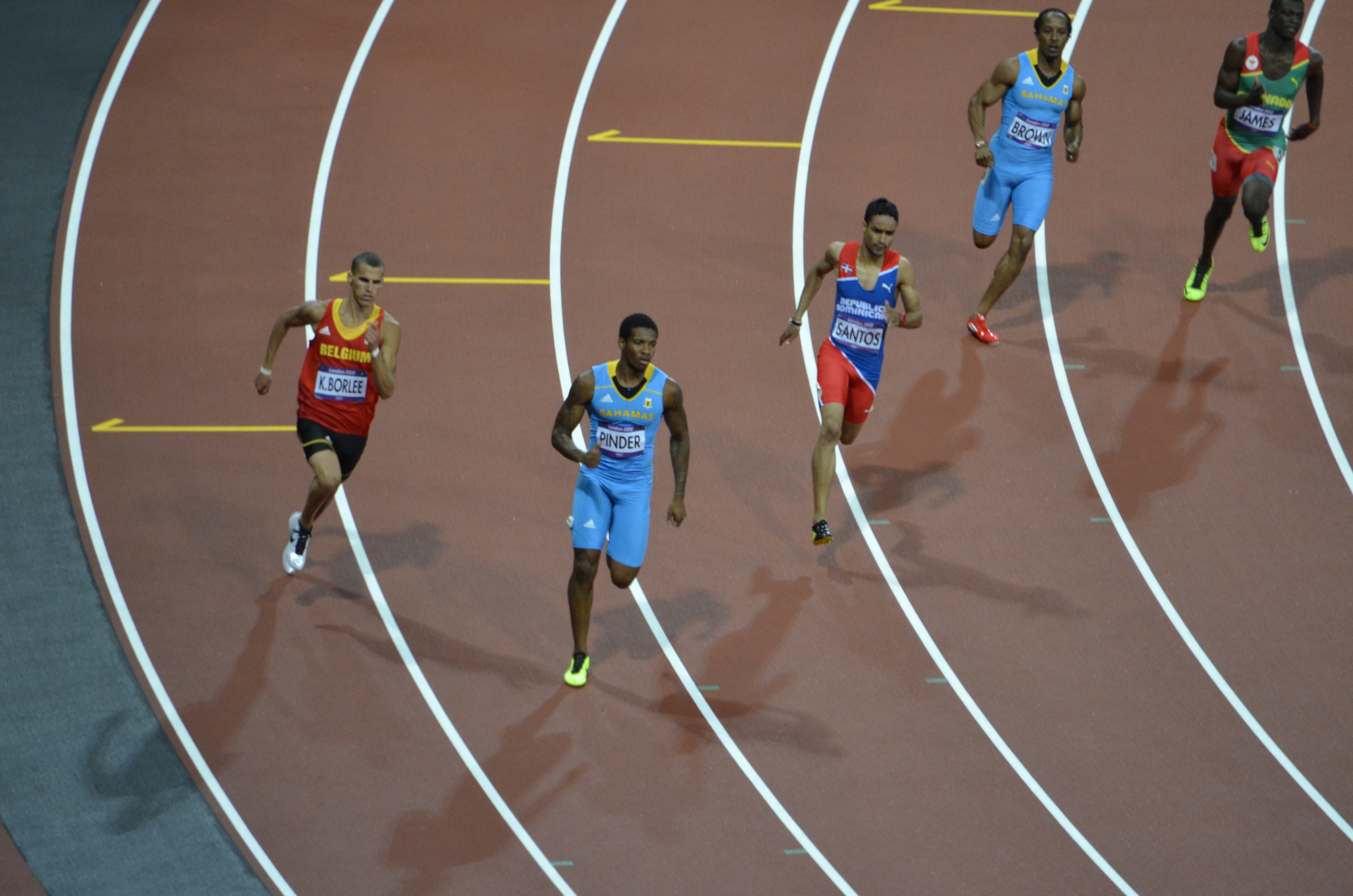
The final turn of the 400 metres final L-R K. Borlée, Pinder, Santos, Brown, James

Rank	Lane	Athlete	Nation	Reaction	Time	Notes
1st place, gold medalist(s)	5	Kirani James	Grenada	0.163	43.94	NR
2nd place, silver medalist(s)	7	Luguelín Santos	Dominican Republic	0.185	44.46	
3rd place, bronze medalist(s)	4	Lalonde Gordon	Trinidad and Tobago	0.159	44.52	PB
4	6	Chris Brown	Bahamas	0.166	44.79	
5	9	Kevin Borlée	Belgium	0.151	44.81	
6	2	Jonathan Borlée	Belgium	0.173	44.83	
7	8	Demetrius Pinder	Bahamas	0.153	44.98	
8	3	Steven Solomon	Australia	0.143	45.14	
