= 2016 USA Indoor Track and Field Championships =

- Dates: March 11–12
- Host city: Portland, Oregon, United States
- Venue: Oregon Convention Center
- Level: Senior
- Type: Indoor
- Events: 30 (men: 15; women: 15)

The 2016 USA Indoor Track and Field Championships was held at the Oregon Convention Center in Portland, Oregon. Organised by USA Track and Field (USATF), the two-day competition took place from March 11 to March 12 and served as the national championships in track and field for the United States. The meet served for the selection of American representatives at the 2016 IAAF World Indoor Championships that was held in the same facility one week later.

The indoor combined track and field events championships were held separately February 26-27 in Crete, Nebraska.

== Medal summary ==
=== Men ===
Event	Gold		Silver		Bronze	
60 meters	Marvin Bracy	6.51 (6.502)	Trayvon Bromell	6.51 (6.507)	Trell Kimmons	6.55
400 meters	Vernon Norwood	45.80 (Ht. 2)	Kyle Clemons	45.95 (Ht. 1)	Elvyonn Bailey	46.22 (Ht. 1)
800 meters	Boris Berian	1:47.19	Erik Sowinski	1:47.62	Casimir Loxsom	1:47.89
1500 meters	Matthew Centrowitz	3:44.33	Robby Andrews	3:44.40	Ben Blankenship	3:45.40
3000 Meters	Ryan Hill	7:38.60	Paul Chelimo	7:39.00	Eric Jenkins	7:41.19
60 m hurdles	Jarret Eaton	7.52	Spencer Adams	7.58	Jeff Porter	7.61
3000 racewalk	John Nunn	11:37.09	Nick Christie	11:56.07	Anthony Peters	11:59.17
High jump	Erik Kynard	2.29 m (7 ft 6 in)	Bryan McBride	2.26 m (7 ft 4 3/4 in)	Deante Kemper	2.26 m (7 ft 4 3/4 in)
Pole Vault	Sam Kendricks	5.90 m (19 ft 4 1/4 in)	Mike Arnold	5.60 m (18 ft 4 1/4 in)	Cale Simmons	5.50 m (18 ft 1/2 in)
Long jump	Marquis Dendy	8.41 m (27 ft 7 in)	Jeffery Henderson	8.05 m (26 ft 4 3/4 in)	Marquise Goodwin	8.05 m (26 ft 4 3/4 in)
Triple jump	Chris Carter	17.06 m (55 ft 11 1/2 in)	Omar Craddock	16.96 m (55 ft 7 1/2 in)	Chris Benard	16.93 m (55 ft 6 1/2 in)
Shot put	Kurt Roberts	20.08 m (65 ft 10 1/2 in)	Reese Hoffa	20.07 m (65 ft 10 in)	Jonathan Jones	19.94 m (65 ft 5 in)
Weight Throw	Colin Dunbar	23.96 m (78 ft 7 1/4 in)	A.G. Kruger	23.24 m (76 ft 2 3/4 in)	Sean Donnelly	23.05 m (75 ft 7 1/4 in)
Heptathlon	Curtis Beach	6075 pts	Japeth Cato	5875 pts	Miller Moss	5712 pts

=== Women ===
Event	Gold		Silver		Bronze	
60 meters	Barbara Pierre	7.00	Tori Bowie	7.15	Tianna Bartoletta	7.17
400 meters	Quanera Hayes	51.09	Ashley Spencer	51.29	Natasha Hastings	51.34
800 meters	Ajee' Wilson	2:00.87	Laura Roesler	2:02.44	Phoebe Wright	2:02.51
1500 meters	Brenda Martinez	4:08.37	Cory McGee	4:09.97	Amanda Eccleston	4:10.42
3000 Meters	Shannon Rowbury	8:55.65	Abbey D'Agostino	8:57.31	Shalaya Kipp	8:59.85
60m hurdles	Brianna Rollins	7.76	Kendra Harrison	7.77	Queen Harrison	7.83
3000 racewalk	Maria Michta-Coffey	12:33.75	Miranda Melville	12:47.39	Erin Gray	13:00.03
High jump	Vashti Cunningham	1.99 m (6 ft 6 1/4 in) WJR	Elizabeth Patterson	1.93 m (6 ft 3 3/4 in)	Chaunte Lowe	1.93 m (6 ft 3 3/4 in)
Pole vault	Sandi Morris	4.95 m (16 ft 2 3/4 in)	Jenn Suhr	4.90 m (16 ft 3/4 in)	Kristen Hixson	4.65 m (15 ft 3 in)
Long jump	Brittney Reese	6.89 m (22 ft 7 1/4 in)	Janay DeLoach	6.64 m (21 ft 9 1/4 in)	Andrea Geubelle	6.57 m (21 ft 6 1/2 in)
Triple jump	Christina Epps	14.05 m (46 ft 1 in)	Tori Franklin	13.66 m (44 ft 9 3/4 in)	Imani Oliver	13.59 m (44 ft 7 in)
Shot put	Michelle Carter	19.49 m (63 ft 11 1/4 in)	Jill Camarena-Williams	18.64 m (61 ft 1 3/4 in)	Jeneva Stevens	18.56 m (60 ft 10 1/2 in)
Weight Throw	Gwen Berry	24.35 m (79 ft 10 1/2 in)	Amber Campbell	24.19 m (79 ft 4 1/4 in)	Felisha Johnson	23.53 m (77 ft 2 1/4 in)
Pentathlon	Barbara Nwaba	4415 pts	Kaylon Eppinger	4285 pts	Chari Hawkins	4225 pts
