= Christopher Giesting =

American track and field sprinter (born 1992)

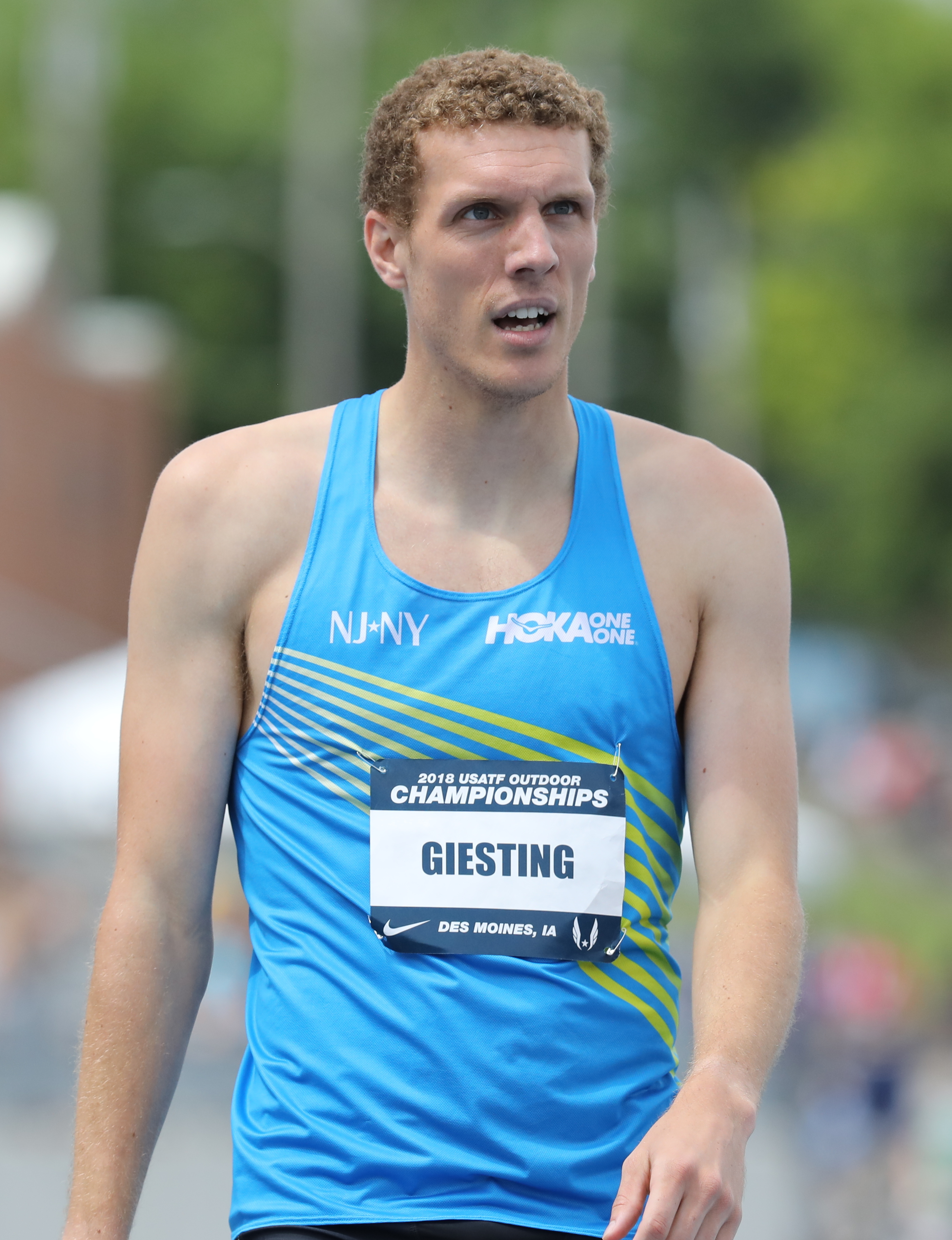
- Giesting at the 2018 USA Outdoor Track and Field Championships

Personal information
- National team: United States
- Born: December 10, 1992 (age 33)

Sport
- Sport: Track and field
- Events: 400 m, 800 m
Medal record
Men's athletics
Representing United States
World Indoor Championships
| Gold medal – first place | 2016 Portland | 4 × 400 m relay |

Christopher Carl "Chris" Giesting (born December 10, 1992) is an American track and field sprinter who competes in the 400-meter dash. He was a gold medalist in the 4 × 400-meter relay at the 2016 IAAF World Indoor Championships. He ran collegiately for the Notre Dame Fighting Irish and won one NCAA indoor title.

== Career ==
Born in Indianapolis to Terry Giesting and Suzanne Westerfeld, Giesting grew up in Batesville, Indiana and attended Batesville High School, where he was part of the school's basketball, track, and cross country running teams. After graduating in 2011, he attended college in-state at the University of Notre Dame, becoming part of their Notre Dame Fighting Irish track team along with fellow sprinter Oye Eyeguokan who rounded out the stellar recruiting class of 2011. In his first year at the institution, he won his first national title at the NCAA Indoor Championships, taking the college's first ever distance medley relay title alongside Johnathan Shawel, Randall Babb and Jeremy Rae. He also completed a sprint double at the Big East Conference Championships, winning both the 200-meter dash and 400 m.

At the 2013 Big East Indoor Championships, he placed in the top three of the 200 m, 500 m and 4 × 400 m relay events. He then went on to place eighth in the 400 m at the NCAA Indoors. He narrowly missed out on retaining his Big East Outdoor double, winning the 400 m, but being runner-up over 200 m. In his third year, he was an NCAA Outdoor finalist in both the 400 m individual and relay events. At the 2014 NCAA Indoor Championships he came fifth in the 400 m and helped Notre Dame to the sprint relay title. In regionals he was the 400 m winner and 200 m runner-up at the Atlantic Coast Conference before goin on to reach the finals of both events outdoors. In respect of his achievements as a student-athlete, he was named ACC Scholar-Athlete of the Year for both the indoor and outdoor seasons.

Giesting performed less well on the track in his final year at Notre Dame, but ended his career with an indoor 200 m best of 21.02 seconds to take his fifth indoor school record. He competed at the NCAA Indoor and Outdoor Championships but did not make any individual final.

In his first international call-up, he represented the United States on home turf in Portland, Oregon, taking the gold medal at the 2016 IAAF World Indoor Championships. Running in a team with Kyle Clemons, Calvin Smith Jr. and Vernon Norwood, they ran the third fastest time ever in the history of the indoor 4 × 400 m relay at 3:02.45 minutes.

Giesting maintained a rivalry with Patrick Feeney, who he raced in high school and as teammates in the collegiate and professional ranks. The two raced 32 times with Giesting winning 18 of those races. They both qualified for the 2016 World Indoor Championships and ran together in the relay heats, although Feeney was replaced in the finals.

In 2017, Giesting joined the New Jersey-New York Track Club under the coaching guidance of Frank Bsue-Gagliano in an effort to move up to the 800m. He would run 1:46.49 in his first year competing at the distance. In 2018, he was a member of the World Indoor Record setting 4 × 800 m with a time of 7:11.30.

== National titles ==
- NCAA Men's Division I Indoor Track and Field Championships
  - Distance medley relay: 2012

== Personal records ==
- 400-meter dash – 45.53 seconds (2014)
- 800 meters – 1:46.48 (2019)

== International competitions ==
| Year | Competition | Venue | Position | Event | Notes |
|---|---|---|---|---|---|
| 2016 | World Indoor Championships | Portland, United States | 1st | 4 × 400 m relay | 3:02.45 |
