= Jamaica at the 2012 Summer Olympics =

- IOC code: JAM
- NOC: Jamaica Olympic Association
- Website: www.joa.org.jm

in London
- Competitors: 50 in 4 sports
- Flag bearers: Usain Bolt (opening); Hansle Parchment (closing)
- Medals Ranked 18th: Gold 4 Silver 5 Bronze 4 Total 13

Summer Olympics appearances (overview)
- 1948; 1952; 1956; 1960; 1964; 1968; 1972; 1976; 1980; 1984; 1988; 1992; 1996; 2000; 2004; 2008; 2012; 2016; 2020; 2024

Other related appearances
- British West Indies (1960 S)

Jamaica competed at the 2012 Summer Olympics in London, from 27 July to 12 August 2012. This was Jamaica's most successful performance in the Summer Olympics; it was approximately the same size from the previous games with a delegation of 50 athletes (25 men and 25 women), and its athletes broke the nation's record for the number of medals (all awarded in the track and field), won in a single games. Jamaica's participation in London marked its sixteenth appearance as an independent nation, although it had previously competed in four other games (including the 1948 debut in the same host city London) as a British colony, and as part of the West Indies Federation. Usain Bolt became the nation's greatest highlight of these games, having won three of Jamaica's four gold medals at London, and breaking an Olympic and world record in two of the three events in which he participated. Because of his repeated successes for the most medals and records, Bolt became Jamaica's first male flag bearer at the opening ceremony since 1984.

== Overview ==
Jamaica's participation in these Olympic games marked its sixteenth appearance as an independent nation since 1964, although it had previously competed in four Olympic games under two different colonies; one as a British colony in 1948, when the nation marked its debut in the same host city for these games, and the other as part of the West Indies Federation, together with Trinidad and Tobago and Barbados.

Although the Jamaican athletes had won at every Olympic games since its debut, the nation's delegation to the London Olympics proved to be its most successful performance at any other Olympic games. It was represented by 50 athletes, competing only in 4 sports (athletics, equestrian, swimming, and taekwondo), which covered the same team size with the previous games. Despite the nation failed to target the number of gold medals from the previous games, Jamaica has created its historical record by winning the most Olympic medals in the overall standings (12 medals, surpassing the nation's performance at the 2008 Summer Olympics in Beijing by less than a single medal).

At these Olympic games, 18 athletes were awarded medals for their performance in events. Four of those athletes (Usain Bolt, Yohan Blake, Shelly-Ann Fraser-Pryce, and Veronica Campbell-Brown) received multiple medals, three of them were Olympic champions from Beijing. Being the greatest highlight in the track and field, Usain Bolt successfully defended his Olympic titles in London, after winning three gold medals in the same events he participated. He was able to break another Olympic record by the fastest time (9.63 seconds) in the men's 100 metres, and the world record, together with his team, in the men's 4 × 100 metres relay (36.84 seconds). Although he failed to break another record in the men's 200 metres, Bolt became the first athlete in Olympic history to successfully defend his title in that event, winning the gold medal. Two of his compatriots, Yohan Blake and Warren Weir had to settle for the silver and the bronze medal, respectively. This was the second time that all Jamaican athletes guaranteed the medal standings in a single event, the first in the women's 100 metres sprint at the Beijing games in 2008. Shelly-Ann Fraser-Pryce also defended her Olympic title by winning the gold medal in the women's 100 metres, ahead of her compatriot Veronica Campbell-Brown, and American sprinter Carmelita Jeter.

Among the 50 athletes competing in these Olympic games, three of them were from equestrian, swimming, and taekwondo. Samantha Albert, the nation's only equestrian rider, was the oldest of the team, at age 41. Swimmer Alia Atkinson, competing in the freestyle and breaststroke events, became the first to reach into the final after winning the swim-off showdown over Canada's Tera van Bailen in the women's 100 m breaststroke, but she narrowly missed the nation's first ever medal in swimming by finishing abruptly in fourth place. Jamaica also marked its debut in taekwondo, which was competed by Kenneth Edwards in the men's super heavyweight division.

== Medalists ==
Medal	Name	Sport	Event	Date
Gold	Shelly-Ann Fraser-Pryce	Athletics	Women's 100 m	4 August
Gold	Usain Bolt	Athletics	Men's 100 m	5 August
Gold	Usain Bolt	Athletics	Men's 200 m	9 August
Gold	Kemar Bailey-Cole*; Yohan Blake; Usain Bolt**; Nesta Carter; Michael Frater	Athletics	Men's 4 × 100 m relay	11 August
Silver	Yohan Blake	Athletics	Men's 100 m	5 August
Silver	Shelly-Ann Fraser-Pryce	Athletics	Women's 200 m	8 August
Silver	Yohan Blake	Athletics	Men's 200 m	9 August
Silver	Schillonie Calvert*; Veronica Campbell-Brown**; Shelly-Ann Fraser-Pryce**; Samantha Henry-Robinson*; Sherone Simpson; Kerron Stewart	Athletics	Women's 4 × 100 m relay	10 August
Silver	Christine Day; Shereefa Lloyd; Rosemarie Whyte; Shericka Williams; Novlene Williams-Mills	Athletics	Women's 4 × 400 m relay	11 August
Bronze	Veronica Campbell-Brown	Athletics	Women's 100 m	4 August
Bronze	Hansle Parchment	Athletics	Men's 110 m hurdles	8 August
Bronze	Warren Weir	Athletics	Men's 200 m	9 August
Bronze	Kaliese Spencer	Athletics	Women's 400 metres hurdles	8 August

* - Heats only; ** - Finals only;

== Athletics ==
Jamaican athletes have so far achieved qualifying standards in the following athletics events (up to a maximum of 3 athletes in each event at the 'A' Standard, and 1 at the 'B' Standard):

Key

- Note–Ranks given for track events are within the athlete's heat only
- Q = Qualified for the next round
- q = Qualified for the next round as a fastest loser or, in field events, by position without achieving the qualifying target
- NR = National record
- N/A = Round not applicable for the event
- Bye = Athlete not required to compete in round

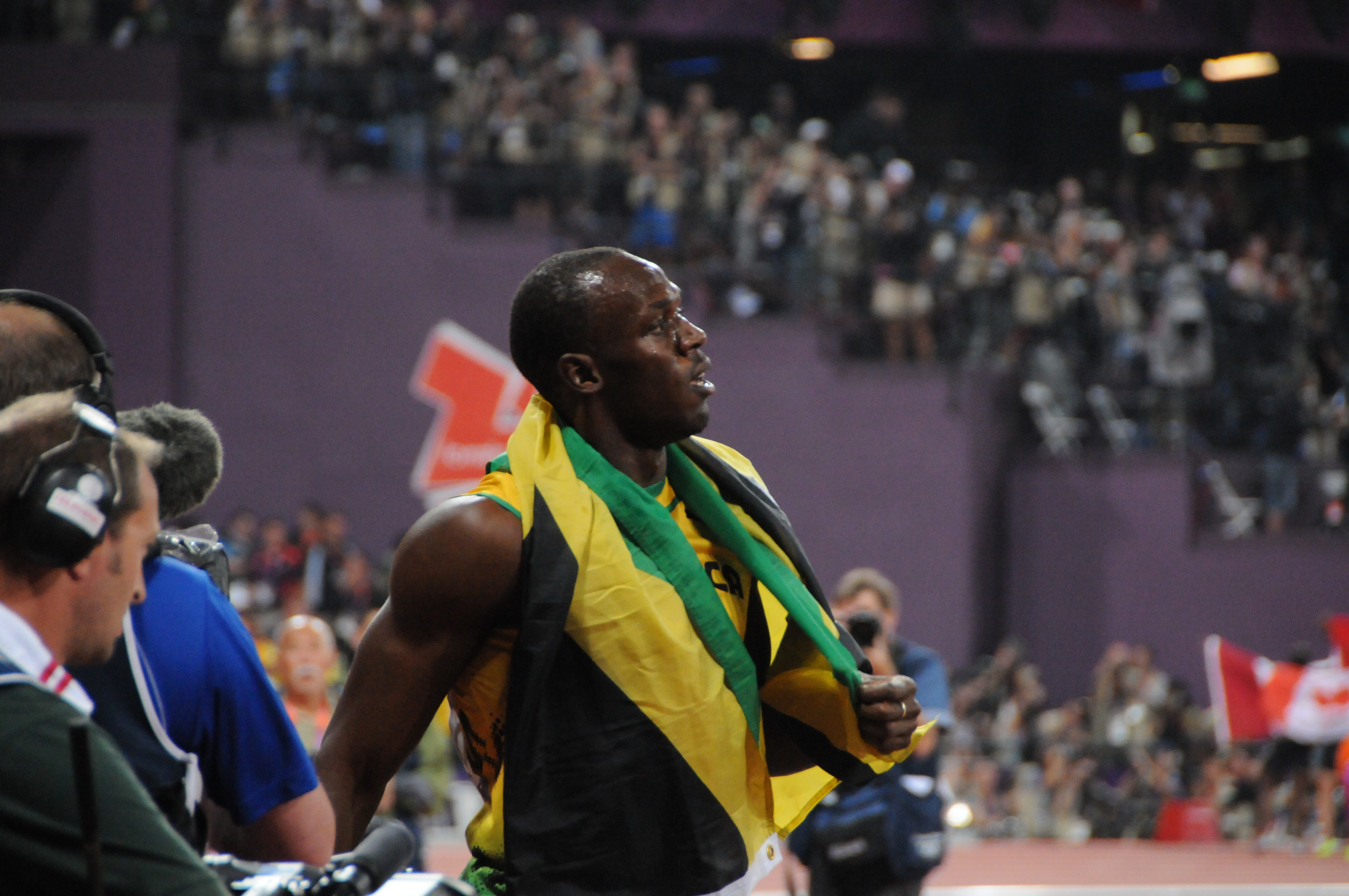
Usain Bolt defended his Olympic titles in both the 100 and 200 metres.

Men
Track & road events

Athlete	Event	Heat		Quarterfinal		Semifinal		Final	
Athlete	Event	Result	Rank	Result	Rank	Result	Rank	Result	Rank
Yohan Blake	100 m	Bye		10.00	1 Q	9.85	1 Q	9.75	2nd place, silver medalist(s)
Usain Bolt	100 m	Bye		10.09	1 Q	9.87	1 Q	9.63 OR	1st place, gold medalist(s)
Asafa Powell	100 m	Bye		10.04	1 Q	9.94	3 q	11.99	8
Yohan Blake	200 m	20.38	1 Q	—		20.01	1 Q	19.44	2nd place, silver medalist(s)
Usain Bolt	200 m	20.39	1 Q	—		20.18	1 Q	19.32	1st place, gold medalist(s)
Warren Weir	200 m	20.29	1 Q	—		20.28	2 Q	19.84	3rd place, bronze medalist(s)
Dane Hyatt	400 m	45.14	4 q	—		45.59	6	Did not advance	
Rusheen McDonald	400 m	46.67	4	—		Did not advance			
Jermaine Gonzales	400 m	46.21	6	—		Did not advance			
Hansle Parchment	110 m hurdles	13.32	2 Q	—		13.14	2 Q	13.12	3rd place, bronze medalist(s)
Richard Phillips	110 m hurdles	13.47	5 q	—		DNF		Did not advance	
Andrew Riley	110 m hurdles	13.59	5	—		Did not advance			
Leford Green	400 m hurdles	49.30	2 Q	—		48.61	2 Q	49.12	7
Roxroy Cato	400 m hurdles	50.22	5	—		Did not advance			
Josef Robertson	400 m hurdles	49.98	5	—		Did not advance			
Kemar Bailey-Cole; Yohan Blake; Usain Bolt; Nesta Carter; Michael Frater	4 × 100 m relay	37.39	1 Q	—				36.84 WR	1st place, gold medalist(s)
Jermaine Gonzales; Riker Hylton; Dane Hyatt; Rusheen McDonald; Errol Nolan; Edino Steele	4 × 400 m relay	DNF		—				Did not advance	

Field events

Athlete	Event	Qualification		Final	
Athlete	Event	Distance	Position	Distance	Position
Damar Forbes	Long jump	7.79	19	Did not advance	
Dorian Scott	Shot put	20.31	11 q	20.61	10
Jason Morgan	Discus throw	57.46	39	Did not advance	
Travis Smikle	Discus throw	61.85	20	Did not advance	

Women
Track & road events

Athlete	Event	Heat		Quarterfinal		Semifinal		Final	
Athlete	Event	Result	Rank	Result	Rank	Result	Rank	Result	Rank
Shelly-Ann Fraser-Pryce	100 m	Bye		11.00	1 Q	10.85	1 Q	10.75	1st place, gold medalist(s)
Veronica Campbell-Brown	100 m	Bye		10.94	1 Q	10.89	2 Q	10.81	3rd place, bronze medalist(s)
Kerron Stewart	100 m	Bye		11.08	3 Q	11.04	4	Did not advance	
Shelly-Ann Fraser-Pryce	200 m	22.71	1 Q	—		22.34	2 Q	22.09	2nd place, silver medalist(s)
Sherone Simpson	200 m	22.97	3 Q	—		22.71	6	Did not advance	
Veronica Campbell-Brown	200 m	22.75	3 Q	—		22.32	1 Q	22.38	4
Christine Day	400 m	51.05	2 Q	—		51.19	4	Did not advance	
Novlene Williams-Mills	400 m	50.88	1 Q	—		49.91	3 q	50.11	5
Rosemarie Whyte	400 m	50.90	2 Q	—		50.98	3 q	50.79	8
Kenia Sinclair	800 m	DNS		—		Did not advance			
Brigitte Foster-Hylton	100 m hurdles	13.98	6	—		Did not advance			
Latoya Greaves	100 m hurdles	DNS		—		Did not advance			
Shermaine Williams	100 m hurdles	13.07	5 q	—		12.83	3	Did not advance	
Melaine Walker	400 m hurdles	54.78	2 Q	—		55.74	4	Did not advance	
Kaliese Spencer	400 m hurdles	54.02	2 Q	—		54.20	2 Q	53.66	3rd place, bronze medalist(s)
Nickiesha Wilson	400 m hurdles	55.53	2 Q	—		55.77	5	Did not advance	
Korene Hinds	3000 m steeplechase	9:37.95	10	—				Did not advance	
Schillonie Calvert; Veronica Campbell-Brown; Shelly-Ann Fraser-Pryce; Samantha Henry-Robinson; Sherone Simpson; Kerron Stewart	4 × 100 m relay	42.37	2 Q	—				41.41 NR	2nd place, silver medalist(s)
Christine Day; Shereefa Lloyd; Rosemarie Whyte; Shericka Williams; Novlene Williams-Mills	4 × 400 m relay	3:25.13	1 Q	—				3:20.95	2nd place, silver medalist(s)

* Dominique Blake was selected to the relay team, but did not compete.

Field events

Athlete	Event	Qualification		Final	
Athlete	Event	Distance	Position	Distance	Position
Allison Randall	Discus throw	58.06	29	Did not advance	
Trecia Smith	Triple jump	14.31	7 q	14.35	7
Kimberly Williams	Triple jump	14.53	2 Q	14.48	6

== Equestrian ==
=== Eventing ===
Athlete	Horse	Event	Dressage		Cross-country			Jumping						Total	
Athlete	Horse	Event	Dressage		Cross-country			Qualifier			Final			Total	
Athlete	Horse	Event	Penalties	Rank	Penalties	Total	Rank	Penalties	Total	Rank	Penalties	Total	Rank	Penalties	Rank
Samantha Albert	Carraig Dubh	Individual	67.20	69	54.00	121.20	59	21.00	142.20	51	Did not advance			142.20	51

== Swimming ==
Swimmers have so far achieved qualifying standards in the following events (up to a maximum of 2 swimmers in each event at the Olympic Qualifying Time (OQT), and potentially 1 at the Olympic Selection Time (OST)):

Women

Athlete	Event	Heat		Semifinal		Final	
Athlete	Event	Time	Rank	Time	Rank	Time	Rank
Alia Atkinson	50 m freestyle	25.98	37	Did not advance			
Alia Atkinson	100 m breaststroke	1:07.39	10 Q	1:07.48	8 WSO	1:06.93	4
Alia Atkinson	200 m breaststroke	2:28.77	27	Did not advance			

Legend = WSO Win swim-off; LSO Lost swim-off

== Taekwondo ==
Jamaica has qualified 1 place in taekwondo.

Athlete	Event	Round of 16	Quarterfinals	Semifinals	Repechage	Bronze Medal	Final	
Athlete	Event	Opposition Result	Opposition Result	Opposition Result	Opposition Result	Opposition Result	Opposition Result	Rank
Kenneth Edwards	Men's +80 kg	Liu Xb (CHN); L 4–6	Did not advance					
