= KBC Night of Athletics =

- Date: July
- Location: Heusden-Zolder, Belgium
- Event type: Track and field
- Website: nachtvandeatletiek.be

The KBC Night of Athletics (Dutch: Nacht van de Atletiek) is an annual athletics event at the Stadium De Veen in Heusden-Zolder, Belgium. It is officially presented and sponsored by the KBC Bank.

The meeting previously took place in Hechtel-Eksel, Belgium from 1982 to 1999.

== Meeting records ==
=== Men ===
Event	Record	Athlete	Nationality	Date	Ref.
100 m	10.12 (+0.2 m/s)	Shawn Crawford	United States	14 July 2001	
200 m	20.25 (+1.4 m/s)	Shawn Crawford	United States	14 July 2001	
300 m	32.69	Patrick Feeney	United States	18 July 2015	
400 m	44.91	Gary Kikaya	Democratic Republic of the Congo	2005	
400 m	44.91	Jonathan Borlée	Belgium	7 July 2012	
800 m	1:41.51	David Rudisha	Kenya	10 July 2010	
1500 m	3:29.18	Hicham El Guerrouj	Morocco	2004	
Mile	3:53.93	Han Kulker	Netherlands	1985	
2000 m	4:48.74	John Kibowen	Kenya	1998	
3000 m	7:41.17	Philip Mosima	Kenya	1998	
Two miles	7:58.61	Daniel Komen	Kenya	1997	
5000 m	12:58.58	Moukhled Al-Outaibi	Saudi Arabia	2005	
10,000 m	27:35.01	Paul Biwott	Kenya	20 July 2002	
110 m hurdles	13.26	Shaun Bownes	South Africa	2001	
400 m hurdles	48.76	Torrance Zellner	United States	1996	
2000 m steeplechase	5:22.24	William Van Dijck	Belgium	1987	
3000 m steeplechase	8:00.57	Paul Koech	Kenya	2008	
High jump	2.30 m	Eddy Annys	Belgium	1986	
Pole vault	5.80 m	Timothy Mack	United States	2004	
Long jump	8.25 m	Erik Nijs	Belgium	1996	
Triple jump	17.06 m	Timothy Rusan	United States	2003	
Shot put	21.29 m	Kevin Toth	United States	1994	
Discus throw	65.83 m	Anthony Washington	United States	2000	
Hammer throw	70.94 m	Philip Servey	Australia	1986	
Javelin throw	84.23 m	Roman Avramenko	Ukraine	13 July 2013	
4 × 400 m relay	3:02.81	Nils Duerinck; Jonathan Borlée; Antoine Gillet; Kevin Borlée	Belgium	16 July 2011	

=== Women ===
Event	Record	Athlete	Nationality	Date	Ref.
100 m	10.83	Zhanna Pintusevich-Block	Ukraine	20 July 2002	
200 m	22.42	Marie-José Pérec	France	1996	
400 m	51.17	Aminatou Seyni	Niger	21 July 2018	
300 m	36.54	Cynthia Bolingo Mbongo	Belgium	6 September 2020	
800 m	1:55.19	Jolanda Čeplak	Slovenia	20 July 2002	
1000 m	2:37.49	Nouria Mérah-Benida	Ethiopia	2003	
1500 m	4:01.96	Abeba Aregawi	Ethiopia	2010	
Mile	4:24.40	Natalya Yevdokimova	Russia	2003	
2000 m	5:42.14	Susan Muthoni	Kenya	2001	
3000 m	8:46.99	Lyubov Kremlyova	Russia	1992	
5000 m	14:30.88	Gete Wami	Ethiopia	2000	
10,000 m	30:51.30	Berhane Adere	Ethiopia	2000	
100 m hurdles	12.56	Lolo Jones	United States	2006	
400 m hurdles	53.40	Sandra GloLong	United States	2004	
3000 m steeplechase	9:22.12	Hanane Ouhaddou	Morocco	2009	
High jump	2.04 m	Inga Babakova	Ukraine	1995	
Pole vault	4.76 m	Anzhelika Sidorova	Russia	18 July 2015	
Pole vault	4.76 m	Sandi Morris	United States	18 July 2015	
Long jump	6.58 m	Nicole Boegman	Australia	1999	
Triple jump	14.46 m	Svetlana Bolshakova	Belgium	2009	
Shot put	20.00 m	Zhihong Huang	China	1994	
Discus throw	66.26 m	Mette Bergmann	Norway	1994	
Javelin throw	65.44 m	Joanna Stone	Australia	1997	
4 × 400 m relay	3:31.10		Belgium	21 July 2018	
