= Alonzo Russell (sprinter) =

Bahamian sprinter

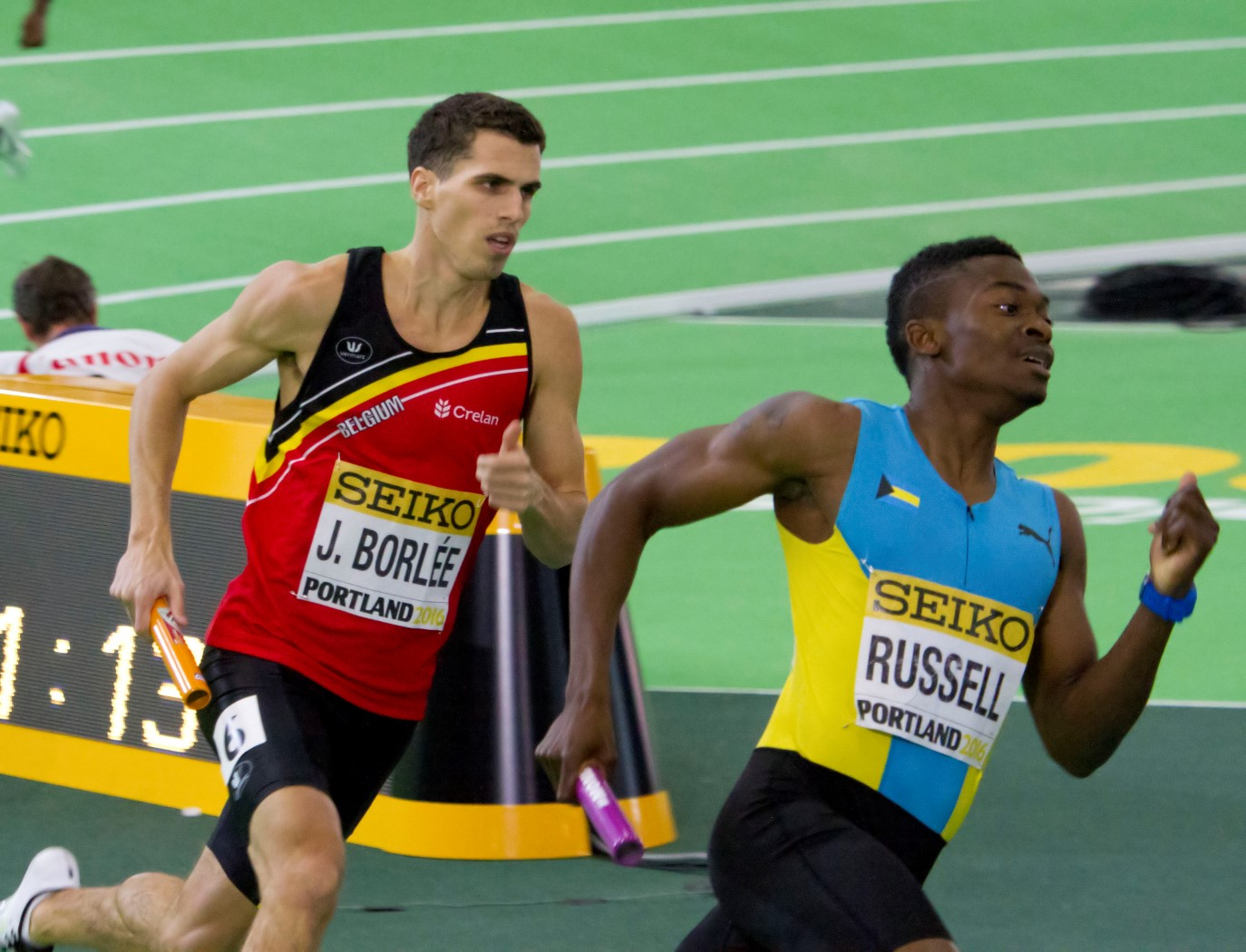
- Russell (right) in 2016

Personal information
- Born: 8 February 1992 (age 34) Freeport, Bahamas
- Education: Florida State University
- Height: 1.73 m (5 ft 8 in)
- Weight: 68 kg (150 lb)

Sport
- Sport: Athletics
- Event: 400 m
- College team: Florida State Seminoles
- Coached by: Ken Harnden
Medal record
Olympic Games
Bronze medal – third place	2016 Rio de Janeiro	4×400 m relay
World Indoor Championships
Silver medal – second place	2016 Portland	4 × 400 m relay
Commonwealth Games
Silver medal – second place	2018 Gold Coast	4 × 400 m relay
Silver medal – second place	2014 Glasgow	4 × 400 m relay
World Relay Championships
Silver medal – second place	2015 Nassau	4×400 m relay
NACAC Championships
Silver medal – second place	2015 Costa Rica	4x400m relay
Silver medal – second place	2018 Toronto	4x400m relay
Bronze medal – third place	2022 Freeport	4×400 m relay
NACAC U-23 Championships
Silver medal – second place	2012 Irapuato	4x400 m relay
CARIFTA Games (Junior)
Silver medal – second place	2010 George Town	4×400 m relay
CARIFTA Games Junior (U17)
Bronze medal – third place	2008 Basseterre	4x400 m relay

Alonzo Russell (born 8 February 1992) is a Bahamian sprinter specialising in the 400 metres. He represented his country at the 2015 World Championships and 2016 World Indoor Championships, as well as the 2016 and 2020 Summer Olympics.

His personal bests in the event are 44.73 seconds outdoors, and 46.38 seconds indoors (Clemson 2018).

== Competition record ==
Year	Competition	Venue	Position	Event	Notes
Representing the Bahamas
2008	CARIFTA Games (U17)	Basseterre, Saint Kitts and Nevis	6th	400 m	51.22
2008	CARIFTA Games (U17)	Basseterre, Saint Kitts and Nevis	3rd	4 × 400 m relay	3:22.77
2010	CARIFTA Games (U20)	George Town, Cayman Islands	2nd	4 × 400 m relay	3:10:69
2010	World Junior Championships	Moncton, Canada	17th (h)	4 × 400 m relay	3:14.42
2012	NACAC U23 Championships	Irapuato, Mexico	5th	400 m	46.56
2012	NACAC U23 Championships	Irapuato, Mexico	2nd	4 × 400 m relay	3:04.33
2014	Commonwealth Games	Glasgow, United Kingdom	2nd	4 × 400 m relay	3:00.51
2015	Pan American Games	Toronto, Canada	4th	4 × 400 m relay	3:00.34
2015	NACAC Championships	San José, Costa Rica	7th	400 m	46.20
2015	NACAC Championships	San José, Costa Rica	2nd	4 × 400 m relay	3:00.53
2015	World Championships	Beijing, China	–	4 × 400 m relay	DQ
2016	World Indoor Championships	Portland, United States	10th (sf)	400 m	47.07
2016	World Indoor Championships	Portland, United States	3rd	4 × 400 m relay	3:04.75
2016	Olympic Games	Rio de Janeiro, Brazil	–	400 m	DQ
2016	Olympic Games	Rio de Janeiro, Brazil	2nd	4 × 400 m relay	2:58.49
2017	World Championships	London, United Kingdom	11th (h)	4 × 400 m relay	3:03.04
2018	World Indoor Championships	Birmingham, United Kingdom	–	400 m	DQ
2018	Commonwealth Games	Gold Coast, Australia	2nd	4 × 400 m relay	3:01.92
2018	Central American and Caribbean Games	Barranquilla, Colombia	6th	400 m	46.18
2018	Central American and Caribbean Games	Barranquilla, Colombia	5th	4 × 400 m relay	3:07.31
2018	NACAC Championships	Toronto, Canada	6th	400 m	46.26
2019	Pan American Games	Lima, Peru	7th	4 × 400 m relay	3:09.98
2019	World Championships	Doha, Qatar	25th (h)	400 m	45.91
2021	Olympic Games	Tokyo, Japan	23rd (sf)	400 m	46.04
2022	NACAC Championships	Freeport, Bahamas	3rd	4 × 400 m relay	3:06.21
2023	World Championships	Budapest, Hungary	41st (h)	400 m	46.95
2025	NACAC Championships	Freeport, Bahamas	12th (h)	400 m	46.81
