= 2016 IAAF World Indoor Championships – Men's 4 × 400 metres relay =

Men's 4 × 400 metres relay at the 2016 IAAF World Indoor Championships
- Venue: Oregon Convention Center
- Dates: March 19 (heats); March 20 (final)
- Competitors: 28 from 7 nations
- Teams: 7
- Winning time: 3:02.45

Medalists
gold medal	Kyle Clemons; Calvin Smith; Christopher Giesting; Vernon Norwood	United States
silver medal	Michael Mathieu; Alonzo Russell; Shavez Hart; Chris Brown	Bahamas
bronze medal	Jarrin Solomon; Lalonde Gordon; Ade Alleyne-Forte; Deon Lendore	Trinidad and Tobago

Video on YouTube Official Video

The men's 4 × 400 metres relay at the 2016 IAAF World Indoor Championships took place on March 19 and 20, 2016.

In the first leg of the final, Bahamas' Michael Mathieu was the first to break, keeping Kyle Clemons behind him through the entire leg. Dylan Borlée from the Borlée Brothers Team, Belgium, held off Jamaica's Ricardo Chambers until just before the handoff. The USA executed an ideal first handoff, with Clemons just edging ahead of Mathieu on the final straightaway, reaching across the zone to hand off to Calvin Smith Jr. who gained a two-metre lead over Alonzo Russell in the exchange. From there, USA went unchallenged to the gold medal, continually expanding the lead. After a short battle with Jamaica's Dane Hyatt, Jonathan Borlée ducked in behind Russell. Lalonde Gordon also ran a strong leg for Trinidad and Tobago to put them near Borlée at the handoff. Robin Vanderbemden was the only non-Borlée brother on the Belgian team. Almost immediately after getting the baton in his right hand, he tangled elbows with Ade Alleyne-Forte, suddenly the Belgian baton was on the ground with Vanderbemden running back into the infield to retrieve it, their race was over and the medal positions established. With the US 25 metres ahead, Deon Lendore made an attempt to pass Chris Brown on the anchor leg but the veteran, Masters world record holder Brown held him off.

== Results ==
=== Heats ===
First 2 teams of each heat (Q) and the next 2 fastest (q) qualified for the final.

Rank	Heat	Nation	Athletes	Time	Notes
1	2	United States	Elvyonn Bailey, Calvin Smith Jr., Christopher Giesting, Patrick Feeney	3:05.41	Q
2	2	Jamaica	Ricardo Chambers, Dane Hyatt, Demish Gaye, Nathon Allen	3:07.30	Q, SB
3	1	Belgium	Dylan Borlée, Jonathan Borlée, Robin Vanderbemden, Kévin Borlée	3:07.39	Q, SB
4	1	Bahamas	Michael Mathieu, Shavez Hart, Ashley Riley, Chris Brown	3:07.55	Q, SB
5	1	Trinidad and Tobago	Rondel Sorrillo, Jarrin Solomon, Ade Alleyne-Forte, Machel Cedenio	3:07.83	q, SB
6	2	Nigeria	Chidi Okezie, Noah Akwu, Abiola Onakoya, Isah Salihu	3:07.98	q, SB
7	1	South Africa	Thapelo Phora, Ofentse Mogawane, Jon Seeliger, Shaun de Jager	3:08.45	NR

=== Final ===
The race started on March 20 at 14:50.

Rank	Nation	Athletes	Time	Notes
1st place, gold medalist(s)	United States	Kyle Clemons, Calvin Smith Jr., Christopher Giesting, Vernon Norwood	3:02.45	WL
2nd place, silver medalist(s)	Bahamas	Michael Mathieu, Alonzo Russell, Shavez Hart, Chris Brown	3:04.75	NR
3rd place, bronze medalist(s)	Trinidad and Tobago	Jarrin Solomon, Lalonde Gordon, Ade Alleyne-Forte, Deon Lendore	3:05.51	NR
4	Jamaica	Ricardo Chambers, Dane Hyatt, Demish Gaye, Fitzroy Dunkley	3:06.02	SB
5	Nigeria	Noah Akwu, Chidi Okezie, Abiola Onakoya, Samson Oghenewegba Nathaniel	3:08.55	
6	Belgium	Dylan Borlée, Jonathan Borlée, Robin Vanderbemden, Kévin Borlée	3:09.71	
