= Lalonde Gordon =

Trinidad and Tobago sprinter

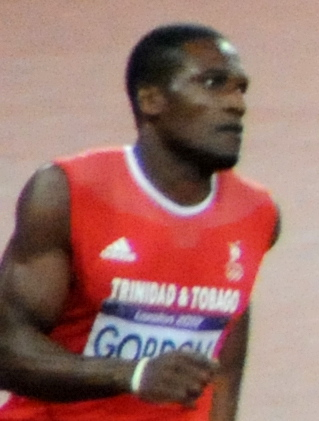
- Gordon in the 2012 Olympic final

Personal information
- Born: 25 November 1988 (age 37) Lowlands, Tobago, Trinidad and Tobago
- Education: Mohawk Valley Community College; Morgan State University
- Height: 1.90 m (6 ft 3 in)
- Weight: 83 kg (183 lb)

Sport
- Country: Trinidad and Tobago
- Sport: Track and field
- Event: 400 metres
- Club: Zenith Velocity AC
- Coached by: Trevor Green
Medal record
Olympic Games
Bronze medal – third place	2012 London	400 m
Bronze medal – third place	2012 London	4 × 400 m relay
World Championships
Gold medal – first place	2017 London	4 × 400 m relay
Silver medal – second place	2015 Beijing	4 × 400 m relay
World Indoor Championships
Bronze medal – third place	2012 Istanbul	4 × 400 m relay
Bronze medal – third place	2016 Portland	4 × 400 m relay
Commonwealth Games
Bronze medal – third place	2014 Glasgow	400 m
Bronze medal – third place	2014 Glasgow	4 × 400 m relay
CAC Championships
Silver medal – second place	2013 Morelia	200 m

Lalonde Keida Gordon, HBM (born 25 November 1988) is a Tobagonian male track and field sprinter who specialises in the 400 metres. He won the bronze medal at the 2012 London Olympics with a personal best of 44.52 seconds. He is the fifth fastest 400 m runner from his country after Jereem Richards, Machel Cedenio, Ian Morris and Deon Lendore.

He took a second Olympic bronze with the 4 × 400 metres relay team in London, setting a national record in the process. He was also part of the Trinidad and Tobago relay teams that won gold at the 2017 IAAF World Championships, bronze at the 2012 IAAF World Indoor Championships, silver at the 2011 CAC Championships, and bronze at the 2010 CAC Games.

== Career ==
Born in Lowlands on the island of Tobago, he competed in track and field from an early age. He was named after former WBC light heavyweight champion, Donny Lalonde, who defeated Trinidadian fighter, Leslie Stewart, in a fight held in Port of Spain, Trinidad on 29 May 1988, a few months before he was born. He moved to New York City in the United States at the age of seven, but gave up running as a teenager around 2003. While studying at Mohawk Valley Community College he returned to training in 2009 with the hope of representing the school. He competed in the 200 metres and 400 metres, later choosing to focus on the longer event, despite the fact that he took an initial dislike to it. After leaving Mohawk Valley, Gordon ran for and graduated from Morgan State University.

Gordon ran at the 2010 national championships and broke 21 seconds for the 200 m (running 20.96 seconds) and went under 47 seconds in the 400 m, taking second place behind Zwede Hewitt. He teamed up with Hewitt for the 4 × 400 metres relay at the Central American and Caribbean Games a month later and won a bronze medal. Gordon was chosen to run individually at the 2010 Commonwealth Games and he was a semifinalist with a personal best run of 46.33 seconds. The next season, he had his first win abroad at the Rabat Meeting where he edged William Collazo in a new best of 45.51 seconds. At 2011 Central American and Caribbean Championships, he reached the 400 m final and was a silver medallist in the relay. He focused on the shorter sprints at the 2011 Trinidad and Tobago Championships and finished the contest with third place in the 200 m and a win in the 4 × 100 metres relay.

He started the 2012 season indoors and ran a world-leading time of 46.43 to win the 400 m at the New Balance Games in New York. He was second in his heat at the 2012 IAAF World Indoor Championships, but was disqualified for a lane infraction. He led off a relay team of Renny Quow, Jereem Richards and Jarrin Solomon which went on to break the national indoor record for the event and take the bronze medal behind the United States and Great Britain. Outdoors, he set three personal bests on New York's Road to London meet series, setting times of 10.45 for the 100 metres and 20.62 for the 200 m in May, before winning the 400 m event in 45.33 seconds in June. At that year's national championships he beat defending champion Quow in the 400 m and helped set a new national record (3:00.45 minutes) in the 4 × 400 m relay.

He was chosen for the relay for the Trinidad and Tobago Olympic team, but did not have an individual place because he had not achieved the Olympic "A" qualifying standard. His mother paid for a flight to the US National Club Championship in Omaha in July and he improved his best with a winning run of 45.02 seconds. Having achieved the "A" standard, he headed to England in preparation for the 2012 London Olympics. He marked himself out as a medal contender by winning his semi-final with the fastest qualifying time – an unexpectedly quick best of 44.58 seconds. He bettered that time again to take the bronze medal in 44.52 seconds in the 400 m Olympic final, becoming only the second man from his nation to take an Olympic medal in the event (after Wendell Mottley's silver in 1964). Boosted by his performance, he encouraged the relay team to perform just as well and a team of Gordon, Jarrin Solomon, Ade Alleyne-Forte and Deon Lendore ran a national record of 3:00.38 minutes to win their qualifier. The quartet went even faster in the final and pipped Britain to the bronze medal position with a time of 2:59.40 minutes, becoming the country's second medalling team in the event (again achieved by Mottley at the 1964 Olympics).

He was also part of the Trinidad and Tobago teams that won gold at the 2017 World Championships, silver at the 2015 World Championships, and bronze at the 2016 World Indoor Championships. At the 2014 Commonwealth Games, he won two bronzes, in the 400 m and the 4 × 400 m. He ran a personal best in the individual 400 m.

== Personal bests ==
- 100 metres: 10.45 sec (2012)
- 200 metres: 20.16 sec (2013)
- 200 metres (indoor): 20.49 sec (2017)
- 400 metres: 44.52 (2012)
- 400 metres (indoor): 45.17 sec (2014)
- 500 metres (indoor): 1:02.83 min (2012)
