= 2014 IAAF World Indoor Championships – Men's 400 metres =

Men's 400 metres at the 2014 IAAF World Indoor Championships
- Venue: Ergo Arena
- Dates: 7 March (heats and semifinals); 8 March (final)
- Competitors: 27 from 22 nations
- Winning time: 45.24

Medalists
gold medal	Pavel Maslák	Czech Republic
silver medal	Chris Brown	Bahamas
bronze medal	Kyle Clemons	United States

The men's 400 metres at the 2014 IAAF World Indoor Championships took place on 7–8 March 2014.

== Records ==
Standing records prior to the 2014 IAAF World Indoor Championships
World record	Kerron Clement (USA)	44.57	Fayetteville, United States	12 March 2005
Championship record	Nery Brenes (CRC)	45.11	Istanbul, Turkey	10 March 2012
World leading	Lalonde Gordon (TRI)	45.17	Boston, United States	8 February 2014
African record	Sunday Bada (NGR)	45.51	Paris, France	9 March 1997
Asian record	Shunji Karube (JPN)	45.76	Paris, France	9 March 1997
European record	Thomas Schönlebe (GDR)	45.05	Sindelfingen, West Germany	5 February 1988
North and Central American and Caribbean record	Kerron Clement (USA)	44.57	Fayetteville, United States	12 March 2005
Oceanian record	Daniel Batman (AUS)	45.93	Birmingham, Great Britain	2 March 2003
South American record	Bayano Kamani (PAN)	46.26	Boston, United States	29 January 2005

== Qualification standards ==
Indoor	Outdoor
46.80	45.10

== Schedule ==
Date	Time	Round
7 March 2014	10:45	Heats
7 March 2014	21:25	Semifinals
8 March 2014	20:30	Final

== Results ==
=== Heats ===
Qualification: First 2 in each heat (Q) and the next 2 fastest (q) qualified for the semi-finals.

Rank	Heat	Lane	Name	Nationality	Time	Notes
1	5	6	Chris Brown	Bahamas	45.84	Q, SB
2	5	5	Pavel Maslák	Czech Republic	46.01	Q
3	1	5	Lalonde Gordon	Trinidad and Tobago	46.07	Q
4	1	4	Edino Steele	Jamaica	46.38	Q
5	4	6	Kyle Clemons	United States	46.42	Q
6	1	6	Marek Niit	Estonia	46.52	q
7	3	5	Luguelín Santos	Dominican Republic	46.54	Q
=8	2	5	David Verburg	United States	46.62	Q
=8	3	4	Nery Brenes	Costa Rica	46.62	Q
10	3	6	Nigel Levine	Great Britain	46.64	q
11	5	4	Nick Ekelund-Arenander	Denmark	46.68	
12	3	1	Anderson Henriques	Brazil	46.82	PB
13	2	3	Rafał Omelko	Poland	46.84	Q
14	4	4	Akheem Gauntlett	Jamaica	46.85	Q
15	2	4	Jarrin Solomon	Trinidad and Tobago	46.86	
16	4	2	Tabarie Henry	United States Virgin Islands	46.87	
17	1	3	Vitaliy Butrym	Ukraine	46.98	
18	5	3	Mark Ujakpor	Spain	47.16	
19	1	2	Erison Hurtault	Dominica	47.25	
20	2	6	Gustavo Cuesta	Dominican Republic	47.43	
21	4	3	Bram Peters	Netherlands	47.50	
22	3	3	Donald Sanford	Israel	47.90	
23	2	2	Nika Kartavtsevi	Georgia	48.68	SB
24	5	2	Falcón Fagúndez	Uruguay	49.89	PB
25	5	1	Jannot Bacar	Comoros	50.11	
	3	2	Siologa Viliamu Sepa	Samoa	DQ	R163.3(a)
	4	5	Richard Buck	Great Britain	DQ	R163.2

=== Semifinals ===
Qualification: First 3 in each heat (Q) qualified for the finals.

Rank	Heat	Lane	Name	Nationality	Time	Notes
1	1	3	Pavel Maslák	Czech Republic	45.79	Q
2	1	5	Kyle Clemons	United States	46.06	Q
3	2	5	Chris Brown	Bahamas	46.19	Q
4	2	4	Nery Brenes	Costa Rica	46.25	Q, SB
5	1	6	Lalonde Gordon	Trinidad and Tobago	46.29	Q
6	2	3	David Verburg	United States	46.33	Q
7	2	6	Luguelín Santos	Dominican Republic	46.37	
8	1	1	Nigel Levine	Great Britain	46.84	
9	2	2	Rafał Omelko	Poland	46.94	
10	2	1	Akheem Gauntlett	Jamaica	47.13	
11	1	2	Marek Niit	Estonia	47.67	
	1	4	Edino Steele	Jamaica	DQ	R163.3(b)

=== Final ===
Rank	Lane	Name	Nationality	Time	Notes
1st place, gold medalist(s)	5	Pavel Maslák	Czech Republic	45.24	NR
2nd place, silver medalist(s)	6	Chris Brown	Bahamas	45.58	PB
3rd place, bronze medalist(s)	4	Kyle Clemons	United States	45.74	
4	1	David Verburg	United States	46.21	
5	2	Lalonde Gordon	Trinidad and Tobago	46.39	
6	3	Nery Brenes	Costa Rica	47.32	
