= Deon Lendore =

Trinidadian sprinter (1992–2022)

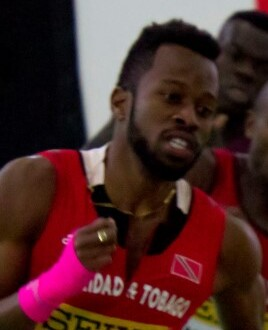
- Lendore at the 2016 World Indoor Championships

Personal information
- Born: 28 October 1992 Arima, Trinidad, Trinidad and Tobago
- Died: 10 January 2022 (aged 29) Milam County, Texas, U.S.
- Education: Texas A&M University
- Height: 1.91 m (6 ft 3 in)
- Weight: 78 kg (172 lb)

Sport
- Sport: Running
- Event: 400 metres

Achievements and titles
- Personal bests: 200 m: 20.40; 300 m: 33.21; 400 m: 44.36; 600 m: 1:16.90
Medal record
Olympic Games
| Bronze medal – third place | 2012 London | 4×400 m relay |
World Championships
| Silver medal – second place | 2015 Beijing | 4×400 m relay |
World Indoor Championships
| Bronze medal – third place | 2018 Birmingham | 400 m |
| Bronze medal – third place | 2016 Portland | 400 m |
| Bronze medal – third place | 2016 Portland | 4×400 m relay |
Pan American Games
| Bronze medal – third place | 2019 Lima | 4×400 m relay |
CAC Championships
| Silver medal – second place | 2011 Mayagüez | 4×400 m relay |
Pan American Junior Championships
| Silver medal – second place | 2009 Port of Spain | 4×400 m relay |
| Silver medal – second place | 2011 Miramar | 400 m |
| Silver medal – second place | 2011 Miramar | 4×400 m relay |

Deon Kristofer Lendore (28 October 1992 – 10 January 2022) was a Trinidad and Tobago sprinter who specialised in the 400 metres. He won a bronze medal in the 4 × 400 metres relay event at the 2012 Summer Olympics, and won medals at the Pan American Junior Athletics Championships, World Athletics Championships and World Athletics Indoor Championships. Lendore died in a car collision in Texas, United States, on 10 January 2022.

== Early life and college career ==
Lendore was born in Mount Hope, Trinidad and Tobago, where he started competing for Abilene Christian Wildcats. He attended Queen's Royal College, and later moved to Texas and attended Texas A&M University, where he competed in the school's track and field team from 2012 to 2014. In 2014, He won The Bowerman, which is the highest individual honor in NCAA track and field. He had won all 14 events in the 2014 season, including the NCAA indoor and outdoor championships.

Lendore later worked as a volunteer coach at Texas A&M University, from 2020 until 2022.

== Professional career ==
Lendore's first international event was the 2009 World Youth Championships in Athletics. The year, he was part of the Trinidad and Tobago team that won a silver medal in the 4 × 400 metres relay event at the 2009 Pan American Junior Athletics Championships. In 2010 he competed in the World Athletics U20 Championships.

Lendore won a silver medal in the 400 metres at the 2011 Pan American Junior Athletics Championships in Miramar, Florida. He was part of the Trinidad and Tobago team that came third in the 4 × 400 metres relay event at the 2012 Summer Olympics in London. He ran the final leg of the relay, and held off Briton Martyn Rooney. Lendore was part of the Trinidad and Tobago team that came second in the 4 × 400 metres relay event at the 2015 World Championships in Athletics in Beijing, China. Lendore competed at the 2016 Summer Olympics in Rio de Janeiro, Brazil, He won a bronze medal at the 400 metres event at the 2016 IAAF World Indoor Championships. He was not selected for the Trinidad and Tobago relay team for the 2017 World Championships in Athletics.

Lendore won a bronze medal at the 400 metres event at the 2018 IAAF World Indoor Championships, after two athletes who finished ahead of him were disqualified. He was part of the Trinidad and Tobago team that came fourth in the 4 × 400 metres relay event at the 2018 Commonwealth Games. Later in the year, he was not awarded funding by his country's Incentives and Rewards Framework. He was part of the Trinidad and Tobago team that won the 4 × 400 metres relay event at the 2019 IAAF World Relays in Yokohama, Japan. In the same year, he was part of the Trinidad and Tobago team that won the 4 × 400 metres relay event at the 2019 Pan American Games.

Lendore competed at the delayed 2020 Summer Olympics in Tokyo, Japan. In Tokyo, he reached the semi-finals of the 400 metres competition, and was part of the Trinidad and Tobago team that finished eighth in the 4 × 400 metres relay event. Later in the year, he finished third in the 400 metres event at the 2021 Diamond League event in Zürich.

== Competition record ==
| Year | Competition | Venue | Position | Event | Notes |
Representing Trinidad and Tobago
| 2008 | CARIFTA Games (U-17) | Basseterre, Saint Kitts and Nevis | 4th | 400 m | 50.06 |
| 2008 | CARIFTA Games (U-17) | Basseterre, Saint Kitts and Nevis | 2nd | 4 × 400 m | 3:21.20 |
| 2010 | CARIFTA Games (U-20) | George Town, Cayman Islands | 2nd | 400 m | 46.59 |
| 2010 | CARIFTA Games (U-20) | George Town, Cayman Islands | 3rd | 4 × 400 m | 3:11.59 |
| 2010 | Central American and Caribbean; Junior Championships (U-20) | Santo Domingo, Dominican Republic | 3rd | 400 m | 47.16 |
| 2010 | Central American and Caribbean; Junior Championships (U-20) | Santo Domingo, Dominican Republic | 1st | 4x400 m | 3:08.19 |
| 2010 | World Junior Championships | Moncton, New Brunswick, Canada | 15th (sf) | 400m | 47.49 |
| 2010 | World Junior Championships | Moncton, New Brunswick, Canada | 10th (h) | 4 × 400 m | 3:10.87 |
| 2011 | CARIFTA Games (U-20) | Montego Bay, Jamaica | 8th | 400 m | 70.25 |
| 2011 | CARIFTA Games (U-20) | Montego Bay, Jamaica | 1st | 4 × 400 m | 3:08:96 |
| 2015 | World Championships | Beijing, China | 2nd | 4 × 400 m | 2:58.20 |
| 2016 | World Indoor Championships | Portland, United States | 3rd | 400 m | 46.17 |
| 2016 | World Indoor Championships | Portland, United States | 3rd | 4 × 400 m | 3:05.51 |
| 2016 | Olympic Games | Rio de Janeiro, Brazil | 35th (h) | 400 m | 46.15 |
| 2016 | Olympic Games | Rio de Janeiro, Brazil | – | 4 × 400 m | DQ |
| 2017 | World Relays | Nassau, Bahamas | 1st (h) | 4 × 400 m | 3:02.51 |
| 2018 | World Indoor Championships | Birmingham, United Kingdom | 3rd | 400 m | 46.37 |
| 2018 | World Indoor Championships | Birmingham, United Kingdom | 4th | 4 × 400 m | 3:02.52 |
| 2018 | Commonwealth Games | Gold Coast, Australia | 4th | 4 × 400 m | 3:02.85 |
| 2019 | World Relays | Yokohama, Japan | 1st | 4 × 400 m | 3:00.81 |
| 2019 | Pan American Games | Lima, Peru | 3rd | 4 × 400 m | 3:02.25 |
| 2019 | World Championships | Doha, Qatar | 5th | 4 × 400 m | 3:00.74 |
| 2021 | Olympic Games | Tokyo, Japan | 9th (sf) | 400 m | 44.93 |
| 2021 | Olympic Games | Tokyo, Japan | 8th | 4 × 400 m | 3:00.85 |

== Death ==
On 10 January 2022, Lendore was involved in a car crash on FM 485 in Milam County in Texas and was pronounced dead at the scene. A statement from the Texas Department of Public Safety said that three vehicles were involved in the collision, and they were investigating the events. His funeral was held on 3 March, and on the same day, Abilene Christian Wildcats announced that they would rename their annual track and field meeting after Lendore.
