= Ade Alleyne-Forte =

Trinidadian sprinter (born 1988)

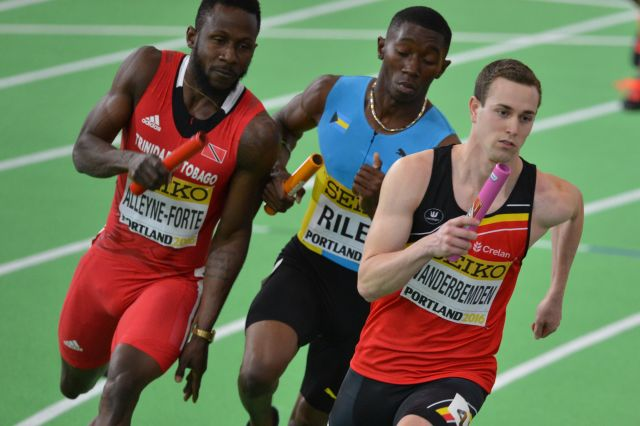
- Ade Alleyne-Forte (left) at the 2016 IAAF World Indoor Championships

Personal information
- Born: 11 October 1988 (age 37) San Fernando, Trinidad and Tobago
- Height: 1.80 m (5 ft 11 in)
- Weight: 73 kg (161 lb)

Sport
- Country: Trinidad and Tobago
- Sport: Athletics
- Event: 400 metres
Medal record
Olympic Games
Bronze medal – third place	2012 London	4 × 400 m relay
World Indoor Championships
Bronze medal – third place	2016 Portland	4×400 m relay
Pan American Junior Championships
Gold medal – first place	2007 São Paulo	4 x 400 m Relay

Ade Franci Alleyne-Forte (born 11 October 1988) is a Trinidadian sprinter specialising in the 400 metres. He competed in the 4 × 400 metres relay at the 2012 Summer Olympics winning the bronze medal. He repeated that success at the 2016 World Indoor Championships.

His personal bests in the event are 46.13 seconds outdoors (Port of Spain 2012) and 46.88 seconds indoors (College Station 2013).

== Competition record ==
Year	Competition	Venue	Position	Event	Notes
Representing Trinidad and Tobago
2005	CARIFTA Games (U20)	Bacolet, Trinidad and Tobago	16th (h)	200 m	22.52
2005	CARIFTA Games (U20)	Bacolet, Trinidad and Tobago	2nd	4 × 400 m relay	3:10.32
2005	World Youth Championships	Marrakesh, Morocco	41st (h)	200 m	22.34
2005	World Youth Championships	Marrakesh, Morocco	20th (sf)	400 m	49.92
2005	World Youth Championships	Marrakesh, Morocco	2nd	Medley relay	1:52.51
2006	CARIFTA Games (U20)	Les Abymes, Guadeloupe	9th (sf)	200 m	21.90
2006	Central American and Caribbean; Junior Championships (U20)	Port of Spain, Trinidad and Tobago	2nd	4 × 400 m relay	3:07.51
2006	World Junior Championships	Beijing, China	9th (h)	4 × 400 m relay	3:08.27
2007	CARIFTA Games (U20)	Providenciales, Turks and Caicos	3rd	400 m	47.31
2007	Pan American Junior Championships	São Paulo, Brazil	3rd	400 m	46.27
2007	Pan American Junior Championships	São Paulo, Brazil	1st	4 × 400 m relay	3:05.70
2008	Central American and Caribbean Championships	Cali, Colombia	3rd	4 × 400 m relay	3:04.12
2010	NACAC U23 Championships	Miramar, United States	11th (h)	400 m	48.11
2010	NACAC U23 Championships	Miramar, United States	3rd	4 × 400 m relay	3:07.95
2012	Olympic Games	London, United Kingdom	3rd	4 × 400 m relay	2:59.40
2016	World Indoor Championships	Portland, United States	3rd	4 × 400 m relay	3:05.51
