= 2016 IAAF World Indoor Championships =

16th IAAF World Indoor Championships
- Dates: March 17–20
- Host city: Portland, Oregon, United States
- Venue: Oregon Convention Center
- Events: 26 (+2 exhibition)
- Participation: 487 (+12 in exhibition events) athletes from 137 nations

The 16th IAAF World Indoor Championships in Athletics were held between March 17 and 20, 2016 in Portland, Oregon, United States.

The event did not feature Russia. Following a WADA investigation into widespread and institutional doping practices in Russian athletics, the IAAF provisionally suspended Russia's membership of the organisation in November 2015, effectively excluding the country both from hosting events and entering competitions.

Russia's effective exclusion from the tournament was confirmed in November 2015 when it was announced by IAAF that a decision over lifting its provisional suspension from international athletics would not be taken until the end of March at the earliest.

== Bidding process ==
Portland was selected unanimously with the only other bidder being 2003 host Birmingham, England. Birmingham was ultimately selected as the host of the 2018 IAAF World Indoor Championships. The reason Portland was selected for 2016 and Birmingham being selected in 2018 is that the IAAF wanted more time between events in the UK with London hosting the 2012 Olympics as well as the 2017 World Championships in Athletics along with Cardiff hosting the 2016 IAAF World Half Marathon Championships.

== Venue ==
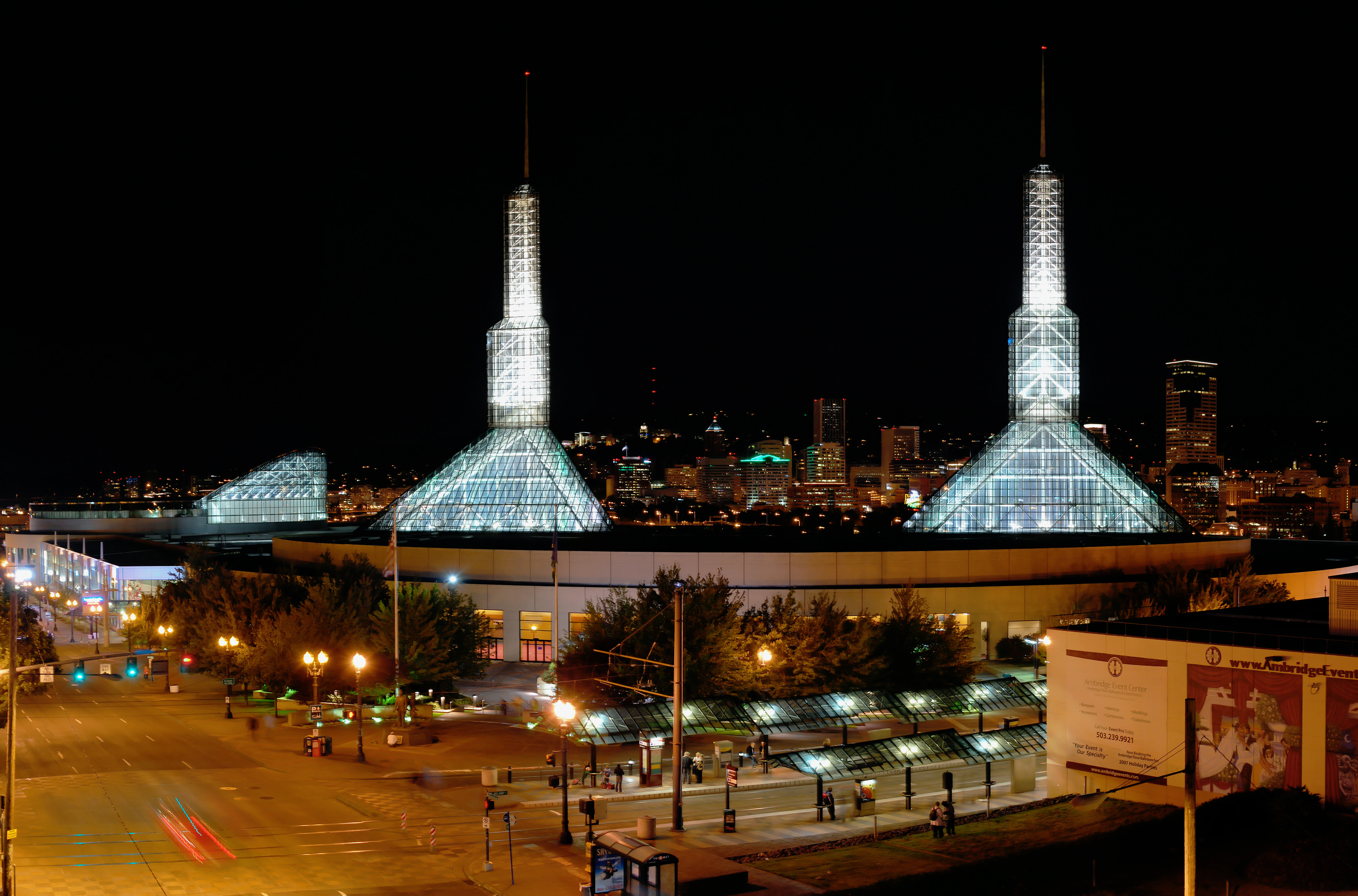
Oregon Convention Center in 2007

The event took place inside the Oregon Convention Center, fitted with the necessary 200m track and seating for 8,000 spectators. A concept drawing of the plans were released in early 2015, showing a two toned track colored (Oregon) green, with trees adorning the peristyle of the indoor arena.

== Schedule ==
H	Heats	½	Semifinals	F	Final
M = morning session, A = afternoon session

All dates are PDT (UTC-7)

Men
Date →	17 March	18 March			19 March		20 March	
Event ↓	A	M	A		M	A	M	
60 m		H	1/2	F				
400 m		H	1/2			F		
800 m		H				F		
1500 m			H				F	
3000 m		H					F	
60 m hurdles						H	1/2	F
4 × 400 m					H		F	
High jump						F		
Pole vault	F							
Long jump							F	
Triple jump						F		
Shot put			F					
Heptathlon		F						

Women
Date →	17 March	18 March			19 March			20 March
Event ↓	A	M	A		M	A		M
60 m					H	1/2	F	
400 m		H	1/2			F		
800 m					H			F
1500 m		H				F		
3000 m								F
60 m hurdles			H	F				
4 × 400 m								F
High jump								F
Pole vault	F							
Long jump			F					
Triple jump					F			
Shot put						F		
Pentathlon		F						

== Medal summary ==
=== Men ===
Event	Gold		Silver		Bronze	
60 metres	Trayvon Bromell; United States	6.47 PB	Asafa Powell; Jamaica	6.50	Ramon Gittens; Barbados	6.51 NR
400 metres	Pavel Maslák; Czech Republic	45.44	Abdelalelah Haroun; Qatar	45.59 SB	Deon Lendore; Trinidad and Tobago	46.17
800 metres	Boris Berian; United States	1:45.83 SB	Antoine Gakeme; Burundi	1:46.65 SB	Erik Sowinski; United States	1:47.22
1500 metres	Matthew Centrowitz; United States	3:44.22	Jakub Holuša; Czech Republic	3:44.30	Nick Willis; New Zealand	3:44.37
3000 metres	Yomif Kejelcha; Ethiopia	7:57.21	Ryan Hill; United States	7:57.39	Augustine Kiprono Choge; Kenya	7:57.43
60 metres hurdles	Omar McLeod; Jamaica	7.41 WL	Pascal Martinot-Lagarde; France	7.46 SB	Dimitri Bascou; France	7.48
4 × 400 metres relay	United States; Kyle Clemons; Calvin Smith; Christopher Giesting; Vernon Norwood; Elvyonn Bailey*; Patrick Feeney*	3:02.45 WL	Bahamas; Michael Mathieu; Alonzo Russell; Shavez Hart; Chris Brown; Ashley Riley*	3:04.75 NR	Trinidad and Tobago; Jarrin Solomon; Lalonde Gordon; Ade Alleyne-Forte; Deon Lendore; Rondel Sorrillo*; Machel Cedenio*	3:05.51 NR
High jump	Gianmarco Tamberi; Italy	2.36 m	Robert Grabarz; Great Britain	2.33 m SB	Erik Kynard; United States	2.33 m SB
Pole vault	Renaud Lavillenie; France	6.02 m CR	Sam Kendricks; United States	5.80 m	Piotr Lisek; Poland	5.75 m
Long jump	Marquis Dendy; United States	8.26 m	Fabrice Lapierre; Australia	8.25 m AR	Changzhou Huang; China	8.21 m PB
Triple jump	Dong Bin; China	17.33 m	Max Hess; Germany	17.14 m PB	Benjamin Compaoré; France	17.09 m SB
Shot put	Tomas Walsh; New Zealand	21.78 m WL, AR	Andrei Gag; Romania	20.89 m SB	Filip Mihaljević; Croatia	20.87 m PB
Heptathlon	Ashton Eaton; United States	6470 pts WL	Oleksiy Kasyanov; Ukraine	6182 pts SB	Mathias Brugger; Germany	6126 pts PB

==== Exhibition event ====
Event	Gold		Silver		Bronze	
800 metres masters	David Roy Wilcox; Great Britain	2:15.90	Joe Gough; Ireland	2:16.01	Oleksandr Lysenko; Ukraine	2:17.38

=== Women ===
Event	Gold		Silver		Bronze	
60 metres	Barbara Pierre; United States	7.02	Dafne Schippers; Netherlands	7.04	Elaine Thompson; Jamaica	7.06
400 metres	Kemi Adekoya; Bahrain	51.45	Ashley Spencer; United States	51.72	Quanera Hayes; United States	51.76
800 metres	Francine Niyonsaba; Burundi	2:00.01 WL	Ajee' Wilson; United States	2:00.27	Margaret Wambui; Kenya	2:00.44 PB
1500 metres	Sifan Hassan; Netherlands	4:04.96	Dawit Seyaum; Ethiopia	4:05.30	Gudaf Tsegay; Ethiopia	4:05.71
3000 metres	Genzebe Dibaba; Ethiopia	8:47.43	Meseret Defar; Ethiopia	8:54.26	Shannon Rowbury; United States	8:55.55
60 metres hurdles	Nia Ali; United States	7.80 SB	Brianna Rollins; United States	7.82	Tiffany Porter; Great Britain	7.90
4 × 400 metres relay	United States; Natasha Hastings; Quanera Hayes; Courtney Okolo; Ashley Spencer	3:26.38 WL	Poland; Ewelina Ptak; Małgorzata Hołub; Magdalena Gorzkowska; Justyna Święty	3:31.15 SB	Romania; Adelina Pastor; Elena Mirela Lavric; Andrea Miklós; Bianca Răzor	3:31.51 SB
High jump	Vashti Cunningham; United States	1.96 m	Ruth Beitia; Spain	1.96 m	Kamila Lićwinko; Poland	1.96 m
Pole vault	Jenn Suhr; United States	4.90 m CR	Sandi Morris; United States	4.85 m	Katerina Stefanidi; Greece	4.80 m
Long jump	Brittney Reese; United States	7.22 m WL	Ivana Španović; Serbia	7.07 m NR	Lorraine Ugen; Great Britain	6.93 m NR
Triple jump	Yulimar Rojas; Venezuela	14.41 m	Kristin Gierisch; Germany	14.30 m SB	Paraskevi Papachristou; Greece	14.15 m
Shot put	Michelle Carter; United States	20.21 m WL	Anita Márton; Hungary	19.33 m NR	Valerie Adams; New Zealand	19.25 m
Pentathlon	Brianne Theisen-Eaton; Canada	4881 pts AR	Alina Fyodorova; Ukraine	4770 pts PB	Barbara Nwaba; United States	4661 pts PB

==== Exhibition event ====
Event	Gold		Silver		Bronze	
800 metres masters	Helene Marie Douay; France	2:37.30	Lesley Chaplin; United States	2:37.57	Karen Brooks; Great Britain	2:40.14

== Medal table ==
The host country is highlighted in lavender blue

Rank	Nation	Gold	Silver	Bronze	Total
1	United States (USA)*	13	6	5	24
2	Ethiopia (ETH)	2	2	1	5
3	France (FRA)	1	1	2	4
4	Jamaica (JAM)	1	1	1	3
5	Burundi (BDI)	1	1	0	2
5	Czech Republic (CZE)	1	1	0	2
5	Netherlands (NED)	1	1	0	2
8	New Zealand (NZL)	1	0	2	3
9	China (CHN)	1	0	1	2
10	Bahrain (BHR)	1	0	0	1
10	Canada (CAN)	1	0	0	1
10	Italy (ITA)	1	0	0	1
10	Venezuela (VEN)	1	0	0	1
14	Germany (GER)	0	2	1	3
15	Ukraine (UKR)	0	2	0	2
16	Great Britain (GBR)	0	1	2	3
16	Poland (POL)	0	1	2	3
18	Romania (ROU)	0	1	1	2
19	Australia (AUS)	0	1	0	1
19	Bahamas (BAH)	0	1	0	1
19	Hungary (HUN)	0	1	0	1
19	Qatar (QAT)	0	1	0	1
19	Serbia (SRB)	0	1	0	1
19	Spain (ESP)	0	1	0	1
25	Greece (GRE)	0	0	2	2
25	Kenya (KEN)	0	0	2	2
25	Trinidad and Tobago (TRI)	0	0	2	2
28	Barbados (BAR)	0	0	1	1
28	Croatia (CRO)	0	0	1	1
Totals (29 entries)		26	26	26	78

== Records ==
=== Men ===
Athlete	Nation	Event	Performance	Type
Renaud Lavillenie	France	Pole vault	6.02 m	CR
Su Bingtian	China	60 metres	6.50	AR
Tomas Walsh	New Zealand	Shot put	21.78 m	AR
Darlan Romani	Brazil	Shot put	18.50 m	NR
Asafa Powell; Ramon Gittens; Shaun Gill	Jamaica; Barbados; Belize	60 metres	6.44; 6.51; 6.99	NR
Wais Ibrahim Khairandesh	Afghanistan	800 metres	1:57.36	NR

=== Women ===
Athlete	Nation	Event	Performance	Type
Jenn Suhr	United States	Pole vault	4.90 m	CR
Brianne Theisen-Eaton	Canada	Pentathlon	4881	AR
Oluwakemi Adekoya	Bahrain	400 m	51.45	AR
Ivana Španović; Lorraine Ugen	Serbia; Great Britain	Long jump	7.07; 6.93	NR
Anita Márton	Hungary	Shot put	19.33	NR
Michelle-Lee Ahye; Ángela Tenorio; Kariman Abuljadayel	Trinidad and Tobago; Ecuador; Saudi Arabia	60 m	7.09; 7.21; 9.48	NR
Andrea Ivančević	Croatia	60 m Hurdles	7.91	NR
Kabange Mupopo; Djénébou Danté; Christina Francisco	Zambia; Mali; Guam	400 m	52.68; 55.76; 1:00.08	NR
Francine Niyonsaba	Burundi	800 m	2.02.37	NR
Beatha Nishimwe; Tamara Armoush	Rwanda; Jordan	1500 m	4:19.39; 4:37.61	NR
Lissa Labiche	Seychelles	High jump	1.89	NR

== Participating nations ==
In brackets the number of athletes participating.

- Afghanistan (1)
- Albania (1)
- Andorra (1)
- American Samoa (1)
- Antigua and Barbuda (2)
- Argentina (1)
- Armenia (1)
- Aruba (1)
- Australia (7)
- Austria (1)
- Azerbaijan (1)
- Bahamas (10)
- Bahrain (1)
- Barbados (3)
- Belarus (6)
- Belgium (4)
- Belize (1)
- Brazil (10)
- British Virgin Islands (2)
- Bulgaria (1)
- Burkina Faso (1)
- Burundi (2)
- Canada (14)
- Cayman Islands (1)
- Chile (1)
- China (12)
- Chinese Taipei (1)
- Comoros (1)
- Cook Islands (1)
- Costa Rica (1)
- Croatia (2)
- Cuba (3)
- Cyprus (1)
- Czech Republic (10)
- Democratic Republic of the Congo (1)
- Dominica (1)
- Dominican Republic (2)
- Denmark (1)
- Djibouti (2)
- Ecuador (1)
- Egypt (1)
- Estonia (2)
- Ethiopia (12)
- Finland (2)
- France (10)
- French Polynesia (1)
- Germany (14)
- Ghana (2)
- Great Britain (23)
- Greece (6)
- Grenada (3)
- Guam (1)
- Guinea (1)
- Guyana (1)
- Haiti (1)
- Honduras (1)
- Hong Kong (1)
- Hungary (6)
- Iceland (1)
- India (1)
- Indonesia (1)
- Ireland (1)
- Italy (5)
- Ivory Coast (3)
- Jamaica (19)
- Japan (4)
- Jordan (1)
- Kazakhstan (2)
- Kenya (12)
- Kyrgyzstan (1)
- Latvia (1)
- Lebanon (1)
- Liberia (1)
- Lithuania (1)
- Luxembourg (1)
- Macau (1)
- Macedonia (1)
- Madagascar (1)
- Mali (1)
- Malta (1)
- Marshall Islands (1)
- Mauritius (1)
- Monaco (1)
- Mongolia (1)
- Montserrat (1)
- Morocco (4)
- Namibia (1)
- Netherlands (8)
- New Zealand (5)
- Nicaragua (1)
- Nigeria (10)
- Northern Mariana Islands (1)
- Norway (1)
- Pakistan (1)
- Palau (1)
- Panama (1)
- Papua New Guinea (1)
- Paraguay (1)
- Peru (1)
- Philippines (1)
- Poland (15)
- Portugal (4)
- Puerto Rico (1)
- Qatar (3)
- Republic of the Congo (1)
- Romania (10)
- Rwanda (1)
- Saint Kitts and Nevis (2)
- Saint Lucia (2)
- El Salvador (1)
- Samoa (1)
- Saudi Arabia (2)
- Senegal (1)
- Serbia (1)
- Seychelles (1)
- Sierra Leone (1)
- Slovakia (2)
- Slovenia (3)
- South Africa (6)
- Spain (15)
- Sri Lanka (1)
- Swaziland (1)
- Sweden (8)
- Switzerland (2)
- Tonga (1)
- Trinidad and Tobago (11)
- Turkey (2)
- Turkmenistan (1)
- Turks and Caicos Islands (1)
- Ukraine (13)
- United Arab Emirates (1)
- United States (57)
- United States Virgin Islands (2)
- Uruguay (1)
- Venezuela (2)
- Zambia (2)
- Zimbabwe (1)
