= Kyle Clemons =

American track and field sprinter

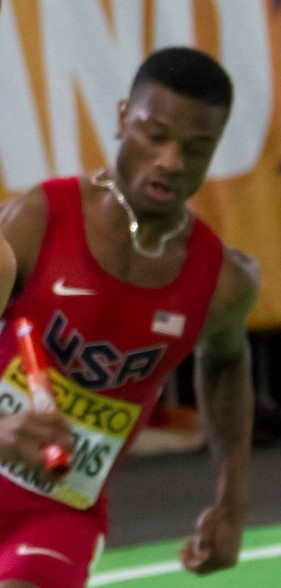
- Clemons at the 2016 World Indoor Championships

Personal information
- Born: December 27, 1990 (age 35) Jonesboro, Arkansas, U.S.
- Home town: Rowlett, Texas, U.S.
- Height: 5 ft 11 in (180 cm)

Sport
- Sport: Track and field
Medal record
Representing United States
Olympic Games
Gold medal – first place	2016 Rio de Janeiro	4 × 400 m relay
World Championships
Gold medal – first place	2015 Beijing	4 × 400 m relay
Pan American Games
Bronze medal – third place	2015 Toronto	400 m
World Indoor Championships
Gold medal – first place	2014 Sopot	4 × 400 m relay
Gold medal – first place	2016 Portland	4 × 400 m relay
Bronze medal – third place	2014 Sopot	400 m

Kyle Clemons (born December 27, 1990) is an American track and field sprinter who competed collegiately for the Kansas Jayhawks and specializes in the 400-meter dash. He was the 2014 champion at the USA Indoor Track and Field Championships and won a bronze medal at the 2014 IAAF World Indoor Championships. His personal best for the event is 44.79.

He competed collegiately for the University of Kansas and broke the indoor and outdoor school records for the 400 m. He was a two-time Big 12 Conference champion in 2013.

== Biography ==
=== Early life and college ===
Born in Jonesboro, Arkansas to Tim Clemons and Valarie Hilson, he grew up in a family with a history of track and field – his mother competed in track for Arkansas State University. He attended Rowlett High School and had his first regional track competitions there, winning state high school titles twice in the 400 m and twice in the 4 × 100-meter relay. He left high school with a personal record of 46.35 seconds for the 400 m. After graduation, he went to the University of Kansas to study for a degree in African and African-American studies.

In his first season of competition for the Kansas Jayhawks collegiate team, he won at the Kansas Relays and achieved a personal record of 45.98 seconds at the NCAA qualifier meet. He came sixth at the Big 12 Conference championship and was a semi-finalist at the NCAA Men's Outdoor Track and Field Championship, where he also competed with the 4 × 400-meter relay team. In addition to this he entered the senior national event and was a semi-finalist at the 2010 USA Outdoor Track and Field Championships. His second year did not see much improvement. He again won at the Kansas Relays, but was out of the top three at the Big 12 Conference indoor and outdoor meets and his season's best of 46.11 seconds saw him eliminated in the first round of the NCAA Outdoor Championship.

Clemons came ninth at the 2012 Big 12 Conference Indoor Championship, but had greater success outdoors. He ran a personal best of 45.91 seconds to take third in the 400 m at the Big 12 outdoor meet and also came fourth in the 4 × 400 m relay, helping set the second fastest time ever for the school at 3:04.89 minutes. Another personal record of 45.44 seconds at the NCAA Outdoors (where he came eleventh) brought him to second on the all-time school lists. He entered the 2012 United States Olympic Trials but did not get past the first round. In his fourth and final year at Kansas, he broke Deon Hogan's long-standing school records from the early 1980s with an indoor best of 46.44 seconds and an outdoor best of 45.10 seconds. At the Big 12 indoor meet he came third in the 400 m and second in the 4 × 400 m relay. He bettered this at the Big 12 outdoors, winning both individual and relay titles, running alongside DeMario Johnson, Michael Stigler, and Kenneth McCuin. He was a semi-finalist in both events at the NCAA Outdoor Championship.

=== Professional ===
In his first professional season in 2014, he won his first national title at the USA Indoor Track and Field Championships, beating the more experienced David Verburg to become the USA 400 m champion with an indoor personal record of 45.60 seconds. This performance led to his selection for the 2014 IAAF World Indoor Championships. At the event, his first major championship, he was the second fastest in qualifying for the final then finished third in the final, taking the bronze medal.

== Personal records ==
Outdoor

- 200-meter dash – 21.09 (2013)
- 400-meter dash – 44.79 (2016)

Indoor

- 60-meter dash – 6.87 (2010)
- 200-meter dash – 21.47 (2014)
- 400-meter dash – 45.60 (2014)

== Competition record ==
Year	Competition	Venue	Position	Event	Notes
2014	World Indoor Championships	Sopot, Poland	3rd	400 metres	45.74
2015	World Championships	Beijing, China	1st^{1}	4 × 400 m relay	2:58.13^{1}
2016	Olympic Games	Rio de Janeiro, Brazil	2nd (h)	4 × 400 m relay	2:58.38
2017	IAAF World Relays	Nassau, Bahamas	1st	4 × 400 m relay	3:02.13

^{1}: Competed only in the heat.

National titles

- USA Indoor Track and Field Championships: 400 m (2014)
