= Ricky Babineaux =

American sprinter (born 1990)

Personal information
- Born: December 14, 1990 (age 35)

Sport
- Country: United States
- Sport: Athletics
- Events: 400 m, 400 m hurdles, 4 × 400 m relay
- College team: Texas A&M Aggies

Achievements and titles
- Personal bests: 400 m: 46.16 (2016); 400 m hurdles: 48.88 (2016)
Medal record
World Indoor Championships
Gold medal – first place	2014 Sopot	4 × 400 m relay

Ricky Babineaux (born December 14, 1990) is an American male former track and field sprinter who specialized in the 400-meter dash, in which he has a personal record of 46.16 seconds. He was a gold medallist in the 4 × 400-meter relay at the 2014 IAAF World Indoor Championships, running for the United States in the heats to top the qualifiers with a time of 3:04.36 minutes alongside Clayton Parros, Kind Butler III, and Calvin Smith Jr.

From Breaux Bridge, Louisiana, Babineaux attended Breaux Bridge High School and took up track and field while there, excelling in sprinting and triple jump. He went on to study at Hinds Community College in Raymond, Mississippi, where he placed third in the 400 m at the NJCAA Championships and was top three in both relays in 2011. He transferred to Texas A&M University after that performance. Competing for the Texas A&M Aggies he won four Southeastern Conference titles with his collegiate team in the 4 × 400 m relay in 2012 and 2013, as well as a 4 × 100-meter relay. He set an indoor 400 m best of 46.37 seconds in 2013, which ranked him 23rd in the world for that season.

He made his national debut at the 2014 USA Indoor Track and Field Championships, where he finished seventh in the 400 m final. He did not compete in 2015 but returned to run at the 2016 United States Olympic Trials, this time competing in the 400-meter hurdles. He trained under multiple Olympic champion Carl Lewis at the University of Houston and relied on the general public to fund his appearance at the national trials. He ran a lifetime best of 48.88 seconds in the final, but was edged into fourth place (and out of the national team) by Olympic medalist Michael Tinsley by six hundredths of a second. He ran sparingly in 2017 and retired from the sport thereafter.

== International competitions ==
Year	Competition	Venue	Position	Event	Notes
2014	World Indoor Championships	Sopot, Poland	1st	4 × 400 metres relay	3:04.36 (heats)
