= 2014 USA Indoor Track and Field Championships =

- Dates: February 21–23
- Host city: Albuquerque, New Mexico, United States
- Venue: Albuquerque Convention Center
- Level: Senior
- Type: Indoor
- Events: 26 (men: 13; women: 13)

The 2014 USA Indoor Track and Field Championships was held at Albuquerque Convention Center in Albuquerque, New Mexico. Organized by USA Track and Field (USATF), the three-day competition took place February 21–23 in conjunction with the USA Indoor Combined Events Championships which started the day after and served as the national championships in track and field for the United States.

The results of the event determined qualification for the 2014 IAAF World Indoor Championships to be held in Sopot, Poland between 7–9 March 2014 provided the athlete achieved (or will achieve before the cut-off date) the World Championships "A" or "B" standard, the top three athletes can gain a place on the World Championships team in an individual event (although only two can compete). Reigning world champions or Diamond League champions (in events where there is no reigning world champion) received a wild card entry to the World Championships, and they did not count against the maximum number of three athletes per event.

Two championship records were set during the competition: Ryan Whiting broke the men's shot put mark with his winning throw of 22.23 m (72 ft 11 in), while Sharon Day won the women's pentathlon with a score of 4805 points, which was also an outright national record for the event.

The women's 3000-meter run attracted the most attention within the competition. Gabe Grunewald, who had previously been diagnosed with cancer, won the race by several seconds to take her first national title. A clash between Grunewald and Jordan Hasay (the fourth placer) in the final lap was originally disregarded by the judges. Alberto Salazar, the coach of Hasay and runner-up Shannon Rowbury, filed a protest which was overruled by the track referee, then a subsequent appeal of that decision was again dismissed. Grunewald's coach, Dennis Barker, stated that Nike staff and Salazar continued to apply pressure on the USATF officials, which resulted in the reopening of the appeal and the disqualification of Grunewald hours after the race (in contravention of USATF's own appeal rules). This provoked severe criticism from present athletes and coaches, as well as track and field journalists and fans on social media. As a result, USATF CEO Max Siegel opened discussions with Barker and Salazar which resulted in the withdrawal of Hasay and Grunewald being reinstated as champion on February 24. The affair generated negative publicity for both USATF and Nike, a company whose sponsorship accounted for nearly half the governing body's budget in 2012.

== Medal summary ==
=== Men ===
Event	Gold		Silver		Bronze	
60 meters	Marvin Bracy	6.48	Trell Kimmons	6.49	Joe Morris	6.52
400 meters	Kyle Clemons	45.60	David Verburg	45.62	Kind Butler III	45.84
800 meters	Erik Sowinski	1:47.86	Robby Andrews	1:48.44	Nick Symmonds	1:48.48
1500 meters	Lopez Lomong	3:43.09	Will Leer	3:43.21	Garrett Heath	3:43.97
3000 meters	Bernard Lagat	7:46.01	Galen Rupp	7:48.19	Ryan Hill	7:49.62
60 meters hurdles	Omoghan Osaghae	7.553	Dominic Berger	7.556	Terrence Trammell	7.559
High jump	Erik Kynard	2.30 m (7 ft 6 1/2 in)	Darius Purcell	2.27 m (7 ft 5 1/4 in)	Dusty Jonas	2.27 m (7 ft 5 1/4 in)
Pole vault	Mark Hollis	5.55 m (18 ft 2 1/2 in)	Shawn Francis	5.55 m (18 ft 2 1/2 in)	Nick Frawley	5.55 m (18 ft 2 1/2 in)
Long jump	Tyron Stewart	8.22 m (26 ft 11 1/2 in)	Chris Benard	8.08 m (26 ft 6 in)	Jeremy Hicks	8.06 m (26 ft 5 1/4 in)
Triple jump	Chris Carter	17.15 m (56 ft 3 in)	Chris Benard	16.99 m (55 ft 8 3/4 in)	Troy Doris	16.84 m (55 ft 2 3/4 in)
Shot put	Ryan Whiting	22.23 m (72 ft 11 in) CR	Kurt Roberts	21.50 m (70 ft 6 1/4 in)	Joe Kovacs	21.46 m (70 ft 4 3/4 in)
Weight throw	A. G. Kruger	23.70 m (77 ft 9 in)	J. C. Lambert	23.05 m (75 ft 7 1/4 in)	Jake Freeman	22.80 m (74 ft 9 1/2 in)
Heptathlon	Gray Horn	6071 pts	Jeff Mohl	5746 pts	Daniel Gooris	5613 pts

=== Women ===
Event	Gold		Silver		Bronze	
60 meters	Tianna Bartoletta	7.08	LaKeisha Lawson	7.09	Barbara Pierre	7.10
400 meters	Francena McCorory	50.85	Joanna Atkins	51.13	Natasha Hastings	51.34
800 meters	Ajee' Wilson	2:00.43	Chanelle Price	2:00.48	Molly Beckwith	2:01.87
1500 meters	Mary Cain	4:07.05	Treniere Moser	4:09.93	Heather Kampf	4:13.04
3000 meters	Gabe Grunewald	9:23.15	Shannon Rowbury	9:25.49	Sara Vaughn	9:26.46
60 meters hurdles	Nia Ali	7.80	Janay DeLoach Soukup	7.82	Kristi Castlin	7.88
High jump	Inika McPherson	1.91 m (6 ft 3 in)	Tiana Wills	1.88 m (6 ft 2 in)	Megan Glisar	1.85 m (6 ft 3/4 in)
Pole vault	Mary Saxer	4.71 m (15 ft 5 1/4 in)	Jenn Suhr	4.66 m (15 ft 3 1/4 in)	Kylie Hutson	4.66 m (15 ft 3 1/4 in)
Long jump	Tori Polk	6.70 m (21 ft 11 3/4 in)	Tori Bowie	6.66 m (21 ft 10 in)	Andrea Geubelle	6.61 m (21 ft 8 in)
Triple jump	Amanda Smock	13.81 m (45 ft 3 1/2 in)	Andrea Geubelle	13.66 m (44 ft 9 3/4 in)	Toni Smith	13.57 m (44 ft 6 1/4 in)
Shot put	Michelle Carter	18.45 m (60 ft 6 1/4 in)	Jeneva McCall	18.28 m (59 ft 11 1/2 in)	Felisha Johnson	17.94 m (58 ft 10 1/4 in)
Weight throw	Gwen Berry	23.82 m (78 ft 1 3/4 in)	Amber Campbell	23.68 m (77 ft 8 1/4 in)	Jeneva McCall	23.16 m (75 ft 11 3/4 in)
Pentathlon	Sharon Day-Monroe	4805 pts NR CR	Sami Spenner	4498 pts	Barbara Nwaba	4406 pts
