= Babineaux =

Babineaux (/bæbɪnoʊ/ Bah-bin-no) may refer to:

- Jonathan Babineaux, a former American football defensive tackle
- Briana Babineaux, an American urban contemporary gospel artist
- Jordan Babineaux, a former American football safety
- Kathleen Babineaux Blanco, the 54th Governor of Louisiana
- Ricky Babineaux, an American male former track and field sprinter
- Huell Babineaux, a fictional character in Breaking Bad and Better Call Saul
- Clive Babineaux, a character in iZombie
