= Saddam Hussain =

Saddam Hussain, or variants, may refer to:

- Saddam Hussein (1937–2006), Former Iraqi president
- Saddam Hussain Pavel (born 1975), Bangladeshi politician
- Saddam Hussain (footballer) (born 1993), Pakistani football player
- Saddam Hussain (athlete) (born 1995), Pakistani runner: Missing in 2014, returned to competition in 2017.
- Saddam Hossain (cricketer) (born 1995), Bangladeshi cricketer
- Saddam Hussain (Chhatra League), Bangladeshi politician
- Saddam Hosein, Trinidad and Tobago politician
