= Andrew Osagie =

British middle-distance runner

Personal information
- Nationality: British (English)
- Born: 19 February 1988 (age 38) Harlow, Essex, England
- Height: 189 cm (6 ft 2 in)
- Weight: 72 kg (159 lb)

Sport
- Sport: Athletics
- Event: middle-distance
- Club: Harlow AC
Medal record
Men's athletics
Representing Great Britain
World Indoor Championships
Bronze medal – third place	2012 Istanbul	800 m
Bronze medal – third place	2014 Sopot	800 m
European Team Championships
Bronze medal – third place	2013 Gateshead	800 m
2012 IAAF Diamond League
Bronze medal – third place	2012 Doha	800 m
Bronze medal – third place	2012 Rome	800 m
Bronze medal – third place	2012 New York	800 m
Bronze medal – third place	2012 London	800 m
2013 IAAF Diamond League
Silver medal – second place	2013 New York	800 m
Bronze medal – third place	2013 Birmingham	800 m

Andrew Ifeanyichukwu Osagie (born 19 February 1988) is an English athlete who specialised in the 800 metres and appeared at the 2012 Summer Olympics.

== Biography ==
While attending St Mary's University College he made rapid progress to win his first national titles and international medals. Osagie has performed well indoors, winning bronze medals at the IAAF World Indoor Championships in 2012 and 2014, as well as ranking second on the British Indoor All-Time list. He represented Harlow Athletic Club at club level.

Osagie was twice British 800 metres champion after winning the British Athletics Championships in 2011 and 2012.

In the men's 800 metres final at the 2012 Olympic Games in London, he finished eighth in a time of 1:43.77. This time would have won gold in all but two other Olympic Games, but the winner David Rudisha set a world record and the remaining medallists set the fastest time for place in the event. The summer outdoor season of 2013 saw a 5th-place finish in the 2013 World Championships in Athletics.

He is the fourth fastest Briton of all time.

== Competition record ==
Year	Competition	Venue	Position	Event	Notes
Representing Great Britain and England
2009	European U23 Championships	Kaunas, Lithuania	7th (h)	800 m	1:49.47
2010	World Indoor Championships	Doha, Qatar	10th (sf)	800 m	1:51.29
2010	Commonwealth Games	Delhi, India	9th (sf)	800 m	1:47.52
2011	European Indoor Championships	Paris, France	4th	800 m	1:48.50
2011	World Championships	Daegu, South Korea	13th (sf)	800 m	1:46.12
2012	World Indoor Championships	Istanbul, Turkey	3rd	800 m	1:48.92
2012	Olympic Games	London, United Kingdom	8th	800 m	1:43.77
2013	World Championships	Moscow, Russia	5th	800 m	1:44.36
2014	World Indoor Championships	Sopot, Poland	3rd	800 m	1:47.10
2014	Commonwealth Games	Glasgow, United Kingdom	–	800 m	DQ
2014	European Championships	Zürich, Switzerland	17th (h)	800 m	1:48.31
2018	Commonwealth Games	Gold Coast, Australia	14th (h)	800 m	1:48.19

== Personal bests ==
Outdoor

- 200m - 23.3 (St Ives 2009)
- 400m - 47.69 (Watford 2017)
- 600m - 1:20.7 (Loughborough 2008)
- 800m - 1:43.77 (London 2012 2012)
- 1000m - 2:17.18 (Stockholm 2018)
- 1500m - 3:48.99 (Watford 2009)
- 1 Mile - 4:10 (Gateshead 2011)
- Parkrun - 16:44 (Bushy Park 2016)
- TJ - 13.01 (Colchester 2004)

Indoor

- 600m - 1:16.45 (Glasgow 2013)
- 800m - 1:45.22 (Birmingham 2014)
- 1000m - 2:18.56 (Birmingham 2011)
