= Tenirberdi Suiunbaev =

Kyrgyzstani middle-distance runner

Personal information
- Nationality: Kyrgyzstani
- Born: 5 September 1994 (age 31)

Sport
- Sport: Track and field
- Event: 800m

Tenirberdi Suiunbaev (born 5 September 1994) is a Kyrgyzstani middle-distance runner. He competed in the 800 metres event at the 2014 IAAF World Indoor Championships.
