= Parros =

Parros is a surname. Notable people with the surname include:

- Clayton Parros (born 1990), American track and field athlete
- George Parros (born 1979), American ice hockey player
- Peter Parros (born 1960), American actor and screenwriter
- Rick Parros (born 1958), American football player

== See also ==
- Dave Parro (born 1957), Canadian ice hockey player
