= Kind Butler III =

American sprinter

Medal record

Men's athletics

Representing the United States

World Indoor Championships
Gold medal – first place	2014 Sopot	4 × 400 m relay

Kind Butler III (born April 8, 1989) is an American track and field athlete who competes in the 400 meters. In 2014, along with teammates David Verburg, Kyle Clemons, and Calvin Smith Jr., he helped set a new world record in the 4x400 meter relay at the IAAF World Indoor Championships in Athletics in Sopot, Poland.

== Running career ==
=== High School ===
Butler attended Lawrence Central High School. He primarily played baseball and football in high school only joining the track team with three weeks left in his senior year. He would break the school Long Jump record and clear 6'8 in the high jump. Butler jumped 21'11'½ to finish 5th in the Long Jump at the 2007 IHSAA State track meet.

=== College ===
Butler went to Kentucky State University where he won the SIAC title in the high jump and broke school records in the long jump, high jump and 200 m.

After his freshman year he transferred to Indiana University to be coached by Ron Helmer. While at Indiana he primarily competed in the sprint events. In 2011 he was the Big 10 Indoor 60 m champion. In 2012, as a senior, he was the Big 10 Indoor and outdoor champion in the 200 m.

=== Professional ===
After his senior season at Indiana, Butler competed in the 2012 USA Championships where he immediately was competitive making the semi-finals in both the 200 meters and the 400 meters.

In 2014 he made the Team USA indoor 4 × 400 team and competed at the World Championships in Sopot, Poland. He ran the third leg in 45.41 helping the team win gold and set a new world record of 3:02.13. The team divided a prize purse of $90,000 -- $40,000 for a gold medal and a $50,000 bonus for the world record.

While finishing up his professional career he also worked as an assistant track coach at Marian University from 2013 to 2016.

== Race Result Table ==
Year	Meet	Location	Event	Place	Time
2014	2014 USA Indoor Track and Field Championships	Albuquerque, New Mexico, USA	400 m	3rd	45.84
2014	Sopot IAAF World Indoor Championships	Sopot, Poland	4 × 400 m	1st	3:02.13

== Statistics ==
Personal bests

Event	Time (seconds)	Location	Date
200 metres	20.36	Jacksonville, FL (USA)	26 May 2012
300 metres	32.39	Liège (BEL)	10 Jul 2013
400 metres	45.43	Indianapolis, IN (USA)	16 Jun 2012
