= Medtronic TC 1 Mile =

- Date: May
- Location: Minneapolis/St. Paul, MN
- Event type: Road
- Distance: 1 mile (1.6 km)
- Primary sponsor: Medtronic
- Established: 2010
- Course records: Men: 3:55.8 (2016); Ben Blankenship; Women: 4:30.8 (2011); Sara Hall
- Website: https://www.tcmevents.org/events/medtronic-tc-1-mile-2020/race

The Medtronic TC 1 Mile is a 1 mile road race held in the Twin Cities.

== History ==
The race's inauguration was in 2009, where it served as the USATF 1 Mile Road Championships. It is held as one event in the Twin Cities in Motion race series, which includes the Twin Cities Marathon and the TC 10 Mile. The 1 mile race is run in heats, with gender specific sections for the fastest heats. Other heats are mixed genders based upon seed times. The race has a purse of $15,000, with additional bonuses for breaking 4:00 or for breaking the course record.

== Results ==
Key: Course record USATF 1 Mile Road Championships

| Edition | Year | Men's winner | Time (m:s) | Women's winner | Time (m:s) |
|---|---|---|---|---|---|
| 1 | 2009 | David Torrence (USA) | 3:59.3 | Shannon Rowbury (USA) | 4:33.4 |
| 2 | 2010 | David Torrence (USA) | 4:04.0 | Anna Pierce (USA) | 4:34.6 |
| 3 | 2011 | David Torrence (USA) | 3:58.4 | Sara Hall (USA) | 4:30.8 |
| 4 | 2012 | Craig Miller (USA) | 4:04.3 | Heather Kampf (USA) | 4:36.9 |
| 5 | 2013 | Nick Willis (NZL) | 3:56.1 | Sarah Brown (USA) | 4:33.3 |
| 6 | 2014 | Cancelled due to inclement weather | | | |
| 7 | 2015 | Garrett Heath (USA) | 4:08.3 | Heather Kampf (USA) | 4:45.4 |
| 8 | 2016 | Ben Blankenship (USA) | 3:55.8 | Heather Kampf (USA) | 4:34.2 |
| 9 | 2017 | Ben Blankenship (USA) | 4:01 | Emily Lipari (USA) | 4:35 |
| 10 | 2018 | Sam McEntree (USA) | 4:03.0 | Emily Lipari (USA) | 4:39.8 |
| 11 | 2019 | Joseph Coffey (USA) | 4:17.7 | Melissa Agnew (USA) | 5:12.8 |
| - | 2020 | Cancelled due to COVID-19 pandemic | | | |
| - | 2021 | Cancelled due to COVID-19 pandemic | | | |
