= Jermaine Brown (athlete) =

Jamaican sprinter (born 1991)

Medal record

Men's athletics

Representing Jamaica

IAAF World Relays
Gold medal – first place	2014 Nassau	4×200 m relay

IAAF World Indoor Championships
Bronze medal – third place	2014 Sopot	4×400 m relay

CAC Championships
Silver medal – second place	2013 Morelia	4×100 m relay

Jermaine Brown (born 4 July 1991) is a Jamaican track and field sprinter. He competes in distances from 60 metres to 400 metres. He has a 200 metres best of 20.29 seconds and a 400 m best of 46.24 seconds. He mainly competes internationally in relay competitions.

He is a world record holder for the 4 × 200 metres relay event, having set a time of 1:18.63 minutes with the Jamaican team at the 2014 IAAF World Relays. He was also a bronze medallist in the 4 × 400 metres relay at the 2014 IAAF World Indoor Championships.

== Career ==
He began competing the sprints in his youth and, while studying at Bridgeport High School, he came third in the 200 metres at the Jamaican High School Championships. In his international debut at the 2007 CARIFTA Games he came third in the 100 metres and runner-up in the 200 m, behind compatriot Dexter Lee, setting personal bests of 10.65 seconds and 21.25 seconds in the process. He transferred to Calabar High School in Kingston, Jamaica, but did not compete much from 2008 to 2010, during which time he moved to New York City.

Continuing with his training, he set a series of personal bests in 2011, running 6.77 seconds for the 60 metres, 10.39 seconds for the 100 m, and 20.90 seconds for the 200 m. He brought his bests down further in 2012 (10.26 and 20.72), but did not compete at any major events. He began working with a new coach, Bryn Davis, in 2013 and he pairing delivered results. Brown opened the year with a 60 m best of 6.70 seconds and went on to place sixth in the 200 m at the Jamaican Athletics Championships with a best of 20.49 seconds. This earned him selection for the 2013 Central American and Caribbean Championships in Athletics – his first senior championship – and he was eighth in the final and took silver in the 4×100 metres relay, in a team of Oshane Bailey, Andrew Fisher, and Jason Livermore.

Brown has a strong indoor season in 2014. He ran bests of 5.84 seconds for the 50 metres, 6.62 seconds for the 60 m, then ran a world-leading time of 20.59 seconds. His indoor time of 33.30 seconds for the 300 metres was also a world lead, and a 400 metres run of 46.24 seconds mark yet another best for the athlete. He was chosen as the heat runner for the Jamaican 4×400 metres relay team at the 2014 IAAF World Indoor Championships and, after he qualified the team, they won the bronze medal in the final. In April and May, Brown set outdoor personal records of 20.29 seconds and 46.64 seconds for 200 m and 400 m distance. Given his form, he was again called up to the national team: at the 2014 IAAF World Relays, he was the third leg runner in the 4×200 metres relay. The team in the heats (Rasheed Dwyer, Brown, Livermore, and Warren Weir) set an area record time of 1:20.15 minutes. Brown and Weir were joined by Nickel Ashmeade and Yohan Blake in the final, where they broke the world record for the event, taking the gold medal in 1:18.63 minutes. This improved upon the 20-year-old mark set by the Santa Monica Track Club.

== Personal bests ==
- 50 metres – 5.84 seconds (2014)
- 60 metres – 6.62 seconds (2014)
- 100 metres – 10.26 seconds (2012)
- 200 metres – 20.28 seconds (2014)
- 200 metres (indoor) – 20.59 seconds (2014)
- 300 metres (indoor) – 32.91 seconds (2015)
- 400 metres – 46.64 seconds (2014)
- 400 metres (indoor) – 46.24 seconds (2014)

== International competition record ==
Year	Competition	Venue	Position	Event	Notes
2007	CARIFTA Games (U-17)	Providenciales, Turks and Caicos Islands	3rd	100 metres	10.65 (wind: +1.0 m/s)
2007	CARIFTA Games (U-17)	Providenciales, Turks and Caicos Islands	2nd	200 metres	21.25 (wind: +1.2 m/s)
2013	Central American and Caribbean Championships	Morelia, Mexico	8th	200 metres	20.92 A (wind: +0.5 m/s)
2013	Central American and Caribbean Championships	Morelia, Mexico	2nd	4 × 100 metres relay	38.86 A
2014	World Indoor Championships	Sopot, Poland	3rd	4 × 400 metres relay	3:03.69
2014	IAAF World Relays	Nassau, Bahamas	1st	4 × 200 metres relay	1:18.63 min WR
2014	Pan American Sports Festival	Mexico City, Mexico	3rd	200m	20.28 A (wind: +0.6 m/s)
