= Luke Lennon-Ford =

British sprinter

Personal information
- Nationality: British; Irish
- Born: 5 May 1989 (age 37) Sutton Coldfield, United Kingdom
- Height: 1.83 m (6 ft 0 in)
- Weight: 80 kg (180 lb)

Sport
- Sport: Track and field
- Event: 400 metres
- Club: Birchfield Harriers; Clonliffe Harriers (2017–)
- Coached by: Linford Christie

Achievements and titles
- Personal best: 400 metres 45.23 (Genève 2012)
Medal record
Men's athletics
Representing Great Britain
World Indoor Championships
Silver medal – second place	2012 Istanbul	4×400 m relay
Silver medal – second place	2014 Sopot	4×400 m relay
Bronze medal – third place	2010 Doha	4x400 m relay

Luke Lennon-Ford (born 5 May 1989) is a British born sprinter competing for Ireland who specialises in the 400 metres. He is coached by Linford Christie. Prior to 2017, Lennon-Ford ran for his birthplace, Great Britain

At the 2011 European Athletics U23 Championships he won bronze in the 400 metres and gold in the 4 x 400 metres relay. He was selected in the 2012 Olympic team for the 4 x 400 metre relay,
