= 2014 IAAF World Indoor Championships – Men's 800 metres =

Men's 800 metres at the 2014 IAAF World Indoor Championships
- Venue: Ergo Arena
- Dates: 7 March (heats); 9 March (final)
- Competitors: 19 from 16 nations
- Winning time: 1:46.40

Medalists
gold medal	Mohammed Aman	Ethiopia
silver medal	Adam Kszczot	Poland
bronze medal	Andrew Osagie	Great Britain

The men's 800 metres at the 2014 IAAF World Indoor Championships took place on 7 and 9 March 2014. Poland's Marcin Lewandowski originally won the bronze medal, but a single step on the infield led to his disqualification and the promotion of Great Britain's Andrew Osagie to the third podium position.

== Medalists ==
Gold	Silver	Bronze
Mohammed Aman; Ethiopia	Adam Kszczot; Poland	Andrew Osagie; Great Britain

== Records ==
Standing records prior to the 2014 IAAF World Indoor Championships
World record	Wilson Kipketer (DEN)	1:42.67	Paris, France	9 March 1997
Championship record	Wilson Kipketer (DEN)	1:42.67	Paris, France	9 March 1997
World Leading	Mohammed Aman (ETH)	1:44.52	Birmingham, Great Britain	15 February 2014
African record	Mohammed Aman (ETH)	1:44.52	Birmingham, Great Britain	15 February 2014
Asian record	Yusuf Saad Kamel (BHR)	1:45.26	Valencia, Spain	9 March 2008
European record	Wilson Kipketer (DEN)	1:42.67	Paris, France	9 March 1997
North and Central American and Caribbean record	Johnny Gray (USA)	1:45.00	Sindelfingen, Germany	8 March 1992
Oceanian record	Ryan Foster (AUS)	1:47.48	State College, United States	30 January 2010
South American record	José Luíz Barbosa (BRA)	1:45.43	Piraeus, Greece	8 March 1989

== Qualification standards ==
Indoor	Outdoor
1:47.00	1:44.00

== Schedule ==
Date	Time	Round
7 March 2014	13:30	Heats
9 March 2014	17:20	Final

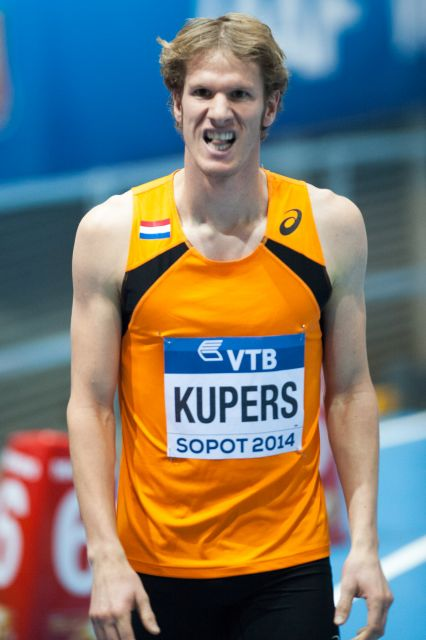
Fifth-place finisher, Thijmen Kupers

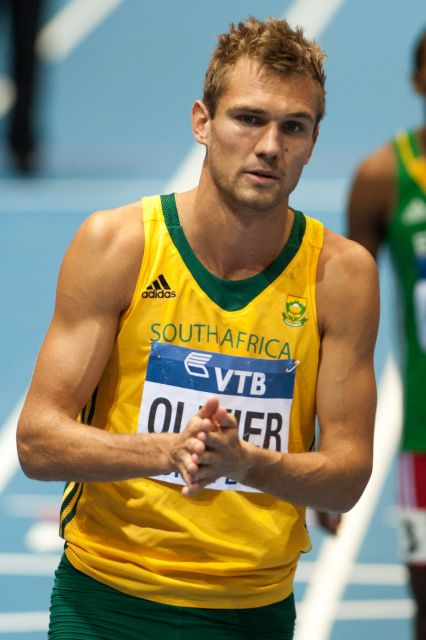
André Olivier finished fourth in the final

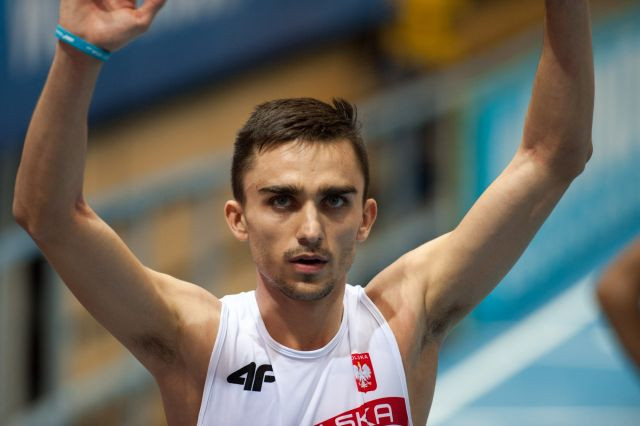
Adam Kszczot took the silver for the host nation

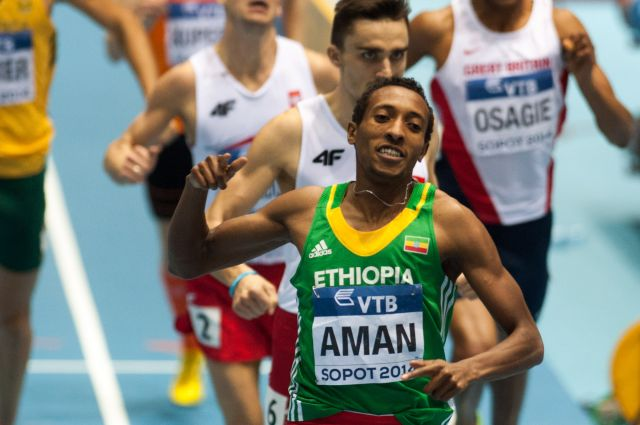
Mohammed Aman finishing first in the final

== Results ==
=== Heats ===
Qualification: The winner of each heat (Q) and next 3 fastest (q) qualified.

Rank	Heat	Lane	Name	Nationality	Time	Notes
1	3	4	Adam Kszczot	Poland	1:45.76	Q
2	3	1	Andrew Osagie	Great Britain	1:45.88	q
3	2	5	André Olivier	South Africa	1:46.18	Q
4	2	1	Marcin Lewandowski	Poland	1:46.26	q
5	2	3	Thijmen Kupers	Netherlands	1:46.55	q, PB
6	1	3	Mohammed Aman	Ethiopia	1:46.73	Q
7	1	2	Stepan Poistogov	Russia	1:47.11	
8	2	6	Nick Symmonds	United States	1:47.29	SB
9	1	1	Kevin López	Spain	1:47.34	
10	3	5	Jeremiah Kipkorir Mutai	Kenya	1:47.41	
11	1	6	Mukhtar Mohammed	Great Britain	1:47.59	SB
12	3	2	Mark English	Ireland	1:47.60	
13	1	7	Erik Sowinski	United States	1:48.04	
14	3	3	Kristinn Thór Kristinsson	Iceland	1:51.20	PB
15	3	6	Brice Etès	Monaco	1:51.24	NR
16	2	2	Farkhod Kuralov	Tajikistan	1:52.36	NR
17	1	5	Tenirberdi Suiunbaev	Kyrgyzstan	2:00.51	PB
	1	4	Saddam Hussain	Pakistan	DQ	R163.3(b)
	2	4	Musaeb Abdulrahman Balla	Qatar	DQ	R163.3(a)

=== Final ===
Rank	Name	Nationality	Time	Notes
1st place, gold medalist(s)	Mohammed Aman	Ethiopia	1:46.40	
2nd place, silver medalist(s)	Adam Kszczot	Poland	1:46.76	
3rd place, bronze medalist(s)	Andrew Osagie	Great Britain	1:47.10	
4	André Olivier	South Africa	1:47.31	
5	Thijmen Kupers	Netherlands	1:47.74	
	Marcin Lewandowski	Poland	DQ	R163.3(b)
