= David Torrence (athlete) =

Peruvian-American middle-distance runner

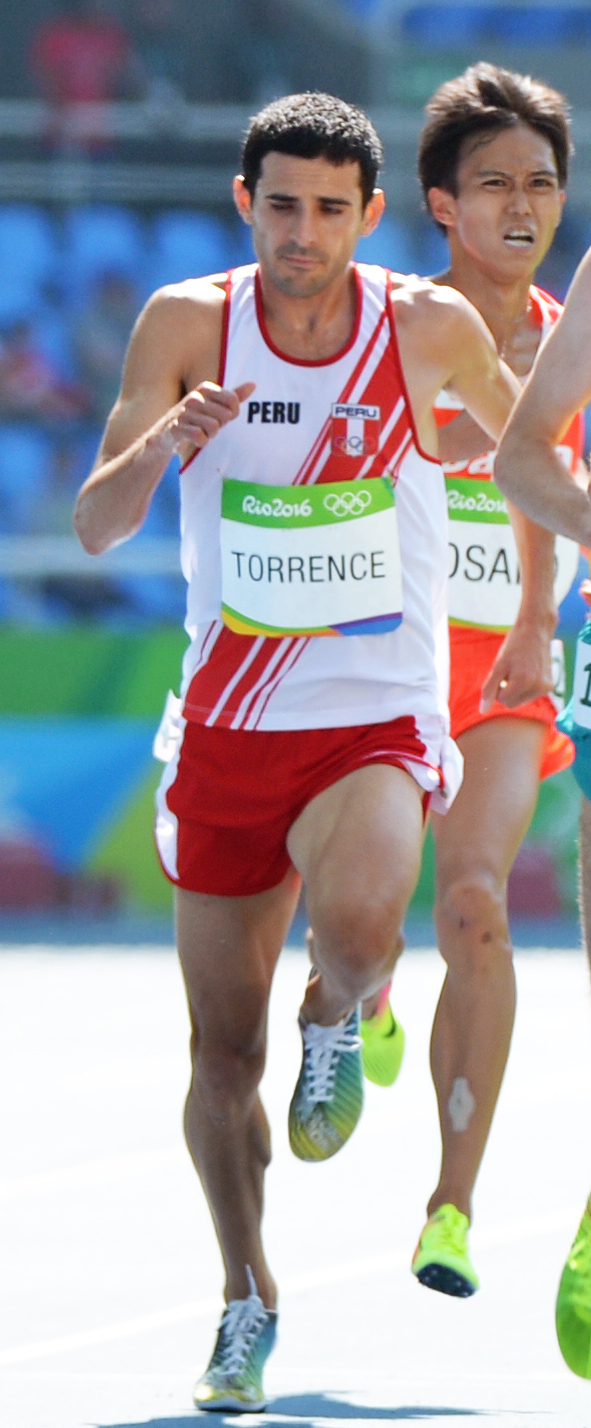
- Torrence at the 2016 Olympics

Personal information
- Nationality: Peru, United States
- Born: November 26, 1985 Okinawa, Japan
- Died: August 28, 2017 (aged 31) Scottsdale, Arizona, United States
- Height: 5 ft 10 in (1.78 m)
- Weight: 135 lb (61 kg)

Sport
- Sport: Athletics
- Event: 800–5000 m
- College team: UC Berkeley
- Turned pro: 2008

Achievements and titles
- Personal best(s): 800m: 1:45.14; 1500m: 3:33.23; Mile: 3:52.01; 3000m: 7:40.78; 5000m: 13:16.53
Medal record
Representing United States
World Relay Championships
Silver medal – second place	2014 Nassau	4 × 1500 m relay
Pan American Games
Silver medal – second place	2015 Toronto	5,000 m
- Updated on June 3, 2016

David Torrence (November 26, 1985 – August 28, 2017) was a Peruvian-American middle-distance runner and indoor American record holder in the 1000 meters (active). Born in Okinawa, Japan, Torrence was raised in Tarzana, California. After graduating from Loyola High School in 2003, he went on to run for the University of California, Berkeley and Hoka One One. Torrence represented Peru at the 2016 Summer Olympics.

== Running career ==
=== High school ===
Torrence ran cross country and track at Loyola High School in Los Angeles. During his junior year, he ran personal bests of 2:01 in the 800m, 4:35 in the 1600m, and 10:01 in the 3200m. He improved significantly during his senior year, improving in all three of those distances and winning state titles. By the end of his senior year, his personal bests had lowered to 1:58 in the 800m, 4:11 in the 1600m, and 9:05 in the 3200m. Also during his senior year, he led his team to a state and CIF cross country title in the fall while placing 3rd in the 1600m at the CIF California State Meet during the outdoor track season. By the end of the year, he ranked in the top ten in the state for both the 1600m and the 3200m.

=== Collegiate ===
In college, Torrence competed for the University of California, Berkeley. In his cross country season in 2003, he placed 44th at the Pac-10 Championships and 73rd at the NCAA West Regional with times of 26:28 and 31:36, respectively. In 2004, he won the National Junior Championships in the 1500m, qualifying for the World Junior Championships. There, he set the UC Berkeley freshman record in the 1500m with a time of 3:43.62. Later on his career, at the Brutus Hamilton Invitational in 2006, he ran a 4:07.55 in the mile. In his final year of cross country at UC Berkeley, he made the All-West Region team, finishing 13th at the West Regional. This qualified him for the NCAA Cross Country Championships in which he placed 92nd out of 250. His final track season at Berkeley was one of success, improving upon his personal bests at multiple distances. He set the mile record for his school with a time of 3:58.62 at the California Collegiate Challenge. At the PAC-10 Championships he set a PB in the 800m with a time of 1:49.87, but would go on to lower his best time in three more events that season: the 1500m at the USA Championships with a time of 3:40.8, the 3000m at the Big Meet with a time of 8:16.63, and the 5000m at the Stanford Invitational with a time of 13:59.65.

=== Professional ===
Success came for Torrence shortly after leaving college. At the 2009 USA Outdoor Track and Field Championships, Torrence finished 17th in a time of 3:42.40. He won the USA Road Mile championships at the Medtronic TC 1 Mile in 2009, and would go on to win it again twice more in the two years after.

2010 USA Outdoor Track and Field Championships, Torrence finished 4th in a tactical 1500 meters in a time of 3:51.80.

At the 2011 USA Outdoor Track and Field Championships, Torrence finished 6th in the 1500 meters in a time of 3:48.31.

In 2012, he won the Falmouth Mile with a time of 3:55.79. Later that year, he set a personal best (that remains as his personal best today) in the mile at the Pre Classic with a 3:52.01, making him the fastest American that year in the mile. At the 2012 United States Trials, Torrence finished sixth in the 1500 meters in a time of 3:37.70.

At the 2013 USA Outdoor Track and Field Championships, Torrence finished seventh in a tactical 1500 meters with a time of 3:46.26. His 2013 season got off to a late start due to an injury but, regardless of this, he was still able to have a relatively successful year, despite Torrence feeling like he could do better. He ultimately set his sights on the American record in the road 5k. He made an attempt at the record that fall at the Silicon Valley Turkey Trot, but he finished with a time of 13:33, 9 seconds shy of the 13:24 record.

Torrence had a record setting indoor season in 2014, setting the American Record for the indoor 1000m, the World Record in the indoor 4x800 and also running under the previous American Record in the 2000m, although Bernard Lagat was able to run even faster that same race and take the record. Torrence split a 3:36 1500 meters in the 4 × 1500 meters at the IAAF World Relays on May 25, 2014, to help United States finish 2nd only to Kenya. At the 2014 USA Outdoor Track and Field Championships, Torrence finished seventeenth in a tactical 1500 meters with a time of 3:45.35. After previously running for Nike, on November 25, 2014, it was announced that he had signed with Hoka One One.

At the 2015 USA Outdoor Track and Field Championships, Torrence finished fifth in a tactical 5000 meters with a time of 13:52.24. A week later, at the Portland Summer Twilight, Torrence took the 800m win over Chad Noelle of Oklahoma State University with a time of 1:48.04 (Noelle went 1:48.06). Torrence won the 2015 national title at the United States 5k road championships.

Year	Competition	Venue	Position	Event	Notes
2015	2015 USA Outdoor Track and Field Championships	Hayward Field, University of Oregon	5th	5000 metres	13:52.24
2014	2014 USA Outdoor Track and Field Championships	Hornet Stadium, California State University, Sacramento	17th	1500 metres	3:45.35
2013	2013 USA Outdoor Track and Field Championships	Drake Stadium Des Moines, Iowa	7th	1500 metres	3:46.26
2012	2012 United States Olympic Trials (track and field)	Hayward Field, University of Oregon	6th	1500 metres	3:37.70
2011	2011 USA Outdoor Track and Field Championships	Hayward Field, University of Oregon	6th	1500 metres	3:48.31
2010	2010 USA Outdoor Track and Field Championships	Drake University Des Moines, Iowa	4th	1500 metres	3:51.80
2009	2009 USA Outdoor Track and Field Championships	Hayward Field, University of Oregon	17th	1500 metres	3:42.40
2008	2008 United States Olympic Trials (track and field)	Hayward Field, University of Oregon	26th	1500 metres	3:45.89
2007	2007 USA Outdoor Track and Field Championships	IU Michael A. Carroll Track & Soccer Stadium Indianapolis	13th	1500 metres	3:40.80
2006	2006 USA Outdoor Track and Field Championships	IU Michael A. Carroll Track & Soccer Stadium Indianapolis	19th	1500 metres	3:47.87

The International Olympic Committee (IOC) confirmed that the athlete David Torrence, an American, was enabled to compete defending Peru in the Rio 2016 Olympic Games, accessing request for a change of nationality as the athlete had requested through the Committee Olympic Peruano – June 2, 2016. Torrence qualified to the final in a national record in 13:23.20 at Athletics at the 2016 Summer Olympics – Men's 5000 metres.

Torrence set the Peru record in the mile run on June 1, 2017, when he won the event at the Massachusetts-based Adrian Martinez Classic in 3 minutes, 53.21 seconds. He broke the 1,500-meter record 17 days later when he ran 3:34.67 to finish eighth at the Stockholm Diamond League meet in Sweden.

== Death ==
Torrence was found dead in a swimming pool in Scottsdale, Arizona, on August 28, 2017, at the age of 31. His death was ruled an accidental drowning.
