= Errol Nolan =

American-Jamaican sprinter (born 1991)

Personal information
- Nationality: American-Jamaican
- Born: August 18, 1991 (age 35) Rosenberg, Texas, U.S.
- Height: 5 ft 10 in (1.78 m)

Sport
- Sport: Track and field
- Events: 200 metres, 400 metres
- College team: Houston Cougars

Achievements and titles
- Personal bests: 200 m: 20.77 s (Orlando 2010); 400 m: 45.25 s (Kingston 2012)
Medal record
Men's athletics
Representing Jamaica
World Indoor Championships
Bronze medal – third place	2014 Sopot	4×400 m relay
Representing United States
World Junior Championships
Gold medal – first place	2010 Moncton	4×400 m relay
Bronze medal – third place	2010 Moncton	400 m

Errol Osbourne Nolan II (born August 18, 1991) is an American-born sprinter of Jamaican descent who holds dual citizenship with both countries. He now competes for Jamaica as of 2012. He specialises in the 200 and 400 metres.

Nolan attended Lamar Consolidated High School until 2009, and later the University of Houston, where in 2010, he was one of the best freshmen in Conference USA.

At the 2010 World Junior Championships in Athletics in Moncton, Canada, Nolan won a bronze medal over 400 metres, and helped the American squad to a gold medal in the 4×400 metres relay. He earned a spot in the Jamaican 4x400 relay team at the 2012 Summer Olympics, however, the Jamaican team did not qualify from their heat.

In 2014, he was part of the Jamaican 4 × 400 m team that won bronze at the World Indoor Athletics Championships.

== Personal best ==
Distance	Time	venue
200 m	20.77 s	Orlando, United States (May 15, 2010)
400 m	45.25 s	Kingston, Jamaica (July 1, 2012)
