= Akheem Gauntlett =

Jamaican sprinter (born 1990)

Personal information
- Born: 26 August 1990 (age 35) Kingston, Jamaica
- Height: 5'11
- Weight: 167

Sport
- Sport: Track and field
- Event: 400 m
- College team: Arkansas Razorbacks
Medal record
Men's athletics
Representing Jamaica
World Championships
Silver medal – second place	2013 Moscow	4 × 400 m relay
World Indoor Championships
Bronze medal – third place	2014 Sopot	4 × 400 m relay

Akheem Gauntlett (born 26 August 1990) is a Jamaican sprinter. He competed in the 4 × 400 meters relay event at the 2013 World Championships in Athletics, winning a silver medal.

Running for the Arkansas Razorbacks track and field team, Gauntlett won the 2012 and 2013 4 × 400 meter relay at the NCAA Division I Indoor Track and Field Championships.

== Personal bests ==
Event	Result	Wind	Venue	Date
60 metres	6.83		Princess Anne (USA)	9 January 2010
100 metres	10.25	1.6	Fayetteville (USA)	11 June 2013
200 metres	20.23	+1.7	Eugine (USA)	23 July 2014
300 metres	32.42		Fayetteville (USA)	8 December 2012
400 metres	45.00		Kingston (JAM)	21 July 2012
4 × 400 metres	3:03.50		Fayetteville (USA)	11 March 2013
