= 2014 IAAF World Indoor Championships – Men's 4 × 400 metres relay =

Men's 4 × 400 metres relay at the 2014 IAAF World Indoor Championships
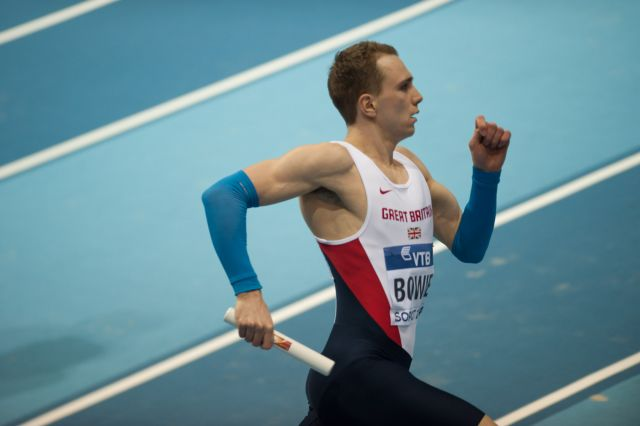
- Jamie Bowie running in the heats for Great Britain.
- Venue: Ergo Arena
- Dates: 8 March (heats); 9 March (final)
- Competitors: 48 from 10 nations
- Winning time: 3:02.13 WIR

Medalists
gold medal	Kyle Clemons; David Verburg; Kind Butler III; Calvin Smith Jr. Clayton Parros*; Ricky Babineaux*	United States
silver medal	Conrad Williams; Jamie Bowie; Luke Lennon-Ford; Nigel Levine; Michael Bingham*	Great Britain
bronze medal	Errol Nolan; Allodin Fothergill; Akheem Gauntlett; Edino Steele; Dane Hyatt*; Jermaine Brown*	Jamaica

The men's 4 × 400 metres relay at the 2014 IAAF World Indoor Championships took place on 8 and 9 March.

== Records ==
Standing records prior to the 2012 IAAF World Indoor Championships
World record	United States (USA)	3:02.83	Maebashi, Japan	7 March 1999
Championship record	United States (USA)	3:02.83	Maebashi, Japan	7 March 1999
World leading	Texas A&M University	3:03.30	College Station, United States	1 March 2014
African record	Nigeria (NGR)	3:09.76	Lisbon, Portugal	10 March 2001
Asian record	Japan (JPN)	3:05.90	Maebashi, Japan	6 March 1999
European record	Poland (POL)	3:03.01	Maebashi, Japan	7 March 1999
North and Central American and Caribbean record	United States (USA)	3:02.83	Maebashi, Japan	7 March 1999
Oceanian record	Australia (AUS)	3:08.49	Seville, Spain	10 March 1991
South American record	Brazil (BRA)	3:10.50	Paris, France	8 March 1997
Records broken during the 2014 IAAF World Indoor Championships
World record	United States (USA)	3:02.13	Sopot, Poland	9 March 2014
African record	Nigeria (NGR)	3:07.95	Sopot, Poland	8 March 2014

== Schedule ==
Date	Time	Round
8 March 2014	11:50	Heats
9 March 2014	18:40	Final

== Results ==
=== Heats ===
Qualification: First 2 in each heat (Q) and the next 2 fastest (q) qualified for the final.

Rank	Heat	Lane	Nation	Athletes	Time	Notes
1	1	6	United States	Clayton Parros, Ricky Babineaux, Kind Butler III, Calvin Smith Jr.	3:04.36	Q
2	2	6	Great Britain	Conrad Williams, Michael Bingham, Jamie Bowie, Luke Lennon-Ford	3:06.09	Q, SB
3	1	4	Jamaica	Errol Nolan, Allodin Fothergill, Dane Hyatt, Jermaine Brown	3:06.12	Q, SB
4	1	5	Poland	Kacper Kozłowski, Patryk Dobek, Łukasz Krawczuk, Jakub Krzewina	3:06.50	q, SB
5	2	4	Russia	Lev Mosin, Denis Kudryavtsev, Aleksandr Khyutte, Vladimir Krasnov	3:06.63	Q, SB
6	1	2	Ukraine	Vitaliy Butrym, Yevhen Hutsol, Dmytro Bikulov, Danylo Danylenko	3:07.54	q, NR
7	2	2	Nigeria	Tobi Ogunmola, Noah Akwu, Salihu Isah, Cristian Morton	3:07.95	AR
8	2	5	Bahamas	Ramon Miller, Michael Mathieu, Andretti Bain, LaToy Williams	3:09.79	
9	1	3	Spain	Mark Ujakpor, Samuel García, Daniel Andújar, Kevin López	3:10.17	SB
10	2	3	Japan	Kengo Yamazaki, Kaisei Yui, Nobuya Kato, Yuzo Kanemaru	3:12.63	SB

=== Final ===
Rank	Lane	Nation	Athletes	Time	Notes
1st place, gold medalist(s)	6	United States	Kyle Clemons, David Verburg, Kind Butler III, Calvin Smith Jr.	3:02.13	WIR
2nd place, silver medalist(s)	5	Great Britain	Conrad Williams, Jamie Bowie, Luke Lennon-Ford, Nigel Levine	3:03.49	SB
3rd place, bronze medalist(s)	3	Jamaica	Errol Nolan, Allodin Fothergill, Akheem Gauntlett, Edino Steele	3:03.69	NR
4	1	Poland	Kacper Kozłowski, Rafał Omelko, Michał Pietrzak, Jakub Krzewina	3:04.39	SB
5	4	Russia	Konstantin Petryashov, Denis Kudryavtsev, Aleksandr Khyutte, Vladimir Krasnov	3:07.12	
6	2	Ukraine	Vitaliy Butrym, Yevhen Hutsol, Dmytro Bikulov, Danylo Danylenko	3:08.79	
