= Jamie Bowie =

Scottish athlete (born 1989)

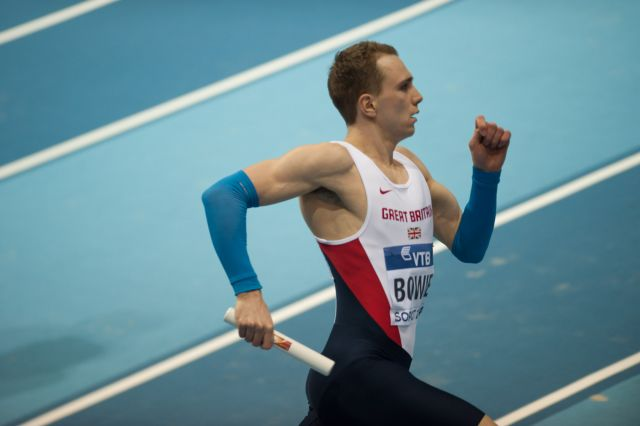
- Jamie Bowie competing at 2014 Sopot

Personal information
- Nationality: Scottish
- Born: 1 April 1989 (age 37) Inverness
- Height: 182 cm (6 ft 0 in)
- Weight: 69 kg (152 lb)

Sport
- Country: Scotland; Great Britain
- Sport: Track and field
- Event(s): 400 m, 4 × 400m Relay
- Coached by: Piotr Haczek

Achievements and titles
- Personal bests: 400 m: 46.58 (Birmingham 2014); 400 m: 46.06 (Ninove, BEL 2013)
Medal record
Men's athletics
Representing Great Britain
World Indoor Championships
Silver medal – second place	2014 Sopot	4×400 m relay
European U23 Championships
Gold medal – first place	2011 Ostrava	4×400 m relay

Jamie Bowie (born 1 April 1989) is a Scottish track and field coach and former athlete who won a silver medal at the 2014 IAAF World Indoor Championships as part of the Great Britain 4 × 400m Relay.

== Career ==
He was born in Inverness and first took part in athletics at primary school. He was with Inverness Harriers for 13 years and was the first member of the club to win a world medal. He left the club and joined Team East Lothian in November 2014, when Inverness Harriers were unable to agree to his request for them to pay part of the salary of his coach, Piotr Haczek.

He was educated at Inverness Royal Academy before commencing studies at Heriot Watt University, graduating with MA (Hons) in International Business Management and Languages degree and a winner of the Watt Club Medal for Languages in 2011. After graduating he took on a part-time job as an athletics development officer in East Lothian.

In the 2011 European Athletics U23 Championships, competing for the Great Britain team he won gold with the 4 × 400m relay.

He ran in the 2013 World Championships in Athletics – Men's 4 × 400 metres relay, and the team ran a season's best but finished fourth. UK Athletics selected him to receive support from the World Class Performance Programme for 2013–2014 because they judged him to have Olympic potential.

On 18 January 2014, while competing at the Scottish National Open in Glasgow he set a personal best of recorded 47.09 seconds, which was the second-fastest time for Scottish men's indoor 400m. On 15 February 2014, he lowered his personal best for 400 Metres on an indoor track to 46.58 seconds, when competing at a British Athletics Grand Prix in Birmingham. He was then selected to run in the Great Britain 4 × 400m relay team at the 2014 IAAF World Indoor Championships, running the third leg and winning a silver medal. He then went to Florida for a month for some intensive training before the Commonwealth Games.

In August 2014, Bowie competed in the 4 × 400 m relay for Scotland team in the xx Commonwealth Games in Glasgow. The relay team finished fifth and set a new Scottish record. Bowie later named his part in this as one of the highlights of his career.

In January 2015, in the first international match of the British Athletics indoor season he ran in the individual 400m, winning the race with a time of 47.38 seconds.

In August 2016 Bowie was appointed as Performance Manager for Scottish Gymnastics, and the following February he was named as team manager for the Scottish gymnastics team at the 2018 Commonwealth Games on the Gold Coast. In April 2017 he announced his retirement from competition. He has continued to be involved with athletics as a coach with Team East Lothian, where he has coached, among others, para-athlete Maria Lyle since 2017.
