= Heather Kampf =

American athlete (born 1987)

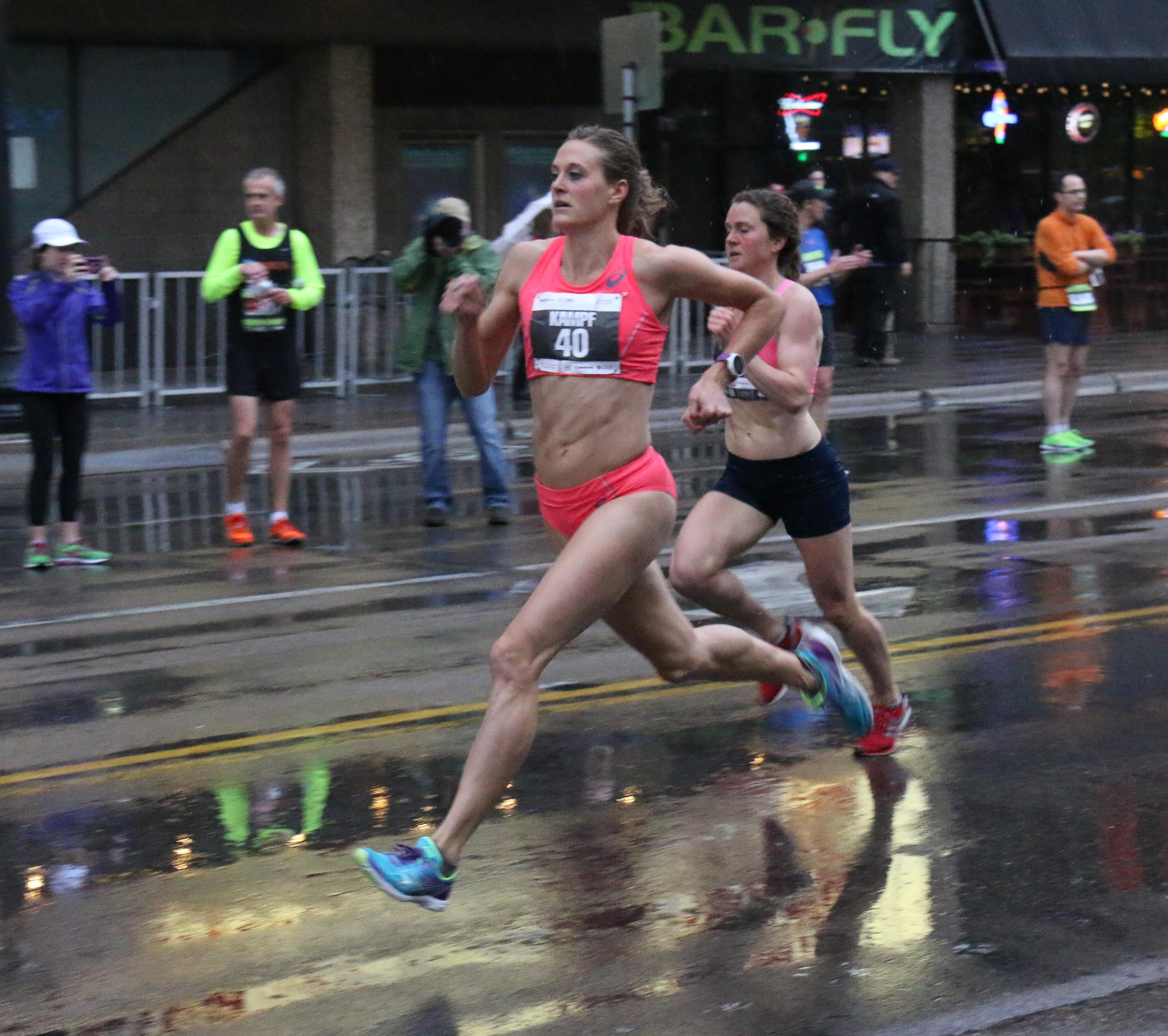
- Kampf's victory, Medtronic TC 1 Mile road race championship, May 14, 2015

Personal information
- Born: January 19, 1987 (age 39) Inver Grove Heights, Minnesota, United States

Sport
- Sport: Track and field
- Event: 1500m
- College team: Minnesota Golden Gophers
- Club: Team USA Minnesota

Heather Kampf (née Dorniden; born January 19, 1987) is an American middle-distance runner and four-time United States National Champion in the 1 mile road race. Kampf competed for the University of Minnesota and since December 2009 has been a member of Team USA Minnesota.

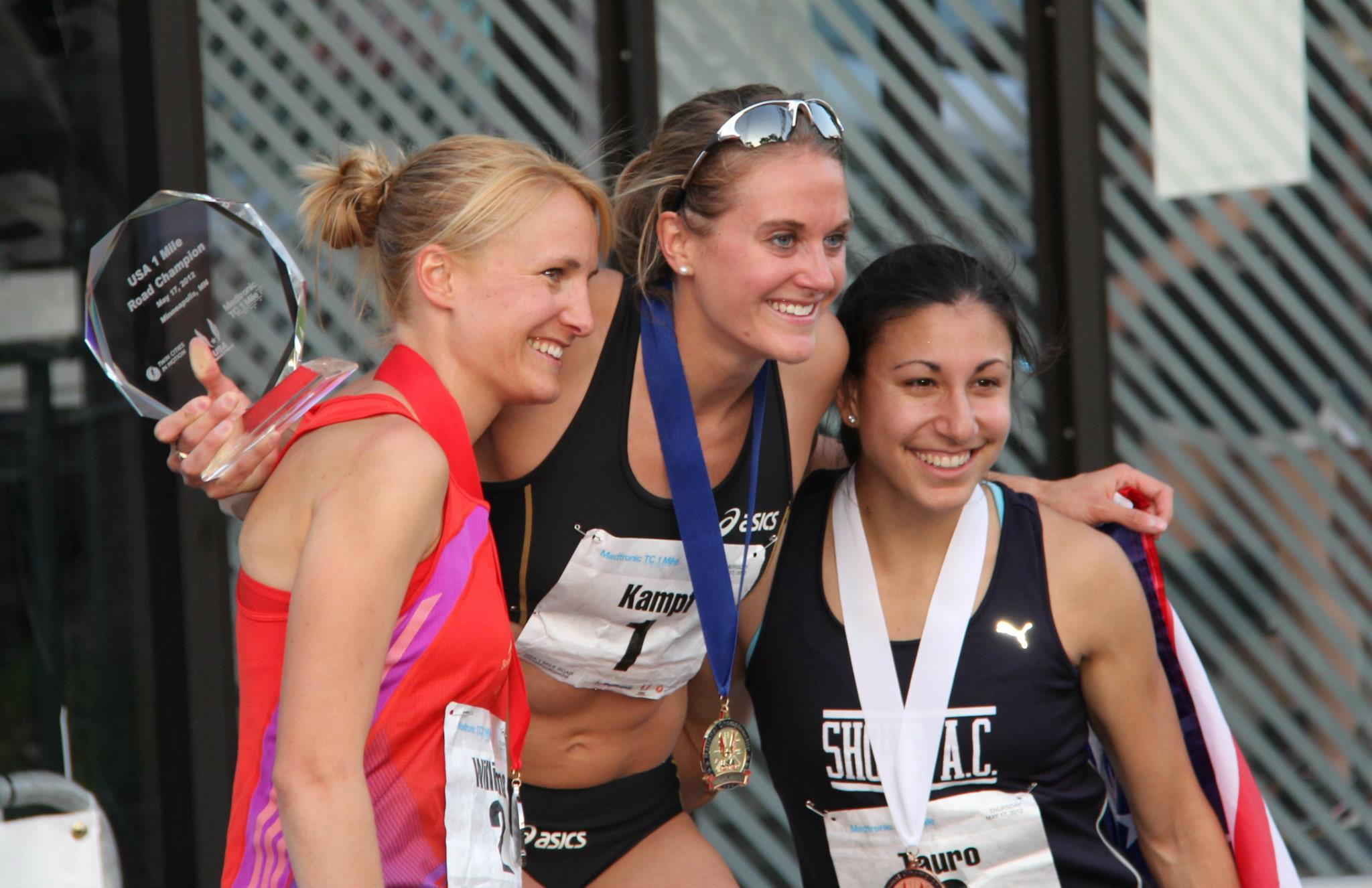
Kampf's victory photo after 8th Medtronic TC 1 Mile road race championship, May 17, 2012, 4:36.9, with second Alisha Williams, 4:39.6, and third Danielle Tauro, at 4:40.0.

== High school ==
Kampf graduated from Rosemount High School in Rosemount, Minnesota, in 2005. At the 2004 Minnesota State Track and Field meet during her junior year, Kampf broke her high school's records in the 400 (55.29) and 800 (2:11.87) meter races en route to becoming the state champion in the 400 meter race and placing third in the 800 meter race. As a senior at the 2005 Minnesota State Track and Field meet, Kampf won the state championship in the 800 meter race, setting a new state record with a time of 2:10.42. She also ran the 400 meter race placing third in a time of 56.62. In 2003 and 2004, Kampf earned All-State honors in cross country. At the 2003 Minnesota State Cross country meet during her junior year, she placed 15th and ran a time of 14:55.7 on the 4 km course.

== College ==
Kampf attended the University of Minnesota in the Twin cities and competed for the Golden Gophers track and field and cross country teams. She graduated in December 2009 with a Bachelor of Science degree in kinesiology. While at the University of Minnesota, Kampf became the school's most decorated women's track and field athlete in history earning All-American honors eight-times, holding ten school records and becoming the only Golden Gopher to compete in every NCAA championship in cross country, indoor and outdoor track during her time at the university. As a freshman in 2006, Kampf was the NCAA Indoor Track and Field Champion in the 800 meter race. In 2008, Kampf won the University of Minnesota's Golden Goldy female athlete of the year award.

Kampf's ten school records were in the following events:

- 400 m indoor - 54.71 (2006)
- 600 m indoor - 1:27.78 (2009)
- 800 m indoor - 2:04.3 (2006)
- 800 m outdoor - 2:01.05 (2007)
- Mile run indoor - 4:38.80 (2009)
- 4x400 m relay indoor - 3:40.77 (2006)
- 4x800 m relay outdoor - 8:27.42 (2007)
- 4x1600 m relay outdoor - 19:06.11 (2008)
- Distance medley relay indoor - 11:07.27 (2006)
- Distance medley relay outdoor - 11:08.16 (2007)

She is also known for a 600 meter race in 2008, in which she fell down 200 meters from the finish, dropping her well behind the other three runners, but recovered to win the race.

== Professional career ==
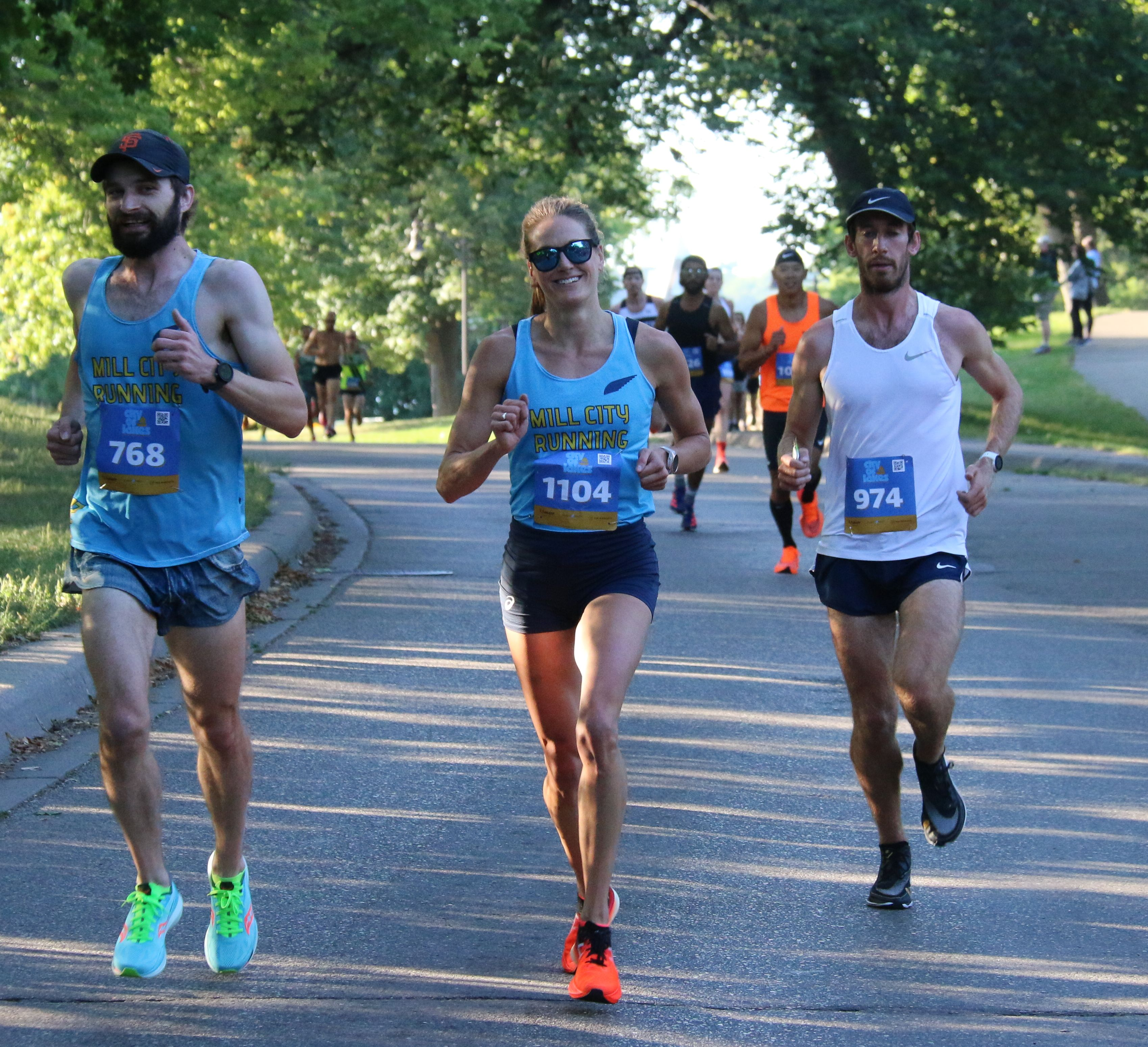
Kampf at City of Lakes half marathon in Minneapolis, September 21, 2022. She finished in 1:13:19, setting the course record.

On March 3, 2014, USA Track and Field announced that Kampf would represent the U.S. at the 2014 World Indoor Championships in Sopot, Poland. Kampf was the first alternate for the women's 1500 m after placing third at the 2014 USA Indoor Track and Field Championships and was named to the team after Mary Cain withdrew from the competition.

On May 24, 2014, Kampf along with teammates Kate Grace, Brenda Martinez, and Katie Mackey set a new American record in the 4 x 1500 meter relay running a time of 16:55.33 at the 2014 IAAF World Relays in Nassau, Bahamas.

On May 14, 2015, in Minneapolis, Minnesota, Kampf won her third USA 1 Mile Road Championship.

== Competition record ==
Year	Competition	Venue	Position	Event	Notes
Representing the United States
2014	World Indoor Championships	Sopot, Poland	—	1500 m	DQ
2014	World Relay Championships	Nassau, Bahamas	2nd	4×1500 m relay	16:55.33 (AR)

=== USA National Championships ===
==== Road ====
Year	Competition	Venue	Position	Event	Notes
2010	USA 1 Mile Championships	Minneapolis, Minnesota	6th	Mile	4:42.1
2011	USA 1 Mile Championships	Minneapolis, Minnesota	2nd	Mile	4:36.3
2012	USA 1 Mile Championships	Minneapolis, Minnesota	1st	Mile	4:36.9
2013	USA 1 Mile Championships	Des Moines, Iowa	3rd	Mile	4:43.69
2014	USA 1 Mile Championships	Des Moines, Iowa	1st	Mile	4:32.62
2015	USA 1 Mile Championships	Minneapolis, Minnesota	1st	Mile	4:45.4
2016	USA 1 Mile Championships	Minneapolis, Minnesota	1st	Mile	4:34.2

==== Outdoor track and field ====
Year	Competition	Venue	Position	Event	Notes
2012	US Olympic Trials	Eugene, Oregon	7th	800 m	2:02.86
2013	USA Outdoor Track and Field Championships	Des Moines, Iowa	6th	800 m	2:00.68
2014	USA Outdoor Track and Field Championships	Sacramento, California	6th	1500 m	4:10.60
2015	USA Outdoor Track and Field Championships	Eugene, Oregon	7th	1500 m	4:16.25
2016	US Olympic Trials	Eugene, Oregon	15th	1500 m	4:13.28
2017	USA Outdoor Track and Field Championships	Sacramento, California	18th	1500 m	4:15.40
2019	USA Outdoor Track and Field Championships	Des Moines, Iowa	26th	1500 m	4:25.45
2020	US Olympic Trials	Eugene, Oregon	23rd	1500 m	4:21.56

==== Indoor track and field ====
Year	Competition	Venue	Position	Event	Notes
2010	USA Indoor Track and Field Championships	Boston, Massachusetts	3rd	800 m	2:02.33
2011	USA Indoor Track and Field Championships	Albuquerque, New Mexico	3rd	800 m	2:04.30
2014	USA Indoor Track and Field Championships	Albuquerque, New Mexico	3rd	1500 m	4:13.04
2016	2016 USA Indoor Track and Field Championships	Portland, Oregon	4th	1500 m	4:11.56
2017	USA Indoor Track and Field Championships	Albuquerque, New Mexico	3rd	1 Mile	4:46.06
2017	USA Indoor Track and Field Championships	Albuquerque, New Mexico	2nd	2 Mile	10:21.80

=== NCAA championships ===
==== Outdoor track and field ====
Year	Competition	Venue	Position	Event	Notes
Representing Minnesota
2006	NCAA Outdoor Track and Field Championships	Sacramento, California	2nd	800 m	2:03.02
2007	NCAA Outdoor Track and Field Championships	Sacramento, California	3rd	800 m	2:01.05
2008	NCAA Outdoor Track and Field Championships	Des Moines, Iowa	5th	800 m	2:05.86
2009	NCAA Outdoor Track and Field Championships	Fayetteville, Arkansas	8th	800 m	2:04.44

==== Indoor track and field ====
Year	Competition	Venue	Position	Event	Notes
Representing Minnesota
2006	NCAA Indoor Track and Field Championships	Fayetteville, Arkansas	1st	800 m	2:05.64
2007	NCAA Indoor Track and Field Championships	Fayetteville, Arkansas	3rd	800 m	2:04.87
2008	NCAA Indoor Track and Field Championships	Fayetteville, Arkansas	2nd	800 m	2:05.45
2009	NCAA Indoor Track and Field Championships	College Station, Texas	3rd	800 m	2:04.43

==== Cross country ====
Year	Competition	Venue	Position	Notes
Representing Minnesota
2006	NCAA Cross Country Championships	Terre Haute, Indiana	185th	22:50.6
2007	NCAA Cross Country Championships	Terre Haute, Indiana	186th	22:15.2
2008	NCAA Cross Country Championships	Terre Haute, Indiana	135th	21:28.8
2009	NCAA Cross Country Championships	Terre Haute, Indiana	84th	21:11.4

== Personal bests ==
Surface	Event	Time	Date	Location
Outdoor track	800 m	2:00.04	July 16, 2013	Lignano Sabbiadoro, Italy
Outdoor track	1500 m	4:04.50	June 4, 2015	Rome, Italy
Outdoor track	Mile	4:30.37	September 9, 2015	Huntington, New York
Indoor track	600 m	1:28.62	February 28, 2007	Champaign, Illinois
Indoor track	800 m	2:02.33	February 28, 2010	Albuquerque, New Mexico
Indoor track	1000 m	2:40.90	February 8, 2014	Boston, Massachusetts
Indoor track	1500 m	4:11.27	March 7, 2014	Sopot, Poland
Indoor track	Mile	4:27.26	February 20, 2016	New York, New York
Indoor track	3000 m	8:51.27	February 4, 2017	New York (Armory), NY
Road	Mile	4:19.7	September 3, 2016	New York, New York
Road	10k	35:28	April 30, 2022	Minneapolis, Minnesota
Road	Half marathon	1:13:19	September 11, 2022	Minneapolis, Minnesota
