= Woodside Stadium =

Athletics stadium in Watford, England

Coordinates: 51.69584°N 0.39465°W

- Interactive map of Woodside Stadium
- Full name: Woodside Stadium
- Location: Horseshoe Lane, Watford WD25 7HH
- Owner: Watford Borough Council
- Capacity: 708

Construction
- Opened: 1955

Tenant
- Watford Harriers Athletics Club

Woodside Stadium is the home of Watford Harriers Athletics Club It is situated in Watford in Hertfordshire and has a seated capacity of 708. Other local athletics clubs training at the stadium include Chiltern Harriers, and Shaftesbury Barnet Harriers.

The venue hosts local school sports league meetings, Southern Men's League, Southern Women's League, Eastern Young Athletes League fixtures for Watford Harriers, in addition to widely attended Open Graded Meetings and British Milers Club competitions.

== History ==
The track was opened on 4 November 1955 and upgraded to a synthetic 8 lane in May 1995. The Watford Harriers built a club house to the north of the track in April 2000, and the track was completely relaid in 2009.
