= Saddam Hussain (athlete) =

Pakistani middle-distance runner

Personal information
- Nationality: Pakistani
- Born: 24 June 1995 (age 30)

Sport
- Sport: Track and field
- Event: 800 metres

Saddam Hussain (born 24 June 1995) is a Pakistani middle-distance runner. He competed in the 800 metres event at the 2014 IAAF World Indoor Championships in Poland but was disqualified after the heat.

The last day of the championships, his coach reported to the police that the athlete was missing. A police spokesman said: "He took away his passport and personal belongings from a hotel room. For now, the athlete has the status of a missing person".

His IAAF statistics report that he has come back to Pakistan, and has been active again in national competitions since 2017.
