= Calvin Smith Jr. =

American sprinter (born 1987)

Calvin Smith
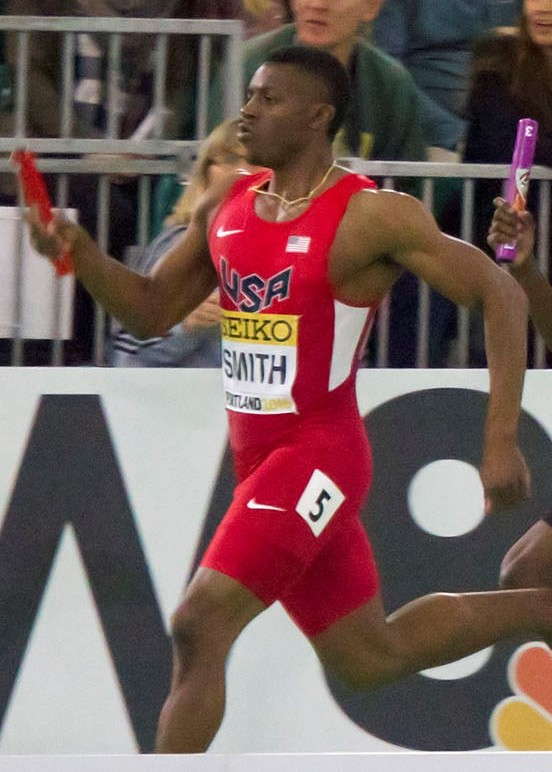
- Smith at the 2016 IAAF World Indoor Championships

Personal information
- Full name: Calvin Smith Jr.
- Born: December 10, 1987 (age 38)
Medal record
Men's athletics
Representing the United States
World Indoor Championships
Gold medal – first place	2012 Istanbul	4 × 400 m relay
Gold medal – first place	2014 Sopot	4 × 400 m relay
Gold medal – first place	2016 Portland	4 × 400 m relay
NACAC Championships
Gold medal – first place	2015 Costa Rica	4 × 400 m relay

Calvin Smith Jr. (born December 10, 1987) is an American athlete who specializes in the 200 m and 400 m. He is the son of former world record-holder, world champion, Olympic medalist and National Track & Field Hall of Famer, Calvin Smith Sr.

Smith is an All-American for University of Florida. He has earned 18 All-America titles, the most in University of Florida track and field history. Smith was also a part of the 2010 NCAA indoor national championship team and was an alternate in the 2008 Beijing Olympic Games on the United States 4 × 400 relay although he did not compete.

He won gold medals in the relay at three consecutive World Indoor Championships starting in 2012.
