= David Verburg =

American sprinter

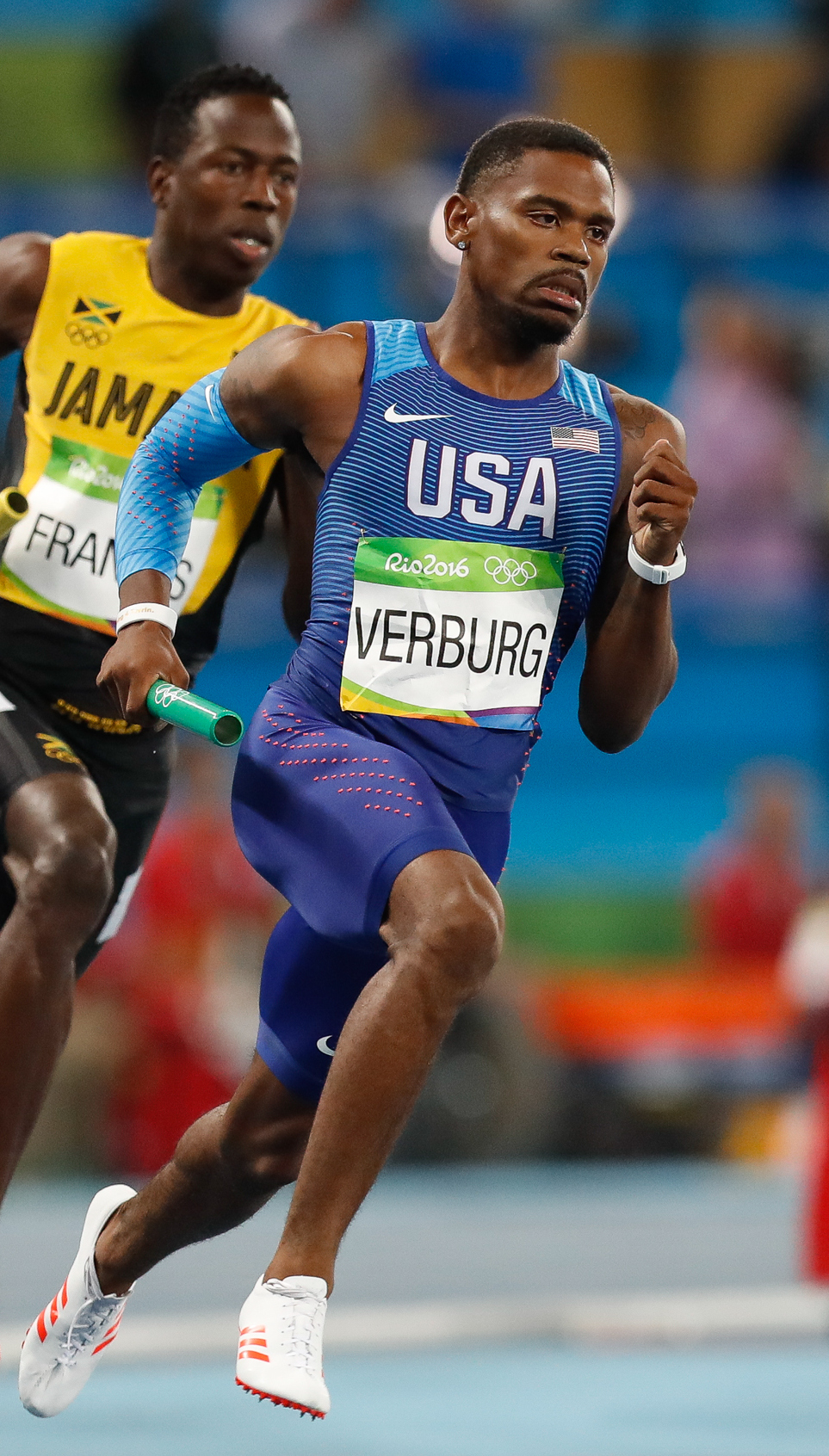
- Verburg at the 2016 Olympics

Personal information
- Nicknames: Davy Crocket, Sanka
- Born: May 14, 1991 (age 35) Oklahoma City, Oklahoma, U.S.
- Education: E. C. Glass High School; George Mason University
- Height: 5 ft 6 in (168 cm)
- Weight: 154 lb (70 kg)

Sport
- Country: United States
- Sport: Athletics (track and field)
- Events: 400 meters, 800 meters
- College team: George Mason University

Achievements and titles
- Personal bests: 400 m - 44.41 (2015); 800 m - 1:50.70 (2017)
Medal record
Men's athletics
Representing the United States
Olympic Games
Gold medal – first place	2016 Rio de Janeiro	4 × 400 m relay
World Championships
Gold medal – first place	2013 Moscow	4 × 400 m relay
Gold medal – first place	2015 Beijing	4 × 400 m relay
World Indoor Championships
Gold medal – first place	2014 Sopot	4 × 400 m relay
World Relay Championships
Gold medal – first place	2014 Nassau	4 × 400 m relay
Gold medal – first place	2015 Nassau	4 × 400 m relay
World Junior Championships
Gold medal – first place	2010 Moncton	4 × 400 m relay
NACAC Under-23 Championships
Gold medal – first place	2012 Irapuato	400 m
Gold medal – first place	2012 Irapuato	4 × 400 m relay

David Verburg (born May 14, 1991) is an American track and field athlete who specializes in the 400 meters. He holds gold medals in the 4 × 400 m relay from the 2016 Olympics; the 2013 and 2015 World Championships; and the 2014 Indoor World Championships.

== Personal ==
David Verburg was born on May 14, 1991, in Oklahoma City, Oklahoma. He attended high school at E. C. Glass High School in Lynchburg, Virginia, graduating in 2009. He attended George Mason University, earning his degree in Sports Management in 2013.

After retirement, Verburg served as an assistant coach for the San Jose State Spartans track and field team and a sprints and hurdles coach for the New Mexico State Aggies track and field team.

== Athletics ==
=== High School & College career ===
Verburg holds the 400 m dash record at his high school, E.C. Glass. with a time of 47.15 seconds. He ran track in college for the George Mason Patriots where he was a four-time outdoor and seven-time indoor All-American.

=== International career ===
In 2010, Verburg gained his first International experience at the IAAF World Junior Championships in Moncton, Canada, winning Gold in the 4 × 400 meter relay.

Verburg was a double gold medalist in the 400 meter dash and 4 × 400 meter relay at the 2012 NACAC Under-23 Championships in Athletics in Irapuato, Mexico.

At the 2013 USA Outdoor Track and Field Championships Verburg finished sixth in the 400 meter dash. The top six finishers were eligible to run in the 4 × 400 relay at the 2013 World Championships in Athletics and as such Verburg was selected to the U.S. team for the World Championships.

In the same year, Verburg ran in both the heats and the finals of the 4 × 400 meter relay at the 2013 World Championships in Moscow, Russia. His team won a gold medal and set a world leading time of 2:58.71.

At the 2015 World Championships, Verburg ran in the finals of the 4 × 400 meter relay, winning gold and again setting a world-leading time of 2:57.82.

== Animal rights ==
Near the end of October 2018, Verburg ran into traffic at an intersection in Clermont, Florida, to rescue a turtle that wandered into traffic. Becoming a viral video on social media, Verburg was a guest on The Ellen DeGeneres Show. In 2019, Verburg would launch the Golden Tortoise Rescue Foundation in his home state of Florida. Due to his views on animal rights, Verburg also has a vegan diet.
