= 2014 IAAF World Indoor Championships =

15th IAAF World Indoor Championships Halowe Mistrzostwa Świata w Lekkoatletyce 2014
- Official competition logo
- Dates: 7–9 March
- Host city: Sopot, Poland
- Venue: Ergo Arena
- Events: 26
- Participation: 538 athletes from 134 nations

The 2014 IAAF World Indoor Championships in Athletics was the fifteenth edition of the international indoor track and field competition, organised by the IAAF. The event was held between 7–9 March 2014 at the Ergo Arena in Sopot, Poland.

== Preparation ==
=== Host bidding ===
The IAAF announced on 1 September 2011 that it had received bids from Poland and Croatia to host the championships. Later Zagreb, Croatia withdrew due to lack of funding. On 11 November 2011 at a Council meeting in Monaco, the IAAF announced that Sopot, as the only remaining bidder, would host the championships. Budapest, Hungary had shown interest but eventually did not bid.

=== Venue ===
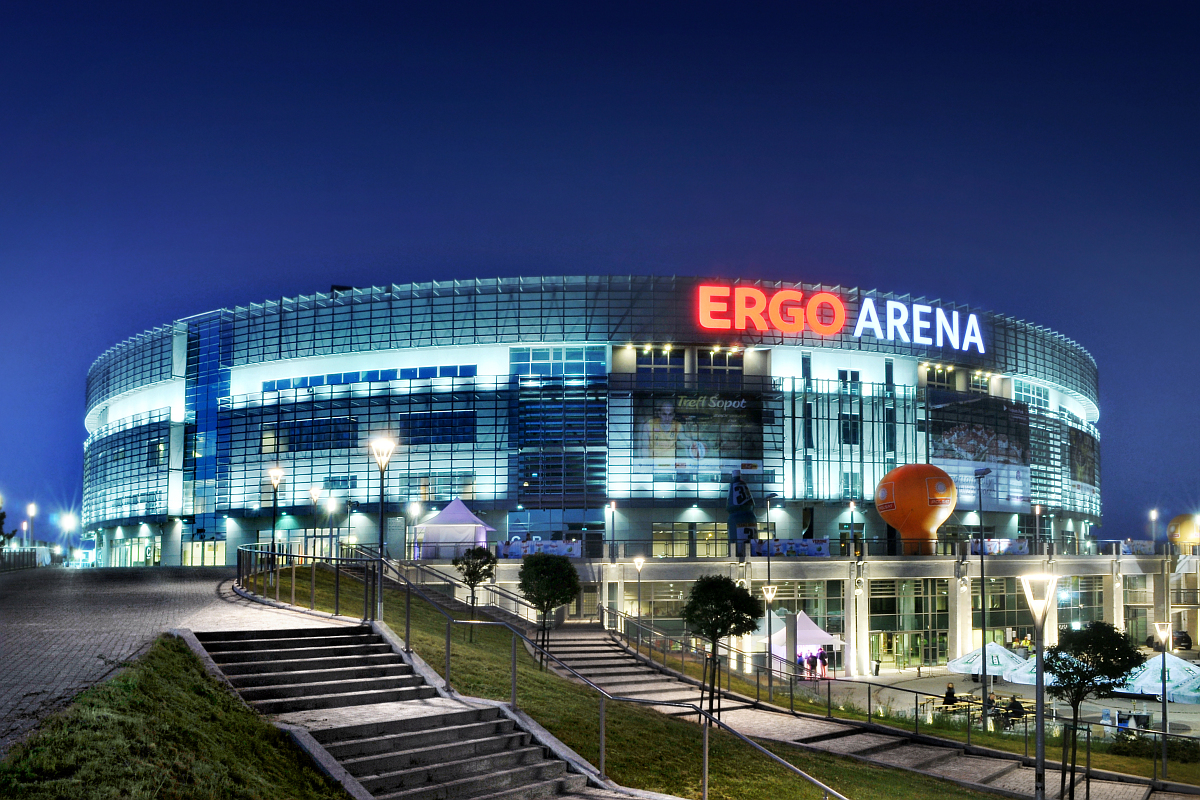
Ergo Arena

The Championships were held at the Ergo Arena, opened in 2010, on the border of the cities of Sopot and Gdańsk. For the Championships it seated 11,000.

For the competition a six-lane, banked 200-metre oval, with a blue surface, was installed on the arena floor, with an eight-lane straight-away track in the center for the 60-metre sprints and hurdles. The track officially opened on 16 February and almost 6000 people came to the ERGO Arena to mark its inauguration. The indoor portable banked track made by Mondo used the company's "Super X" rubberized surface (two layers, total 13.5 mm thick), which was used at both the 2008 and 2012 Summer Olympics. After the competition the track has been dismantled and moved permanently to the newly built indoor arena in Toruń.

=== American television coverage ===
The IAAF again chose not to get wide coverage in the large United States market. Instead they sold exclusive rights to Universal Sports, a network associated with NBC Sports. Universal Sports can only be seen in about ten percent of the households in the American market. Universal Sports limited other distribution of the content, even online content requiring login with cable subscription user names. For those viewers without access to Universal Sports, nationwide coverage of the entire meet was blacked out. IAAF supported the blackout of coverage. Unlike previous World Championship meetings, IAAF's YouTube channel provided only post race interviews and no coverage of the actual events at the meet.

== Schedule ==
Legend
Key	P	Q	H	½	F
Value	Preliminary round	Qualifiers	Heats	Semifinals	Final

All dates are CET (UTC+1)

Men
Date	7 Mar		8 Mar			9 Mar		
Event	M	A	M	A		M	A	
60 m		H		½	F			
400 m	H	½		F				
800 m	H						F	
1500 m	H			F				
3000 m		H					F	
60 m hurdles			H				½	F
4 × 400 m relay			H				F	
Long jump		Q		F				
Triple jump			Q				F	
High jump			Q				F	
Pole vault				F				
Shot put	Q	F						
Heptathlon	F							

Women
Date →	7 Mar		8 Mar			9 Mar		
Event ↓	M	A	M	A		M	A	
60 m			H				½	F
400 m	H	½		F				
800 m	H						F	
1500 m		H		F				
3000 m	H						F	
60 m hurdles		H		½	F			
4 × 400 m relay			H				F	
Long jump			Q				F	
Triple jump	Q			F				
High jump	Q			F				
Pole vault							F	
Shot put			Q	F				
Pentathlon	F							

== Medal summary ==
=== Men ===
Event	Gold		Silver		Bronze	
60 metres	Richard Kilty; Great Britain	6.49 PB	Marvin Bracy; United States	6.51	Femi Ogunode; Qatar	6.52
400 metres	Pavel Maslák; Czech Republic	45.24 NR	Chris Brown; Bahamas	45.58 PB	Kyle Clemons; United States	45.74
800 metres	Mohammed Aman; Ethiopia	1:46.40	Adam Kszczot; Poland	1:46.76	Andrew Osagie; Great Britain	1:47.10
1500 metres	Ayanleh Souleiman; Djibouti	3:37.52	Aman Wote; Ethiopia	3:38.08	Abdalaati Iguider; Morocco	3:38.21
3000 metres	Caleb Mwangangi Ndiku; Kenya	7:54.94	Bernard Lagat; United States	7:55.22	Dejen Gebremeskel; Ethiopia	7:55.39
60 metres hurdles	Omo Osaghae; United States	7.45 WL	Pascal Martinot-Lagarde; France	7.46	Garfield Darien; France	7.47 PB
4 × 400 metres relay	United States; Kyle Clemons; David Verburg; Kind Butler III; Calvin Smith Jr. Clayton Parros*; Ricky Babineaux*	3:02.13 WR	Great Britain; Conrad Williams; Jamie Bowie; Luke Lennon-Ford; Nigel Levine; Michael Bingham*	3:03.49	Jamaica; Errol Nolan; Allodin Fothergill; Akheem Gauntlett; Edino Steele; Dane Hyatt*; Jermaine Brown*	3:03.69 NR
High jump	Mutaz Essa Barshim; Qatar	2.38 m AR	Andriy Protsenko; Ukraine	2.36 m PB	Erik Kynard; United States	2.34 m SB
Pole vault	Konstadinos Filippidis; Greece	5.80 m SB	Malte Mohr; Germany	5.80 m	Jan Kudlička; Czech Republic	5.80 m PB
Long jump	Mauro Vinícius da Silva; Brazil	8.28 m NR	Li Jinzhe; China	8.23 m SB	Michel Tornéus; Sweden	8.21 m SB
Triple jump	Ernesto Revé; Cuba	17.33 m WL	Pedro Pichardo; Cuba	17.24 m	Marian Oprea; Romania	17.21 m
Shot put	Ryan Whiting; United States	22.05 m	David Storl; Germany	21.79 m SB	Tomas Walsh; New Zealand	21.26 m AR
Heptathlon	Ashton Eaton; United States	6632 pts WL	Andrei Krauchanka; Belarus	6303 pts NR	Thomas van der Plaetsen; Belgium	6259 pts NR

- Note: * = Relay athletes who only ran in heats

=== Women ===
Event	Gold		Silver		Bronze	
60 metres	Shelly-Ann Fraser-Pryce; Jamaica	6.98 WL	Murielle Ahouré; Ivory Coast	7.01 SB	Tianna Bartoletta; United States	7.06 SB
400 metres	Francena McCorory; United States	51.12	Kaliese Spencer; Jamaica	51.54 PB	Shaunae Miller; Bahamas	52.06
800 metres	Chanelle Price; United States	2:00.09 WL	Angelika Cichocka; Poland	2:00.45	Maryna Arzamasava; Belarus	2:00.79 PB
1500 metres	Abeba Aregawi; Sweden	4:00.61	Axumawit Embaye; Ethiopia	4:07.12 PB	Nicole Sifuentes; Canada	4:07.61 NR
3000 metres	Genzebe Dibaba; Ethiopia	8:55.04	Hellen Onsando Obiri; Kenya	8:57.72	Maryam Yusuf Jamal; Bahrain	8:59.16
60 metres hurdles	Nia Ali; United States	7.80 PB	Sally Pearson; Australia	7.85	Tiffany Porter; Great Britain	7.86 SB
4 × 400 metres relay	United States; Natasha Hastings; Joanna Atkins; Francena McCorory; Cassandra Tate; Jernail Hayes*; Monica Hargrove*	3:24.83 WL	Jamaica; Patricia Hall; Anneisha McLaughlin; Kaliese Spencer; Stephenie Ann McPherson; Verone Chambers*; Natoya Goule*	3:26.54 NR	Great Britain; Eilidh Child; Shana Cox; Margaret Adeoye; Christine Ohuruogu; Victoria Ohuruogu*	3:27.90
High jump	Mariya Kuchina; Russia Kamila Lićwinko; Poland	2.00 m SB 2.00 m =NR	Not awarded		Ruth Beitia; Spain	2.00 m SB
Pole vault	Yarisley Silva; Cuba	4.70 m	Anzhelika Sidorova; Russia Jiřina Svobodová; Czech Republic	4.70 m 4.70 m	Not awarded	
Long jump	Éloyse Lesueur; France	6.85 m	Katarina Johnson-Thompson; Great Britain	6.81 m PB	Ivana Španović; Serbia	6.77 m
Triple jump	Ekaterina Koneva; Russia	14.46 m	Olha Saladuha; Ukraine	14.45 m	Kimberly Williams; Jamaica	14.39 m SB
Shot put	Valerie Adams; New Zealand	20.67 m WL	Christina Schwanitz; Germany	19.94 m	Gong Lijiao; China	19.24 m SB
Pentathlon	Nadine Broersen; Netherlands	4830 pts WL,NR	Brianne Theisen-Eaton; Canada	4768 pts NR	Alina Fyodorova; Ukraine	4724 pts PB

- Note: * = Relay athletes who only ran in heats

== Medal table ==
* Host nation (Poland)

Rank	Nation	Gold	Silver	Bronze	Total
1	United States (USA)	8	2	3	13
2	Ethiopia (ETH)	2	2	1	5
3	Cuba (CUB)	2	1	0	3
3	Russia (RUS)	2	1	0	3
5	Great Britain (GBR)	1	2	3	6
6	Jamaica (JAM)	1	2	2	5
7	Poland (POL)*	1	2	0	3
8	Czech Republic (CZE)	1	1	1	3
8	France (FRA)	1	1	1	3
10	Kenya (KEN)	1	1	0	2
11	New Zealand (NZL)	1	0	1	2
11	Qatar (QAT)	1	0	1	2
11	Sweden (SWE)	1	0	1	2
14	Brazil (BRA)	1	0	0	1
14	Djibouti (DJI)	1	0	0	1
14	Greece (GRE)	1	0	0	1
14	Netherlands (NED)	1	0	0	1
18	Germany (GER)	0	3	0	3
19	Ukraine (UKR)	0	2	1	3
20	Bahamas (BAH)	0	1	1	2
20	Belarus (BLR)	0	1	1	2
20	Canada (CAN)	0	1	1	2
20	China (CHN)	0	1	1	2
24	Australia (AUS)	0	1	0	1
24	Ivory Coast (CIV)	0	1	0	1
26	Bahrain (BHR)	0	0	1	1
26	Belgium (BEL)	0	0	1	1
26	Morocco (MAR)	0	0	1	1
26	Romania (ROU)	0	0	1	1
26	Serbia (SRB)	0	0	1	1
26	Spain (ESP)	0	0	1	1
Totals (31 entries)		27	26	25	78

== Disqualifications ==
Athletes with track boundary disqualifications
Athlete	Nation	Event
Edino Steele	Jamaica	Men's 400 m semi-final
Saddam Hussain	Pakistan	Men's 800 m heats
Marcin Lewandowski	Poland	Men's 800 m final
Aníta Hinriksdóttir	Iceland	Women's 800 m heats
Nicholas Willis	New Zealand	Men's 1500 m final
Rababe Arafi	Morocco	Women's 1500 m final
Heather Kampf	United States	Women's 1500 m final
Yoann Kowal	France	Men's 3000 m heats

A number of athletes were disqualified for stepping over the inside track boundary and onto the in-field. The most high profile of these disqualifications was Poland's Marcin Lewandowski in the men's 800 m final. The host nation athlete originally won the bronze medal but a single step on the in-field led to his disqualification and the promotion of Great Britain's Andrew Osagie into the third podium position.

There was a similar occurrence in the women's 1500 m final, where Rababe Arafi took the bronze and she also received the honour in a medal ceremony. Half an hour afterwards, a review of race footage led to her being disqualified with Canada's Nicole Sifuentes being promoted to bronze position. Nick Willis, the original men's 1500 m fourth placer, was another high-profile disqualification.

Outside of the in-field track infringements, there were a smaller number of disqualifications. Reflecting the more physical nature of indoor competition, Richard Buck, Lisanne de Witte and Ioan Zaizan were all disqualified for obstruction or jostling. Siologa Viliamu Sepa and Musaeb Abdulrahman Balla were removed for lane infringement, while Michael Herreros' performance was erased due to improper hurdling. No athletes fell foul of the false start rule.

=== Doping ===
Athletes disqualified for doping
Athlete	Nation	Event
Kseniya Ryzhova	Russia	Women's 4×400 m relay
Nataliia Lupu	Ukraine	Women's 800 meters
Anca Heltne	Romania	Women's shot put

The Russian women's 4×400 m relay team was disqualified after Kseniya Ryzhovas doping sample from 7 March was found positive for trimetazidine. Nataliia Lupu (UKR) was disqualified from the Women's 800 meters after her doping sample was found positive for Methylhexaneamine. The Romanian shot putter Anca Heltne took part in the championships but was disqualified from all her results after a doping control carried out on 7 February 2014 showed she'd been using the anabolic steroids Dianabol and Oral Turinabol.

== Records ==
One championship record was broken at the competition: the American men's 4 × 400 metres relay team ran a time of 3:02.13 minutes, which was also a world indoor record for the event (a time of 3:01.96 minutes was set by an American team in 2006 but this was not ratified due to a lack of a post-race EPO drug test). Six area (continental) indoor records were broken at the competition, as well as two men's heptathlon championship bests and numerous indoor national records in athletics.

Athlete	Nation	Event	Performance	Type
Levern Spencer	Saint Lucia	High jump	1.95 m	NR
Tomas Walsh	New Zealand	Shot put	20.41 m	NR
Tomas Walsh	New Zealand	Shot put	21.26 m	AR
Franck Elemba	Republic of the Congo	Shot put	17.74 m	NR
Brianne Theisen-Eaton	Canada	Pentathlon	4768 pts	NR
Mitja Krevs	Slovenia	1500 metres	3:43.22 min	NR
Wesam Al-Massri	Palestine	1500 metres	3:53.84 min	NR
Nadine Broersen	Netherlands	High jump (in heptathlon)	1.93 m	NR
Nadine Broersen	Netherlands	Pentathlon	4830 pts	NR
Ashton Eaton	United States	60 metres hurdles (heptathlon)	7.64 sec	Championship best
Farkhod Kuralov	Tajikistan	800 metres	1:52.36 min	NR
Brice Etès	Monaco	800 metres	1:51.24 min	NR
Yvette Lewis	Panama	60 metres hurdles	7.91 sec	AR
Andrea Ivančević	Croatia	60 metres hurdles	8.10 sec	NR
Andrea Ivančević	Croatia	60 metres hurdles	8.09 sec	NR
Gnima Faye	Senegal	60 metres hurdles	8.15 sec	NR
LaVonne Idlette	Dominican Republic	60 metres hurdles	8.16 sec	NR
Reza Ghasemi	Iran	60 metres	6.58 sec	NR
Sibusiso Matsenjwa	Swaziland	60 metres	6.88 sec	NR
Faresa Kapisi	American Samoa	60 metres	7.14 sec	NR
Benjamín Véliz	Nicaragua	60 metres	7.27 sec	NR
Adrian Strzałkowski	Poland	Long jump	8.18 m	NR
Luis Rivera	Mexico	Long jump	8.01 m	NR
Eliane Saholinirina	Madagascar	1500 metres	4:19.64	NR
Georgi Ivanov	Bulgaria	Shot put	21.02 m	NR
Zane Robertson	New Zealand	3000 metres	7:44.16 min	NR
Abdulaziz Al-Mandeel	Kuwait	60 metres hurdles	7.74 sec	NR
Amir Shaker	Iraq	60 metres hurdles	7.96 sec	NR
Iong Kim Fai	Macau	60 metres hurdles	8.34 sec	NR
Nelson Camilo Acebey	Bolivia	60 metres hurdles	8.48 sec	NR
Natalia Ducó	Chile	Shot put	17.24 m	NR
Patricia Taea	Cook Islands	60 metres	7.93 sec	NR
Lovelite Detenamo	Nauru	60 metres	7.94 sec	NR
Vitaliy Butrym; Yevhen Hutsol; Dmytro Bikulov; Danylo Danylenko	Ukraine	4 × 400 metres relay	3:07.54 min	NR
Tobi Ogunmola; Noah Akwu; Salihu Isah; Cristian Morton	Nigeria	4 × 400 metres relay	3:07.95 min	AR
Maria Enrica Spacca; Elena Maria Bonfanti; Marta Milani; Chiara Bazzoni	Italy	4 × 400 metres relay	3:31.99 min	NR
Verone Chambers; Anneisha McLaughlin; Natoya Goule; Stephenie Ann McPherson	Jamaica	4 × 400 metres relay	3:29.43 min	NR
Gerald Phiri	Zambia	60 metres	6.57 sec	NR
Gerald Phiri	Zambia	60 metres	6.52 sec	NR
Gabriel Mvumvure	Zimbabwe	60 metres	6.60 sec	NR
Nicole Sifuentes	Canada	1500 metres	4:07.61 min	NR
Andrei Krauchanka	Belarus	Heptathlon	6303 pts	NR
Andrei Krauchanka	Belarus	High jump (in heptathlon)	2.21 m	Championship best
Thomas van der Plaetsen	Belgium	Heptathlon	6259 pts	NR
Oleksiy Kasyanov	Ukraine	1000 metres (in heptathlon)	2:39.44 min	NR
Pavel Maslák	Czech Republic	400 metres	45.24 sec	NR
Kamila Lićwinko	Poland	High jump	2.00 m	NR
Su Bingtian	China	60 metres	6.52 sec	NR
Aitor Gomez	Gibraltar	1500 metres	4:07.34 min	NR
Mauro Vinícius da Silva	Brazil	Long jump	8.28 m	NR

== Participating nations ==
- Albania (1)
- American Samoa (1)
- Andorra (1)
- Anguilla (1)
- Antigua and Barbuda (1)
- Argentina (1)
- Armenia (1)
- Aruba (1)
- Australia (3)
- Austria (2)
- Azerbaijan (1)
- Bahamas (11)
- Bahrain (2)
- Belarus (8)
- Belgium (4)
- Bolivia (1)
- Bosnia and Herzegovina (1)
- Brazil (7)
- British Virgin Islands (1)
- Bulgaria (2)
- Canada (9)
- Chile (1)
- China (12)
- Chinese Taipei (1)
- Comoros (1)
- Republic of the Congo (1)
- Cook Islands (1)
- Costa Rica (1)
- Croatia (3)
- Cuba (6)
- Cyprus (1)
- Czech Republic (8)
- Denmark (2)
- Djibouti (2)
- Dominica (1)
- Dominican Republic (3)
- Egypt (1)
- Equatorial Guinea (1)
- Estonia (2)
- Ethiopia (9)
- Finland (3)
- France (7)
- French Polynesia (1)
- Gabon (1)
- Georgia (1)
- Germany (20)
- Ghana (1)
- Gibraltar (1)
- Great Britain (32)
- Greece (5)
- Grenada (1)
- Guam (1)
- Guyana (2)
- Haiti (1)
- Honduras (1)
- Hong Kong (1)
- Hungary (2)
- Iceland (2)
- Iran (2)
- Iraq (1)
- Ireland (5)
- Israel (1)
- Italy (12)
- Ivory Coast (1)
- Jamaica (22)
- Japan (5)
- Kazakhstan (4)
- Kenya (7)
- Kuwait (1)
- Kyrgyzstan (1)
- Latvia (1)
- Lebanon (1)
- Lithuania (1)
- Luxembourg (1)
- Macau (1)
- Macedonia (1)
- Madagascar (1)
- Malta (1)
- Marshall Islands (1)
- Mauritius (1)
- Mexico (1)
- Federated States of Micronesia (1)
- Moldova (1)
- Monaco (1)
- Morocco (6)
- Nauru (1)
- Netherlands (12)
- New Zealand (5)
- Nicaragua (1)
- Nigeria (11)
- Northern Mariana Islands (1)
- Norway (1)
- Oman (1)
- Pakistan (1)
- Palestine (1)
- Panama (2)
- Papua New Guinea (1)
- Paraguay (1)
- Peru (1)
- Poland (35)
- Portugal (3)
- Puerto Rico (1)
- Qatar (4)
- Romania (8)
- Russia (36)
- Saint Kitts and Nevis (2)
- Saint Lucia (1)
- Saint Vincent and the Grenadines (1)
- Samoa (1)
- San Marino (1)
- Senegal (1)
- Serbia (2)
- Seychelles (1)
- Singapore (1)
- Slovakia (2)
- Slovenia (4)
- Somalia (1)
- South Africa (6)
- Spain (11)
- Sudan (1)
- Swaziland (1)
- Sweden (7)
- Switzerland (1)
- Tajikistan (1)
- Trinidad and Tobago (4)
- Turkey (3)
- Ukraine (19)
- United Arab Emirates (2)
- United States (48)
- United States Virgin Islands (2)
- Uruguay (1)
- Uzbekistan (2)
- Zambia (1)
- Zimbabwe (2)
