= Clayton Parros =

American male track and field sprinter

Personal information
- Born: December 11, 1990 (age 35) Los Angeles, California, U.S.
- Height: 6 ft 0 in (183 cm)
- Weight: 170 lb (77 kg)

Sport
- Sport: Athletics
- College team: North Carolina Tar Heels

Achievements and titles
- Personal best: 400 m: 45.25 (2014)
Medal record
Men's athletics
Representing United States
World Indoor Championships
Gold medal – first place	2014 Sopot	4 × 400 m relay

Clayton Parros (born December 11, 1990) is an American male track and field sprinter who specializes in the 400-meter dash. He was a runner in the gold medal-winning American 4 × 400 metres relay teams at the 2009 Pan American Junior Athletics Championships and the 2015 NACAC Championships in Athletics, setting a championship record of 3:00.07 minutes at the latter meet. He also ran as the alternate heats runner for the American teams that won gold medals at the 2014 IAAF World Indoor Championships and the 2014 IAAF World Relays.

Born in Los Angeles, California and raised in Bloomfield, New Jersey, Parros attended Seton Hall Preparatory School and University of North Carolina - Chapel Hill. He competed collegiately for the North Carolina Tar Heels and was twice Atlantic Coast Conference indoor champion over 400 m and won three ACC 4 × 400 metres relay titles.

At national level, he was runner-up in the 300-meter dash at the 2015 USA Indoor Track and Field Championships.

== International competitions ==
Year	Competition	Venue	Position	Event	Notes
2009	Pan American Junior Championships	Port of Spain, Trinidad and Tobago	1st	4 × 400 m relay	3:03.25
2014	World Indoor Championships	Sopot, Poland	1st	4 × 400 m relay	3:04.36 (heats)
2014	World Relays	Nassau, Bahamas	1st	4 × 400 m relay	3:01.09 (heats)
2015	NACAC Championships	San José, Costa Rica	1st	4 × 100 m relay	3:00.07 CR
