= 1992 World Junior Championships in Athletics – Women's 4 × 100 metres relay =

The women's 4x100 metres relay event at the 1992 World Junior Championships in Athletics was held in Seoul, South Korea, at Olympic Stadium on 19 and 20 September.

== Medalists ==
Gold	Gillian Russell; Merlene Frazer; Michelle Christie; Nikole Mitchell; Jamaica
Silver	Benita Kelley; Zundra Feagin; Lesa Parker; Marion Jones; United States
Bronze	Katja Seidel; Gabi Rockmeier; Birgit Rockmeier; Silke Lichtenhagen; Germany

== Results ==
=== Final ===
20 September

Rank	Nation	Competitors	Time	Notes
1st place, gold medalist(s)	Jamaica	Gillian Russell; Merlene Frazer; Michelle Christie; Nikole Mitchell	43.96	
2nd place, silver medalist(s)	United States	Benita Kelley; Zundra Feagin; Lesa Parker; Marion Jones	44.51	
3rd place, bronze medalist(s)	Germany	Katja Seidel; Gabi Rockmeier; Birgit Rockmeier; Silke Lichtenhagen	44.52	
4	United Kingdom	Lisa Armstrong; Katharine Merry; Sophia Smith; Donna Hoggarth	44.62	
5	France	Gwenolee Helbert; Christine Arron; Delphine Combe; Aline André	44.70	
6	Japan	Kanae Ito; Kazue Kakinuma; Nami Shoji; Tomomi Kaneko	44.90	
7	Cuba	Idalia Hechavarría; Dainelky Pérez; Damaris Anderson; Oraidis Ramírez	45.11	
8	Italy	Francesca Da Boit; Laura Mascia; Giancarla Marinelli; Giada Gallina	45.32	

=== Heats ===
19 September

==== Heat 1 ====
Rank	Nation	Competitors	Time	Notes
1	Jamaica	Michelle Christie; Gillian Russell; Beverley Langley; Nikole Mitchell	44.40	Q
2	Germany	Katja Seidel; Gabi Rockmeier; Birgit Rockmeier; Silke Lichtenhagen	44.61	Q
3	Japan	Kanae Ito; Kazue Kakinuma; Nami Shoji; Tomomi Kaneko	44.98	q
4	Canada	Sonia Paquette; Camille Noel; Mame Twumasi; Tara Perry	45.84	
5	Spain	Carmen Blay; Marta Sánchez; Mireia Ruíz; Maribel Rodríguez	46.41	
6	Nigeria	Calister Uba; Endurance Ojokolo; Onyinye Chikezie; Amarachukwu Eze	46.58	
	Australia	Colinda Farrar; Fiona Blair; Donna Adamson; Bindee Goon Chew	DNF	
	Commonwealth of Independent States	Natalya Anisimova; Oksana Dyachenko; Irina Pukha; Yekaterina Leshchova	DNF	

==== Heat 2 ====
Rank	Nation	Competitors	Time	Notes
1	France	Gwenolee Helbert; Christine Arron; Delphine Combe; Aline André	44.52	Q
2	United States	Benita Kelley; Zundra Feagin; Lesa Parker; Marion Jones	44.55	Q
3	United Kingdom	Lisa Armstrong; Katharine Merry; Sophia Smith; Donna Hoggarth	44.88	q
4	Italy	Francesca Da Boit; Laura Mascia; Giancarla Marinelli; Giada Gallina	45.24	q
5	Cuba	Idalia Hechavarría; Dainelky Pérez; Damaris Anderson; Reyna Carretero	45.38	q
6	China	He Ling; Hu Ling; Chen Yanchun; Zhang Chunying	45.78	
7	South Korea	Park Eun-Hee; Byun Yeong-Rye; Song Eun-Young; Lee Yeon-Ju	47.15	
	Sweden	Charlotta Vöcks; Linda Hansson; Ulrika Larsson; Marie Westerlund	DNF	

== Participation ==
According to an unofficial count, 66 athletes from 16 countries participated in the event.

- Australia (4)
- Canada (4)
- China (4)
- Commonwealth of Independent States (4)
- Cuba (5)
- France (4)
- Germany (4)
- Italy (4)
- Jamaica (5)
- Japan (4)
- Nigeria (4)
- South Korea (4)
- Spain (4)
- Sweden (4)
- United Kingdom (4)
- United States (4)
