= 1992 World Junior Championships in Athletics – Women's 200 metres =

The women's 200 metres event at the 1992 World Junior Championships in Athletics was held in Seoul, South Korea, at Olympic Stadium on 18 and 19 September.

== Medalists ==
Gold	Hu Ling; China
Silver	Cathy Freeman; Australia
Bronze	Merlene Frazer; Jamaica

== Results ==
=== Final ===
19 September
Wind: +0.3 m/s

Rank	Name	Nationality	Time	Notes
1st place, gold medalist(s)	Hu Ling	China	23.14	
2nd place, silver medalist(s)	Cathy Freeman	Australia	23.25	
3rd place, bronze medalist(s)	Merlene Frazer	Jamaica	23.29	
4	Jacqueline Poelman	Netherlands	23.38	
5	Katharine Merry	United Kingdom	23.59	
6	Giada Gallina	Italy	23.74	
7	Marion Jones	United States	24.09	
8	Silke Lichtenhagen	Germany	24.22	

=== Semifinals ===
18 September

==== Semifinal 1 ====
Wind: +0.7 m/s

Rank	Name	Nationality	Time	Notes
1	Katharine Merry	United Kingdom	23.38	Q
2	Silke Lichtenhagen	Germany	23.78	Q
3	Marion Jones	United States	23.81	q
4	Marie Westerlund	Sweden	23.86	
5	Aline André	France	24.16	
6	Beverley Langley	Jamaica	24.31	
7	Mireille Donders	Switzerland	24.52	
8	Debbie Ferguson	Bahamas	24.74	

==== Semifinal 2 ====
Wind: +0.3 m/s

Rank	Name	Nationality	Time	Notes
1	Hu Ling	China	23.36	Q
2	Jacqueline Poelman	Netherlands	23.55	Q
3	Giada Gallina	Italy	23.82	q
4	Zundra Feagin	United States	23.88	
5	Oksana Dyachenko	Commonwealth of Independent States	24.11	
6	Sophia Smith	United Kingdom	24.15	
7	Mame Twumasi	Canada	24.19	
8	Onyinye Chikezie	Nigeria	24.58	

==== Semifinal 3 ====
Wind: +0.1 m/s

Rank	Name	Nationality	Time	Notes
1	Cathy Freeman	Australia	23.29	Q
2	Merlene Frazer	Jamaica	23.47	Q
3	Laura Mascia	Italy	24.01	
4	Chen Yanchun	China	24.14	
5	Katja Seidel	Germany	24.26	
6	Nicole Devonish	Canada	24.28	
7	Katarzyna Zakrzewska	Poland	24.34	
8	Lucimar Aparecida de Moura	Brazil	24.86	

=== Heats ===
18 September

==== Heat 1 ====
Wind: +0.6 m/s

Rank	Name	Nationality	Time	Notes
1	Merlene Frazer	Jamaica	23.58	Q
2	Laura Mascia	Italy	24.04	Q
3	Oksana Dyachenko	Commonwealth of Independent States	24.11	Q
4	Sophia Smith	United Kingdom	24.15	Q
5	Katja Seidel	Germany	24.27	q
6	Mame Twumasi	Canada	24.29	q
7	Marliese Steyn	South Africa	24.65	
8	Wan Kin Yee	Hong Kong	26.02	

==== Heat 2 ====
Wind: +0.8 m/s

Rank	Name	Nationality	Time	Notes
1	Katharine Merry	United Kingdom	23.43	Q
2	Jacqueline Poelman	Netherlands	23.66	Q
3	Marie Westerlund	Sweden	23.97	Q
4	Katarzyna Zakrzewska	Poland	24.12	Q
5	Grace Birungi	Uganda	24.74	
6	Amarachukwu Eze	Nigeria	25.05	
7	Mônica Figueirêdo	Brazil	25.08	

==== Heat 3 ====
Wind: -0.1 m/s

Rank	Name	Nationality	Time	Notes
1	Marion Jones	United States	23.83	Q
2	Chen Yanchun	China	23.98	Q
3	Giada Gallina	Italy	24.17	Q
4	Debbie Ferguson	Bahamas	24.49	Q
5	Stephanie Young	New Zealand	24.75	
6	Monika Gachevska	Bulgaria	24.79	
7	Byun Yeong-Rye	South Korea	24.79	

==== Heat 4 ====
Wind: -0.6 m/s

Rank	Name	Nationality	Time	Notes
1	Hu Ling	China	23.18	Q
2	Zundra Feagin	United States	23.79	Q
3	Aline André	France	24.27	Q
4	Mireille Donders	Switzerland	24.34	Q
5	Lucimar Aparecida de Moura	Brazil	24.48	q
6	Colinda Farrar	Australia	24.50	
7	Meseret Bekele	Ethiopia	25.79	

==== Heat 5 ====
Wind: -0.5 m/s

Rank	Name	Nationality	Time	Notes
1	Cathy Freeman	Australia	23.49	Q
2	Silke Lichtenhagen	Germany	23.87	Q
3	Nicole Devonish	Canada	24.42	Q
4	Onyinye Chikezie	Nigeria	24.43	Q
5	Beverley Langley	Jamaica	24.49	q
6	Asako Mogi	Japan	24.81	

== Participation ==
According to an unofficial count, 35 athletes from 25 countries participated in the event.

- Australia (2)
- Bahamas (1)
- Brazil (2)
- Bulgaria (1)
- Canada (2)
- China (2)
- Commonwealth of Independent States (1)
- Ethiopia (1)
- France (1)
- Germany (2)
- Hong Kong (1)
- Italy (2)
- Jamaica (2)
- Japan (1)
- Netherlands (1)
- New Zealand (1)
- Nigeria (2)
- Poland (1)
- South Africa (1)
- South Korea (1)
- Sweden (1)
- Switzerland (1)
- Uganda (1)
- United Kingdom (2)
- United States (2)
