= 1992 World Junior Championships in Athletics – Women's 4 × 400 metres relay =

The women's 4x400 metres relay event at the 1992 World Junior Championships in Athletics was held in Seoul, South Korea, at Olympic Stadium on 19 and 20 September.

== Medalists ==
Gold	Georgeta Petrea; Mariana Florea; Ionela Tîrlea; Maria Magdalena Nedelcu; Romania
Silver	Debbie-Ann Parris; Catherine Scott; Ellen Grant; Claudine Williams; Jamaica
Bronze	Imke Köhler; Wiebke Steffen; Anita Oppong; Silvia Steimle; Germany

== Results ==
=== Final ===
20 September

Rank	Nation	Competitors	Time	Notes
1st place, gold medalist(s)	Romania	Georgeta Petrea; Mariana Florea; Ionela Tîrlea; Maria Magdalena Nedelcu	3:31.57	
2nd place, silver medalist(s)	Jamaica	Debbie-Ann Parris; Catherine Scott; Ellen Grant; Claudine Williams	3:32.68	
3rd place, bronze medalist(s)	Germany	Imke Köhler; Wiebke Steffen; Anita Oppong; Silvia Steimle	3:32.72	
4	United States	Monique Hennagan; Kathleen Travis; Cynthia Newsome; Jowanna McMullen	3:33.11	
5	Japan	Keiko Amano; Satomi Kasashima; Ikiko Yamagata; Kazue Kakinuma	3:34.83	
6	Australia	Amy Pedersen; Donna Adamson; Rachel Hale; Cathy Freeman	3:36.28	
7	Canada	Nicole Devonish; Camille Noel; Mame Twumasi; Erica Peterson	3:38.22	
8	Commonwealth of Independent States	Natalya Khrushchelyova; Irina Bezmenova; Yekaterina Leshchova; Olga Kagileva	3:39.76	

=== Heats ===
19 September

==== Heat 1 ====
Rank	Nation	Competitors	Time	Notes
1	Romania	Georgeta Petrea; Ionela Tîrlea; Mariana Florea; Maria Magdalena Nedelcu	3:36.91	Q
2	Japan	Keiko Amano; Ikiko Yamagata; Yumiko Tokuda; Satomi Kasashima	3:37.75	Q
3	Canada	Nicole Devonish; Camille Noel; Erica Peterson; Mame Twumasi	3:38.36	q
4	Commonwealth of Independent States	Olga Kagileva; Irina Bezmenova; Natalya Zaytseva; Natalya Khrushchelyova	3:39.01	q

==== Heat 2 ====
Rank	Nation	Competitors	Time	Notes
1	Jamaica	Debbie-Ann Parris; Winsome Cole; Ellen Grant; Claudine Williams	3:33.96	Q
2	United States	Monique Hennagan; Kathleen Travis; Cynthia Newsome; Jowanna McMullen	3:36.13	Q
3	Germany	Wiebke Steffen; Silvia Steimle; Andrea Bornscheuer; Imke Köhler	3:37.30	q
4	Australia	Amy Pedersen; Donna Adamson; Rachel Hale; Cathy Freeman	3:39.64	q
5	Czechoslovakia	Radka Lukavská; Andrea Šuldesová; Hana Benešová; Barbora Dostálová	3:42.02	
6	South Korea	Lee Eun-Ha; Kim Hae-Yeong; Yu Su-Hee; Byun Yeong-Rye	3:52.12	

== Participation ==
According to an unofficial count, 44 athletes from 10 countries participated in the event.

- Australia (4)
- Canada (4)
- Commonwealth of Independent States (5)
- Czechoslovakia (4)
- Germany (5)
- Jamaica (5)
- Japan (5)
- Romania (4)
- South Korea (4)
- United States (4)
