= 1990 World Junior Championships in Athletics – Women's 200 metres =

The women's 200 metres event at the 1990 World Junior Championships in Athletics was held in Plovdiv, Bulgaria, at Deveti Septemvri Stadium on 10 and 11 August.

== Medalists ==
Gold	Diane Smith; United Kingdom
Silver	Zundra Feagin; United States
Bronze	Lucrécia Jardim; Portugal

== Results ==
=== Final ===
11 August
Wind: +1.3 m/s

Rank	Name	Nationality	Time	Notes
1st place, gold medalist(s)	Diane Smith	United Kingdom	23.10	
2nd place, silver medalist(s)	Zundra Feagin	United States	23.13	
3rd place, bronze medalist(s)	Lucrécia Jardim	Portugal	23.26	
4	Revolie Campbell	Jamaica	23.42	
5	Cathy Freeman	Australia	23.61	
6	Chandra Sturrup	Bahamas	23.81	
7	Angela Burnham	United States	23.82	
8	Julia Duporty	Cuba	23.91	

=== Semifinals ===
10 August

==== Semifinal 1 ====
Wind: -0.9 m/s

Rank	Name	Nationality	Time	Notes
1	Diane Smith	United Kingdom	23.64	Q
2	Cathy Freeman	Australia	23.95	Q
3	Sanna Hernesniemi	Finland	24.02	
4	Gabi Rockmeier	West Germany	24.24	
5	Denisse Sharpe	Argentina	24.55	
6	Carla Popa	Romania	24.62	
7	Gabriella Szabó	Hungary	24.84	
	Fatima Yusuf	Nigeria	DQ	IAAF rule 162.7

==== Semifinal 2 ====
Wind: +0.5 m/s

Rank	Name	Nationality	Time	Notes
1	Revolie Campbell	Jamaica	23.36	Q
2	Lucrécia Jardim	Portugal	23.44	Q
3	Angela Burnham	United States	23.84	q
4	Melinda Gainsford	Australia	23.89	
5	Marissa Smith	Ireland	24.09	
6	Anja Böhme	West Germany	24.18	
7	Donna Fraser	United Kingdom	24.19	
8	Victoria Ljungberg	Sweden	24.24	

==== Semifinal 3 ====
Wind: +0.9 m/s

Rank	Name	Nationality	Time	Notes
1	Zundra Feagin	United States	23.66	Q
2	Chandra Sturrup	Bahamas	23.77	Q
3	Julia Duporty	Cuba	23.87	q
4	Monique Bogaards	Netherlands	24.08	
5	Katarzyna Zakrzewska	Poland	24.26	
6	Karen Clarke	Canada	24.49	
7	Nicoleta Filip	Romania	24.81	
8	Lisette Ferri	Spain	25.06	

=== Heats ===
10 August

==== Heat 1 ====
Wind: +0.4 m/s

Rank	Name	Nationality	Time	Notes
1	Revolie Campbell	Jamaica	23.51	Q
2	Karen Clarke	Canada	24.41	Q
3	Donna Fraser	United Kingdom	24.44	Q
4	Katarzyna Zakrzewska	Poland	24.57	q
5	Doris Auer	Austria	24.95	
6	Nadine Benoit	Mauritius	25.41	

==== Heat 2 ====
Wind: -0.4 m/s

Rank	Name	Nationality	Time	Notes
1	Zundra Feagin	United States	23.67	Q
2	Chandra Sturrup	Bahamas	23.93	Q
3	Nicoleta Filip	Romania	24.76	Q
4	Nadine Halliday	Canada	25.07	
5	Cristina Veiga	Spain	25.13	
6	Rosanna Browne	Anguilla	25.46	
7	Claudete Pina	Brazil	25.58	

==== Heat 3 ====
Wind: +0.3 m/s

Rank	Name	Nationality	Time	Notes
1	Angela Burnham	United States	24.05	Q
2	Cathy Freeman	Australia	24.19	Q
3	Gabi Rockmeier	West Germany	24.27	Q
4	Marissa Smith	Ireland	24.32	q
5	Denisse Sharpe	Argentina	24.37	q
6	Gabriella Szabó	Hungary	24.76	q
7	Georgia Paspalli	Cyprus	25.04	

==== Heat 4 ====
Wind: +0.7 m/s

Rank	Name	Nationality	Time	Notes
1	Lucrécia Jardim	Portugal	23.83	Q
2	Diane Smith	United Kingdom	23.93	Q
3	Anja Böhme	West Germany	24.20	Q
4	Monique Bogaards	Netherlands	24.34	q
5	Victoria Ljungberg	Sweden	24.50	q
6	Rosa Magaly Segovia	Colombia	25.00	
7	Stalo Konstantinou	Cyprus	25.21	

==== Heat 5 ====
Wind: +0.3 m/s

Rank	Name	Nationality	Time	Notes
1	Fatima Yusuf	Nigeria	23.44	Q
2	Sanna Hernesniemi	Finland	23.77	Q
3	Julia Duporty	Cuba	23.88	Q
4	Melinda Gainsford	Australia	23.92	q
5	Carla Popa	Romania	24.25	q
6	Lisette Ferri	Spain	24.90	q
7	Deirdre Caruana	Malta	26.33	

== Participation ==
According to an unofficial count, 34 athletes from 26 countries participated in the event.

- Anguilla (1)
- Argentina (1)
- Australia (2)
- Austria (1)
- Bahamas (1)
- Brazil (1)
- Canada (2)
- Colombia (1)
- Cuba (1)
- Cyprus (2)
- Finland (1)
- Hungary (1)
- Ireland (1)
- Jamaica (1)
- Malta (1)
- Mauritius (1)
- Netherlands (1)
- Nigeria (1)
- Poland (1)
- Portugal (1)
- Romania (2)
- Spain (2)
- Sweden (1)
- United Kingdom (2)
- United States (2)
- West Germany (2)
