= Katharine Merry =

English sprinter (born 1974)

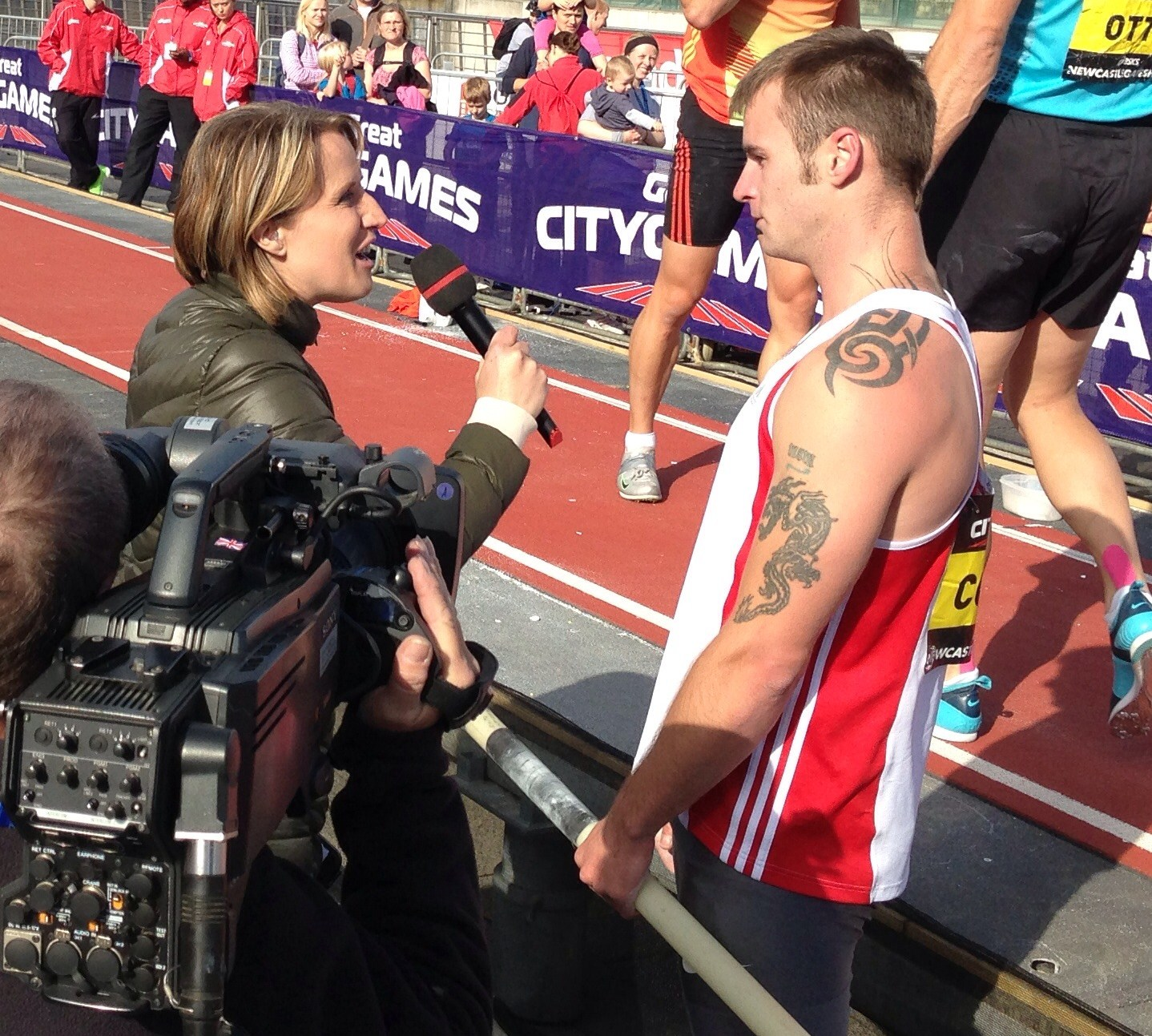
- Katharine Merry for BBC Sport interviewing British pole vaulter Luke Cutts at the 2013 Gateshead Great City Games vault

Personal information
- Nationality: British (English)
- Born: 21 September 1974 (age 51) Dunchurch, Warwickshire, England
- Height: 173 cm (5 ft 8 in)
- Weight: 62 kg (137 lb)

Sport
- Sport: Athletics
- Event: Sprints
- Club: Birchfield Harriers
- Coached by: Linford Christie
- Retired: 2005
Medal record
Women's Athletics
Representing Great Britain
Olympic Games
Bronze medal – third place	2000 Sydney	400 m
European Championships
Bronze medal – third place	1998 Budapest	4x400 m relay

Katharine Merry (born 21 September 1974) is an English former sprinter. She achieved the bronze medal in the 400 metres at the 2000 Sydney Olympics and was the fastest woman in the world over 400 m in 2001, with her career best of 49.59 seconds. She also represented Great Britain at the 1996 Atlanta Olympics and won the 200 metres at the 1993 European Junior Championships.

== Career ==
Born in Dunchurch, Warwickshire, Merry had a career that spanned 20 years. A member of the Birchfield Harriers athletics club, at the age of 12 she topped the UK Under 13 rankings in seven different events. She was the fastest girl in the world aged 14 years, and started her international GB career aged just 13, staying on the junior team for a record six years, winning five Junior Championships and a total of six medals. She became a successful senior athlete with her Olympic medal in Sydney in the "Race of the Games", achieving bronze behind the Australian favourite, Cathy Freeman, in front of 112,000 people at Stadium Australia.

The following year she became World number One. She was coached by fellow Olympic medallist Linford Christie in his Cardiff-based training squad, which included fellow Olympic medallist Darren Campbell. She is also with Christie's sports agency, Nuff Respect. Merry still holds various UK age-record bests, including U/13 high jump and several sprints, as well as the Senior UK Indoor 200 m record of 22.83 secs. She also holds World age-records, including 7.35 secs for 60 m indoors, when aged 14. She is third-fastest on the UK All Time 400 m list with a time of 49.59 seconds.

After suffering from a bone spur growth on her right heel bone, and two operations, Merry announced her official retirement from athletics in July 2005. She had been affected by the injury since 2001 and was struggling to get it fully healed. It had prevented her from resuming proper training, meaning she could not get back to her year 2000 form. Despite that, she still ended the 2001 season as the world's fastest female 400 m runner.

=== Post-athletics ===
Merry now works freelance in the media on radio and TV. She worked for the BBC Radio 5 Live at the Olympics in Beijing and London and the Commonwealth Games in Delhi and was the sole field event commentator for the Channel 4 coverage of the Paralympic Games in 2012. At the inaugural Invictus Games in 2014, Merry did live trackside interviews. For the Gold Coast 2018 Commonwealth Games, Merry was a television commentator for the BBC's coverage of athletic events. She also returned to 5 Live to commentate on the Paris 2024 Olympics. She has also worked for Sky TV, Eurosport and Channel Five. A multi-tasker, Merry now commentates, presents and hosts sporting events around the world.

Merry appeared on the BBC One gameshow All New Celebrity Total Wipeout on 25 September 2010, where she struck up a rivalry with John Regis, the man who, in her words, "ate all the pies". She "ran" the qualifier in 2:16, beating Regis by 50 seconds, and then beating him again in the next two rounds, but losing finally in the Wipeout Zone, finishing third behind Regis and eventual winner DJ JK. She won overall, 3 events to 1.

She is a regular on BBC Radio 5 Live's Fighting Talk and was a regular on BBC One's A Question of Sport. In December 2013, Merry came third out of four contestants on Celebrity Mastermind on BBC One. Her specialist subject was Aston Villa F.C. 1980–1990.

Merry was inducted into the England Athletics Hall of Fame in 2018.

At the 2020 Olympic Games in Tokyo, Merry became the first female in-stadium announcer at an Olympic Games.

In January 2024, Merry was named by Aston Villa as a member of the Honorary Anniversary Board ahead of the club's 150th anniversary season, as well as previously becoming an AVFC Foundation Ambassador.

== Personal life ==
Merry was based in Cardiff while training with Linford Christie, before moving to Bristol after retirement. Her son was born in February 2011 and her daughter in March 2014. The family lives in Birmingham, England.

== International competitions ==
Year	Competition	Venue	Position	Event	Notes
Representing the Great Britain
1989	European Junior Championships	Varaždin, Yugoslavia	7th	100 m	11.84
1989	European Junior Championships	Varaždin, Yugoslavia	5th	200 m	24.05
1990	World Junior Championships	Plovdiv, Bulgaria	8th	100m	11.71 (wind: +0.9 m/s)
1990	World Junior Championships	Plovdiv, Bulgaria	2nd	4 × 100 m relay	44.16
1991	European Junior Championships	Thessaloniki, Greece	3rd	200 m	23.84
1991	European Junior Championships	Thessaloniki, Greece	2nd	4 × 100 m relay	44.57
1992	World Junior Championships	Seoul, South Korea	6th	100m	11.63 (wind: +0.3 m/s)
1992	World Junior Championships	Seoul, South Korea	5th	200m	23.59 (wind: +0.3 m/s)
1992	World Junior Championships	Seoul, South Korea	4th	4 × 100 m relay	44.62
1993	European Junior Championships	San Sebastián, Spain	2nd	100 m	11.58
1993	European Junior Championships	San Sebastián, Spain	1st	200 m	23.35
1993	European Junior Championships	San Sebastián, Spain	1st	4 × 100 m relay	44.31
1993	World Championships	Stuttgart, Germany	22nd (qf)	200 m	23.46
1994	European Cup	Birmingham, United Kingdom	2nd	100 m	11.34
1994	European Cup	Birmingham, United Kingdom	2nd	200 m	23.38
1994	European Cup	Birmingham, United Kingdom	2nd	4 × 100 m relay	43.46
1994	European Championships	Helsinki, Finland	15th (sf)	200m	23.55 (wind: +0.3 m/s)
1994	European Championships	Helsinki, Finland	5th	4 × 100 m relay	43.63
1996	European Cup	Madrid, Spain	3rd	200 m	22.88
1996	Olympic Games	Atlanta, United States	19th (qf)	200 m	23.17
1996	Olympic Games	Atlanta, United States	8th	4 × 100 m relay	43.93
1997	World Championships	Athens, Greece	32nd (qf)	200 m	23.98
1998	European Championships	Budapest, Hungary	semifinal	200 m	23.38
1998	European Championships	Budapest, Hungary	3rd	4 × 400 m relay	3:25.66
1999	World Championships	Seville, Spain	5th	400 m	50.52
2000	Olympic Games	Sydney, Australia	3rd	400 m	49.72
2000	Olympic Games	Sydney, Australia	6th	4 × 400 m relay	2:25.67

== Personal bests ==
Event	Venue	Time	Date
60m (indoors)	Glasgow	7.34	23/01/94
100m	Birmingham	11.34 11.27w	25/06/94
200m	Barcelona	22.76 (−1.0w)	25/07/00
200m (indoors)	Birmingham	22.83	14/02/99
300m	Gateshead	36.00	28/08/00
400m	Athens	49.59	11/06/01
400m (indoors)	Birmingham	50.53	18/02/01

Preceded by Beverly Kinch	British Champion in 100 m 1994	Succeeded by Paula Thomas
Preceded by Allison Curbishley	British Champion in 400 m 1999	Succeeded by Donna Fraser
