= Athletics at the 1994 Commonwealth Games – Women's 200 metres =

Women's 200 metres at the Commonwealth Games

The women's 200 metres event at the 1994 Commonwealth Games was held on 25 and 26 August at the Centennial Stadium in Victoria, British Columbia.

== Medalists ==
Gold	Silver	Bronze
Cathy Freeman; Australia	Mary Onyali; Nigeria	Melinda Gainsford; Australia

== Results ==
=== Heats ===
Wind:
Heat 1: +1.2 m/s, Heat 2: +2.6 m/s, Heat 3: +2.2 m/s, Heat 4: +2.4 m/s

Rank	Heat	Name	Nationality	Time	Notes
1	4	Mary Onyali	Nigeria	22.69	Q
2	1	Cathy Freeman	Australia	22.83	Q
3	3	Pauline Davis	Bahamas	22.92	Q
4	2	Melinda Gainsford	Australia	22.97	Q
5	1	Dahlia Duhaney	Jamaica	23.03	Q
6	3	Paula Thomas	England	23.04	Q
7	4	Stacey Bowen	Canada	23.20	Q
8	2	Stephi Douglas	England	23.29	Q
9	2	Merlene Frazer	Jamaica	23.33	Q
10	1	Calister Ubah	Nigeria	23.45	Q
11	1	Geraldine McLeod	England	23.47	q
12	2	France Gareau	Canada	23.53	q
13	4	Debbie Ferguson	Bahamas	23.57	Q
14	3	Faith Idehen	Nigeria	23.59	Q
15	4	Heather Samuel	Antigua and Barbuda	23.60	q
16	4	Adri de Jongh	South Africa	23.64	q
17	3	Michelle Seymour	New Zealand	23.72	
18	1	Govindasamy Shanti	Malaysia	23.75	
19	3	Philomena Mensah	Ghana	23.79	
20	3	Theodora Kyriakou	Cyprus	23.83	
21	2	Hermin Joseph	Dominica	23.89	
22	4	Noami Mills	Ghana	24.02	
23	3	Ngozi Mwanamwambwa	Zambia	24.09	
24	2	Judith Boshoff	Namibia	24.20	
25	2	Doris Manu	Ghana	24.23	
26	1	Mame Twumasi	Canada	24.31	
	1	Aileen McGillivary	Scotland	DNS	

=== Semifinals ===
Wind:
Heat 1: +1.4 m/s, Heat 2: +2.7 m/s

Rank	Heat	Name	Nationality	Time	Notes
1	2	Mary Onyali	Nigeria	22.54	Q
2	1	Cathy Freeman	Australia	22.75	Q
3	1	Pauline Davis	Bahamas	22.88	Q
4	1	Paula Thomas	England	22.91	Q
5	2	Dahlia Duhaney	Jamaica	22.93	Q
6	2	Melinda Gainsford	Australia	22.96	Q
7	1	Merlene Frazer	Jamaica	23.32	Q
8	1	Stacey Bowen	Canada	23.35	
9	2	Geraldine McLeod	England	23.58	Q
10	2	Stephi Douglas	England	23.67	
11	1	Calister Ubah	Nigeria	23.68	
12	2	Debbie Ferguson	Bahamas	23.68	
13	2	Faith Idehen	Nigeria	23.68	
14	2	France Gareau	Canada	23.73	
15	1	Adri de Jongh	South Africa	24.03	
16	1	Heather Samuel	Antigua and Barbuda	24.11	

=== Final ===
Wind: +1.3 m/s

Rank	Lane	Name	Nationality	Time	Notes
1st place, gold medalist(s)	3	Cathy Freeman	Australia	22.25	GR
2nd place, silver medalist(s)	5	Mary Onyali	Nigeria	22.35	
3rd place, bronze medalist(s)	2	Melinda Gainsford	Australia	22.68	
4	7	Paula Thomas	England	22.69	
5	4	Pauline Davis	Bahamas	22.77	
6	6	Dahlia Duhaney	Jamaica	22.85	
7	8	Merlene Frazer	Jamaica	23.18	
8	1	Geraldine McLeod	England	23.52	
