= 1992 World Junior Championships in Athletics – Women's 100 metres =

The women's 100 metres event at the 1992 World Junior Championships in Athletics was held in Seoul, South Korea, at Olympic Stadium on 16 and 17 September.

== Medalists ==
Gold	Nikole Mitchell; Jamaica
Silver	Jacqueline Poelman; Netherlands
Bronze	Merlene Frazer; Jamaica

== Results ==
=== Final ===
17 September
Wind: +0.3 m/s

Rank	Name	Nationality	Time	Notes
1st place, gold medalist(s)	Nikole Mitchell	Jamaica	11.30	
2nd place, silver medalist(s)	Jacqueline Poelman	Netherlands	11.44	
3rd place, bronze medalist(s)	Merlene Frazer	Jamaica	11.49	
4	Irina Pukha	Commonwealth of Independent States	11.57	
5	Marion Jones	United States	11.58	
6	Katharine Merry	United Kingdom	11.63	
7	Donna Hoggarth	United Kingdom	11.69	
8	Giada Gallina	Italy	11.84	

=== Semifinals ===
17 September

==== Semifinal 1 ====
Wind: +1.2 m/s

Rank	Name	Nationality	Time	Notes
1	Nikole Mitchell	Jamaica	11.45	Q
2	Katharine Merry	United Kingdom	11.69	Q
3	Irina Pukha	Commonwealth of Independent States	11.71	Q
4	Giada Gallina	Italy	11.81	Q
5	Silke Lichtenhagen	Germany	11.84	
6	Christine Arron	France	11.85	
7	Kanae Ito	Japan	11.92	
8	Chen Shu-Chen	Chinese Taipei	11.99	

==== Semifinal 2 ====
Rank	Name	Nationality	Time	Notes
1	Jacqueline Poelman	Netherlands	11.61	Q
2	Merlene Frazer	Jamaica	11.68	Q
3	Marion Jones	United States	11.69	Q
4	Donna Hoggarth	United Kingdom	11.69	Q
5	Ndèye Binta Dia	Senegal	11.75	
6	Gabriele Becker	Germany	11.83	
7	Delphine Combe	France	11.87	
8	Onyinye Chikezie	Nigeria	11.92	

=== Quarterfinals ===
16 September

==== Quarterfinal 1 ====
Wind: +1.6 m/s

Rank	Name	Nationality	Time	Notes
1	Jacqueline Poelman	Netherlands	11.45	Q
2	Irina Pukha	Commonwealth of Independent States	11.58	Q
3	Onyinye Chikezie	Nigeria	11.70	Q
4	Gabriele Becker	Germany	11.73	Q
5	Dainelky Pérez	Cuba	11.90	
6	Lucimar Aparecida de Moura	Brazil	11.94	
7	Ekaterina Tosheva	Bulgaria	12.10	
8	Charlotta Vöcks	Sweden	12.17	

==== Quarterfinal 2 ====
Wind: +1.3 m/s

Rank	Name	Nationality	Time	Notes
1	Merlene Frazer	Jamaica	11.54	Q
2	Katharine Merry	United Kingdom	11.55	Q
3	Christine Arron	France	11.77	Q
4	Chen Shu-Chen	Chinese Taipei	11.88	Q
5	Benita Kelley	United States	11.92	
6	Linda Hansson	Sweden	11.95	
7	Tara Perry	Canada	11.99	
8	Calister Uba	Nigeria	12.21	

==== Quarterfinal 3 ====
Wind: +1.9 m/s

Rank	Name	Nationality	Time	Notes
1	Marion Jones	United States	11.47	Q
2	Silke Lichtenhagen	Germany	11.63	Q
3	Giada Gallina	Italy	11.67	Q
4	Delphine Combe	France	11.71	Q
5	Fiona Blair	Australia	11.90	
6	Katarzyna Zakrzewska	Poland	11.90	
7	Debbie Ferguson	Bahamas	11.92	
8	Noriko Masaki	Japan	12.19	

==== Quarterfinal 4 ====
Wind: +0.4 m/s

Rank	Name	Nationality	Time	Notes
1	Nikole Mitchell	Jamaica	11.32	Q
2	Donna Hoggarth	United Kingdom	11.61	Q
3	Ndèye Binta Dia	Senegal	11.71	Q
4	Kanae Ito	Japan	11.90	Q
5	Idalia Hechavarría	Cuba	11.95	
6	Marliese Steyn	South Africa	12.11	
7	Mireille Donders	Switzerland	12.12	
8	Sonia Paquette	Canada	12.18	

=== Heats ===
16 September

==== Heat 1 ====
Wind: +1.2 m/s

Rank	Name	Nationality	Time	Notes
1	Katharine Merry	United Kingdom	11.52	Q
2	Onyinye Chikezie	Nigeria	11.77	Q
3	Delphine Combe	France	11.79	Q
4	Chen Shu-Chen	Chinese Taipei	11.84	Q
5	Marliese Steyn	South Africa	11.93	q
6	Meseret Bekele	Ethiopia	12.76	

==== Heat 2 ====
Wind: +2.2 m/s

Rank	Name	Nationality	Time	Notes
1	Nikole Mitchell	Jamaica	11.28 w	Q
2	Irina Pukha	Commonwealth of Independent States	11.60 w	Q
3	Gabriele Becker	Germany	11.67 w	Q
4	Katarzyna Zakrzewska	Poland	11.85 w	Q
5	Dainelky Pérez	Cuba	11.92 w	q
6	Sonia Paquette	Canada	12.04 w	q
7	Noriko Masaki	Japan	12.10 w	q

==== Heat 3 ====
Wind: -0.9 m/s

Rank	Name	Nationality	Time	Notes
1	Merlene Frazer	Jamaica	11.67	Q
2	Christine Arron	France	11.80	Q
3	Idalia Hechavarría	Cuba	11.99	Q
4	Mireille Donders	Switzerland	12.16	Q
5	Zhang Chunying	China	12.22	
6	Colinda Farrar	Australia	12.22	
7	Lisette Rondón	Chile	12.31	

==== Heat 4 ====
Wind: +1.0 m/s

Rank	Name	Nationality	Time	Notes
1	Marion Jones	United States	11.55	Q
2	Ndèye Binta Dia	Senegal	11.64	Q
3	Giada Gallina	Italy	11.70	Q
4	Debbie Ferguson	Bahamas	11.92	Q
5	Tara Perry	Canada	11.98	q
6	Charlotta Vöcks	Sweden	12.07	q
7	Mônica Figueirêdo	Brazil	12.44	

==== Heat 5 ====
Wind: -0.2 m/s

Rank	Name	Nationality	Time	Notes
1	Jacqueline Poelman	Netherlands	11.50	Q
2	Donna Hoggarth	United Kingdom	11.69	Q
3	Kanae Ito	Japan	11.84	Q
4	Linda Hansson	Sweden	11.99	Q
5	Fiona Blair	Australia	12.01	q
6	Calister Uba	Nigeria	12.20	q
7	Wan Kin Yee	Hong Kong	12.68	

==== Heat 6 ====
Rank	Name	Nationality	Time	Notes
1	Silke Lichtenhagen	Germany	11.64	Q
2	Benita Kelley	United States	11.86	Q
3	Ekaterina Tosheva	Bulgaria	12.08	Q
4	Lucimar Aparecida de Moura	Brazil	12.09	Q
5	Monica Pirvu	Romania	12.25	
6	He Ling	China	12.28	

== Participation ==
According to an unofficial count, 40 athletes from 27 countries participated in the event.

- Australia (2)
- Bahamas (1)
- Brazil (2)
- Bulgaria (1)
- Canada (2)
- Chile (1)
- China (2)
- Chinese Taipei (1)
- Commonwealth of Independent States (1)
- Cuba (2)
- Ethiopia (1)
- France (2)
- Germany (2)
- Hong Kong (1)
- Italy (1)
- Jamaica (2)
- Japan (2)
- Netherlands (1)
- Nigeria (2)
- Poland (1)
- Romania (1)
- Senegal (1)
- South Africa (1)
- Sweden (2)
- Switzerland (1)
- United Kingdom (2)
- United States (2)
