= 1990 World Junior Championships in Athletics – Women's 4 × 100 metres relay =

The women's 4×100 metres relay event at the 1990 World Junior Championships in Athletics was held in Plovdiv, Bulgaria, at Deveti Septemvri Stadium on 11 and 12 August.

== Medalists ==
Gold	Gillian Russell; Revolie Campbell; Merlene Frazer; Nikole Mitchell; Jamaica
Silver	Annabel Soper; Diane Smith; Donna Fraser; Katharine Merry; United Kingdom
Bronze	Monifa Taylor; Tisha Prather; Angela Burnham; Zundra Feagin; United States

== Results ==
=== Final ===
12 August

Rank	Nation	Competitors	Time	Notes
1st place, gold medalist(s)	Jamaica	Gillian Russell; Revolie Campbell; Merlene Frazer; Nikole Mitchell	43.82	
2nd place, silver medalist(s)	United Kingdom	Annabel Soper; Diane Smith; Donna Fraser; Katharine Merry	44.16	
3rd place, bronze medalist(s)	United States	Monifa Taylor; Tisha Prather; Angela Burnham; Zundra Feagin	44.50	
4	Soviet Union	Dina Makarenko; Yana Burtasenkova; Yelena Dubtsova; Yelena Fyodorovich	44.86	
5	Australia	Rebecca Vormister; Melinda Gainsford; Cathy Freeman; Fiona Blair	45.01	
6	Bulgaria	Galina Dikova; Petya Pendareva; Desislava Dimitrova; Ilana Ivanova	45.64	
7	New Zealand	Briar Toop; Yvette McCausland; Anna Shattky; Heather Shanks	46.47	
	West Germany	Silke Lichtenhagen; Gabi Rockmeier; Birgit Rockmeier; Katja Seidel	DNF	

=== Heats ===
11 August

==== Heat 1 ====
Rank	Nation	Competitors	Time	Notes
1	West Germany	Silke Lichtenhagen; Gabi Rockmeier; Birgit Rockmeier; Katja Seidel	44.95	Q
2	United States	Monifa Taylor; Tisha Prather; Angela Burnham; Juliana Yendork	45.25	Q
3	Australia	Rebecca Vormister; Melinda Gainsford; Anne Minns; Fiona Blair	45.49	q
4	Bulgaria	Galina Dikova; Petya Pendareva; Desislava Dimitrova; Ilana Ivanova	45.64	q
5	Spain	Begoña Yúdice; Cristina Veiga; Alicia Valentin; Lisette Ferri	46.53	

==== Heat 2 ====
Rank	Nation	Competitors	Time	Notes
1	Jamaica	Gillian Russell; Revolie Campbell; Merlene Frazer; Nikole Mitchell	44.58	Q
2	United Kingdom	Annabel Soper; Diane Smith; Donna Fraser; Katharine Merry	44.71	Q
3	Soviet Union	Dina Makarenko; Larisa Dolmatova; Yelena Dubtsova; Yelena Fyodorovich	45.16	q
4	New Zealand	Briar Toop; Yvette McCausland; Anna Shattky; Heather Shanks	46.22	q
5	Austria	Ute Dallner; Dagmar Hölbl; Doris Auer; Elke Wölfling	46.59	

== Participation ==
According to an unofficial count, 43 athletes from 10 countries participated in the event.

- Australia (5)
- Austria (4)
- Bulgaria (4)
- Jamaica (4)
- New Zealand (4)
- Soviet Union (5)
- Spain (4)
- United Kingdom (4)
- United States (5)
- West Germany (4)
