= 1990 World Junior Championships in Athletics – Women's 100 metres =

The women's 100 metres event at the 1990 World Junior Championships in Athletics was held in Plovdiv, Bulgaria, at Deveti Septemvri Stadium on 8 and 9 August.

== Medalists ==
Gold	Andrea Philipp; East Germany
Silver	Nikole Mitchell; Jamaica
Bronze	Lucrécia Jardim; Portugal

== Results ==
=== Final ===
9 August
Wind: +0.9 m/s

Rank	Name	Nationality	Time	Notes
1st place, gold medalist(s)	Andrea Philipp	East Germany	11.36	
2nd place, silver medalist(s)	Nikole Mitchell	Jamaica	11.47	
3rd place, bronze medalist(s)	Lucrécia Jardim	Portugal	11.52	
4	Zundra Feagin	United States	11.55	
5	Merlene Frazer	Jamaica	11.64	
6	Diane Smith	United Kingdom	11.70	
6	Katja Seidel	West Germany	11.70	
8	Katharine Merry	United Kingdom	11.71	

=== Semifinals ===
9 August

==== Semifinal 1 ====
Wind: -1.3 m/s

Rank	Name	Nationality	Time	Notes
1	Zundra Feagin	United States	11.69	Q
2	Katharine Merry	United Kingdom	11.81	Q
3	Cathy Freeman	Australia	11.87	
4	Sanna Hernesniemi	Finland	11.96	
5	Briar Toop	New Zealand	11.97	
6	Victoria Ljungberg	Sweden	12.04	
7	Yelena Dubtsova	Soviet Union	12.10	
	Bernice Ferreira	Brazil	DNS	

==== Semifinal 2 ====
Wind: +1.1 m/s

Rank	Name	Nationality	Time	Notes
1	Lucrécia Jardim	Portugal	11.59	Q
2	Merlene Frazer	Jamaica	11.73	Q
3	Monique Bogaards	Netherlands	11.78	
4	Tisha Prather	United States	11.79	
5	Annie Claude Lafontaine	France	11.81	
6	Nadine Halliday	Canada	11.92	
7	Melinda Gainsford	Australia	11.93	
8	Petya Pendareva	Bulgaria	12.04	

==== Semifinal 3 ====
Wind: +1.0 m/s

Rank	Name	Nationality	Time	Notes
1	Andrea Philipp	East Germany	11.36	Q
2	Nikole Mitchell	Jamaica	11.37	Q
3	Katja Seidel	West Germany	11.56	q
4	Diane Smith	United Kingdom	11.61	q
5	Chandra Sturrup	Bahamas	11.62	
6	Carla Popa	Romania	11.80	
7	Yelena Fyodorovich	Soviet Union	11.81	
8	Gabriella Szabó	Hungary	11.88	

=== Heats ===
8 August

==== Heat 1 ====
Wind: -0.1 m/s

Rank	Name	Nationality	Time	Notes
1	Zundra Feagin	United States	11.59	Q
2	Nikole Mitchell	Jamaica	11.61	Q
3	Katharine Merry	United Kingdom	11.71	Q
4	Annie Claude Lafontaine	France	11.85	q
5	Melinda Gainsford	Australia	11.87	q
6	Georgia Paspalli	Cyprus	12.22	
7	Deirdre Caruana	Malta	13.08	

==== Heat 2 ====
Wind: -0.5 m/s

Rank	Name	Nationality	Time	Notes
1	Tisha Prather	United States	11.76	Q
2	Monique Bogaards	Netherlands	11.80	Q
3	Cathy Freeman	Australia	11.81	Q
4	Gabriella Szabó	Hungary	11.96	q
5	Petya Pendareva	Bulgaria	12.02	q
6	Sandrine Hennart	Belgium	12.18	
7	Stalo Konstantinou	Cyprus	12.29	
8	Nadine Benoit	Mauritius	12.40	

==== Heat 3 ====
Wind: -0.4 m/s

Rank	Name	Nationality	Time	Notes
1	Merlene Frazer	Jamaica	11.66	Q
2	Sanna Hernesniemi	Finland	11.77	Q
3	Carla Popa	Romania	11.89	Q
4	Yelena Fyodorovich	Soviet Union	11.91	q
5	Denisse Sharpe	Argentina	12.27	
6	Ute Dallner	Austria	12.28	
7	Rosanna Browne	Anguilla	12.46	

==== Heat 4 ====
Wind: -1.3 m/s

Rank	Name	Nationality	Time	Notes
1	Lucrécia Jardim	Portugal	11.60	Q
2	Andrea Philipp	East Germany	11.61	Q
3	Katja Seidel	West Germany	11.77	Q
4	Chandra Sturrup	Bahamas	11.79	q
5	Katarzyna Zakrzewska	Poland	12.33	
6	Begoña Yúdice	Spain	12.33	
7	Dagmar Hölbl	Austria	12.58	

==== Heat 5 ====
Wind: -0.2 m/s

Rank	Name	Nationality	Time	Notes
1	Diane Smith	United Kingdom	11.80	Q
2	Briar Toop	New Zealand	11.84	Q
3	Nadine Halliday	Canada	11.88	Q
4	Yelena Dubtsova	Soviet Union	11.90	q
5	Victoria Ljungberg	Sweden	11.91	q
6	Bernice Ferreira	Brazil	12.04	q
7	Gaby Baumann	West Germany	12.12	
8	Alicia Valentin	Spain	12.28	

== Participation ==
According to an unofficial count, 37 athletes from 28 countries participated in the event.

- Anguilla (1)
- Argentina (1)
- Australia (2)
- Austria (2)
- Bahamas (1)
- Belgium (1)
- Brazil (1)
- Bulgaria (1)
- Canada (1)
- Cyprus (2)
- East Germany (1)
- Finland (1)
- France (1)
- Hungary (1)
- Jamaica (2)
- Malta (1)
- Mauritius (1)
- Netherlands (1)
- New Zealand (1)
- Poland (1)
- Portugal (1)
- Romania (1)
- Soviet Union (2)
- Spain (2)
- Sweden (1)
- United Kingdom (2)
- United States (2)
- West Germany (2)
