= 1992 World Junior Championships in Athletics – Women's 400 metres =

The women's 400 metres event at the 1992 World Junior Championships in Athletics was held in Seoul, South Korea, at Olympic Stadium on 16, 17 and 18 September.

== Medalists ==
Gold	Maria Magdalena Nedelcu; Romania
Silver	Claudine Williams; Jamaica
Bronze	Ionela Tîrlea; Romania

== Results ==
=== Final ===
18 September

Rank	Name	Nationality	Time	Notes
1st place, gold medalist(s)	Maria Magdalena Nedelcu	Romania	51.84	
2nd place, silver medalist(s)	Claudine Williams	Jamaica	52.03	
3rd place, bronze medalist(s)	Ionela Tîrlea	Romania	52.13	
4	Camille Noel	Canada	52.98	
5	Hana Benešová	Czechoslovakia	53.39	
6	Kazue Kakinuma	Japan	53.45	
7	Imke Köhler	Germany	53.73	
8	Bai Xiaoyun	China	54.30	

=== Semifinals ===
17 September

==== Semifinal 1 ====
Rank	Name	Nationality	Time	Notes
1	Claudine Williams	Jamaica	52.88	Q
2	Ionela Tîrlea	Romania	52.90	Q
3	Imke Köhler	Germany	53.44	Q
4	Bai Xiaoyun	China	54.26	Q
5	Monique Hennagan	United States	54.27	
6	Rachel Hale	Australia	55.27	
7	Barbora Dostálová	Czechoslovakia	55.55	
	Rabia Abdul Salam	Malaysia	DNS	

==== Semifinal 2 ====
Rank	Name	Nationality	Time	Notes
1	Maria Magdalena Nedelcu	Romania	52.87	Q
2	Camille Noel	Canada	53.26	Q
3	Hana Benešová	Czechoslovakia	53.58	Q
4	Kazue Kakinuma	Japan	53.81	Q
5	Catherine Scott	Jamaica	53.91	
6	Hsu Pei-Chin	Chinese Taipei	54.69	
7	Donna Adamson	Australia	55.17	
8	Sharon Lev	Israel	55.91	

=== Heats ===
16 September

==== Heat 1 ====
Rank	Name	Nationality	Time	Notes
1	Camille Noel	Canada	53.20	Q
2	Catherine Scott	Jamaica	54.55	Q
3	Hana Benešová	Czechoslovakia	54.71	Q
4	Donna Adamson	Australia	54.91	q
5	Sharon Lev	Israel	55.44	q
6	Keiko Amano	Japan	55.61	

==== Heat 2 ====
Rank	Name	Nationality	Time	Notes
1	Ionela Tîrlea	Romania	53.49	Q
2	Kazue Kakinuma	Japan	53.92	Q
3	Hsu Pei-Chin	Chinese Taipei	55.03	Q
4	Patrizia Spuri	Italy	55.85	
5	Cynthia Newsome	United States	56.07	
	Yana Burtasenkova	Commonwealth of Independent States	DNF	

==== Heat 3 ====
Rank	Name	Nationality	Time	Notes
1	Claudine Williams	Jamaica	53.53	Q
2	Bai Xiaoyun	China	54.50	Q
3	Imke Köhler	Germany	54.83	Q
4	Barbora Dostálová	Czechoslovakia	55.45	q
5	Helen Frost	United Kingdom	55.94	
6	Grace Birungi	Uganda	56.10	

==== Heat 4 ====
Rank	Name	Nationality	Time	Notes
1	Maria Magdalena Nedelcu	Romania	53.65	Q
2	Monique Hennagan	United States	54.19	Q
3	Rachel Hale	Australia	54.78	Q
4	Rabia Abdul Salam	Malaysia	54.91	q
5	Saidat Onanuga	Nigeria	55.61	
6	Zhang Hengyun	China	56.06	

== Participation ==
According to an unofficial count, 24 athletes from 17 countries participated in the event.

- Australia (2)
- Canada (1)
- China (2)
- Chinese Taipei (1)
- Commonwealth of Independent States (1)
- Czechoslovakia (2)
- Germany (1)
- Israel (1)
- Italy (1)
- Jamaica (2)
- Japan (2)
- Malaysia (1)
- Nigeria (1)
- Romania (2)
- Uganda (1)
- United Kingdom (1)
- United States (2)
