= Bai Xiaoyun =

Chinese sprinter (born 1973)

Bai Xiaoyun (born 15 June 1973), is a retired Chinese sprinter who specialized in the 400 metres.

She is the current Asian record holder in the 4 x 400 metres relay in a time of 3:24.28 seconds, achieved in September 1993 in Beijing with Cao Chunying, An Xiaohong and Ma Yuqin.

== Achievements ==
Year	Competition	Venue	Position	Event	Notes
Representing China
1992	World Junior Championships	Seoul, Korea	8th	400 m	54.30
1993	Chinese National Games	Beijing, China	6th	400 m	52.07
1993	Chinese National Games	Beijing, China	1st	4 × 400 m	3:24.28
