= Mame Twumasi =

Canadian sprinter (born 1975)

Personal information
- Born: 26 June 1975 (age 51)

Sport
- Country: Canada
- Sport: Athletics
- Events: 100 metres 200 metres

Achievements and titles
- Personal bests: 100 m: 11.65 (1993); 200 m: 23.73
Medal record
Women's athletics
Representing Canada
World Indoor Championships
Silver medal – second place	1993 Toronto	Medley relay
Canada Summer Games
Silver medal – second place	1993 Kamloops	100 m
Gold medal – first place	1993 Kamloops	200 m
Gold medal – first place	1993 Kamloops	4 × 400 m relay

Mame Twumasi (born 26 June 1975) is a Canadian former sprinter. She won Canada Summer Games gold medals in the 200 m and 4 × 400 m relay. At the 1993 IAAF World Indoor Championships, Twumasi won the silver medal in the sprint medley relay demonstration event.

== Career ==
Twumasi competed in both track and field and gymnastics, beginning the latter in 1985. She also played volleyball. In track, Twumasi began representing Calgary Spartans of Calgary, Alberta, in 1989. Competing in sprints and hurdles, she was a nominee for the 1990 Athletics Alberta awards. She ran 12.11 over 100 m in 1991 aged 15. At the 1991 Canadian U20 Track and Field Championships, Twumasi was 3rd and 2nd in the 100 m and 200 m respectively, qualifying for the Canadian team at the 1991 Pan American Junior Athletics Championships.

Twumasi competed in the 1992 Knights of Columbus Indoor Games, where she was named the non-invitational athlete of the meet. At the 1992 Canadian Indoor Athletics Championships, Twumasi was second to Karen Clarke in the 200 m. It was at this time that Twumasi decided to focus on track over gymnastics, citing the early age required to succeed as a gymnast. In June 1992, Twumasi ran the 1992 World U20 Championships 200 m standard of 24.28 seconds. She also qualified for the 4 × 100 m and 4 × 400 m relays. She advanced past the 200 m heats but finished 7th in her semi-final; her 4 × 100 m relay was eliminated in the semi-finals but her Canadian 4 × 400 m team made the finals and finished 7th.

In February 1993, Twumasi finished 3rd in the 200 m at the Canadian Indoor Athletics Championships. She was selected to compete on the Canadian team at the 1993 IAAF World Indoor Championships in the sprint medley relay, a new exhibition event. She ran a 24.2 200 m split on the 3rd leg, contributing to Canada's 3rd-place finish behind the United States and Russia – a placing later changed to 2nd after Russia was disqualified. Outdoors, Twumasi traveled to Tokyo to compete in the 200 m at the Japanese Athletics Championships as an invited foreign guest. At the 1993 Canadian Track and Field Championships, Twumasi competed representing Calgary International Track Club. She was pre-selected for the 1993 Canada Games based on past performance. At the Games, she won the silver medal in the 100 m with an 11.65-second personal best clocking. She came back to win gold in the 200 m, though her mark in that event was slower than her 23.73 best. She also anchored the Calgary 4 × 400 m team to a second gold medal.

Twumasi won the 200 m at the 1994 Canadian U20 Track and Field Championships, her second title after also winning the 200 m at the 1992 edition. She competed at a Canada-USA dual meet in Buffalo, New York, and had qualified to represent Canada at the 1994 World U20 Championships, but she had to pay CAD$2,000 (equivalent to $3,832 in 2025) for her trip as she was not fast enough to have travel covered by Athletics Canada. Running the same four events as her previous World U20 appearance, Twumasi advanced past the heats in the 100 m but finished 7th in her quarter-final, and was 7th in her 200 m first round. In the relays, Twumasi's team did not finish their 4 × 100 m heat and was 7th in their 4 × 400 m heat. Though Twumasi finished 4th in the 200 m trials to make Canada's 1994 Commonwealth Games team, an athlete ahead of her had already qualified in another event, opening up a spot for Twumasi. In the 200 m, Twumasi ran 24.31 seconds to place 6th in her heat and did not advance. She ended the season winning the 1994 Athletics Alberta award for juniors.

Twumasi began competing for the UCLA Bruins track and field team in 1995. She won the 400 m at the 1996 UCLA–Cal State Northridge–Houston–UC Irvine quadrangle. Later that season, she attempted to make the Canadian 1996 Olympic team in the 200 metres and 400 metres.

Over the following years, she competed on UCLA's 4 × 100 m relay and 4 × 400 m relay teams. She competed in the individual 200 m at the 1998 Pac-10 Conference outdoor championships, placing 6th in her heat.

== Personal life ==
Twumasi was born 26 June 1975. She is from Calgary where she attended Saint Francis High School in the northwest of the city. Beginning in 1995, she attended the University of California, Los Angeles.

She was coached by John Cannon of the Calgary Spartans. In 1996, Twumasi was named a winner of the Calgary Herald's Black Achievement Awards.
