= Gabi Rockmeier =

German sprinter

Personal information
- Full name: Gabriele Rockmeier
- Born: 29 November 1973 (age 52) Moosburg a.d. Isar, West Germany
- Height: 1.76 m (5 ft 9 in)

Sport
- Country: Germany
- Sport: Athletics
- Event(s): 100 metres, 200 metres

Achievements and titles
- Personal bests: 60 metres: 7.20 (Chemnitz; February 2003); 100 metres: 11.17 (Stuttgart; June 2001); 200 metres: 22.68 (Stuttgart; July 2001)
Medal record
Women's athletics
Representing Germany
European Championships
Silver medal – second place	1998 Budapest	4×100 m

Gabriele ("Gabi") Rockmeier (born 29 November 1973 in Moosburg a.d. Isar) is a former German sprinter who specialised in the 100 and 200 metres.

Her personal best time is 22.68 seconds, achieved in July 2001 in Stuttgart.

She is the twin sister of Birgit Rockmeier.

== Achievements ==
Year	Competition	Venue	Position	Event	Notes
Representing West Germany
1990	World Junior Championships	Plovdiv, Bulgaria	15th (sf)	200 m	24.24 (wind: -0.9 m/s)
1990	World Junior Championships	Plovdiv, Bulgaria	3rd (h)	4 × 100 m relay	44.95
Representing Germany
1991	European Junior Championships	Thessaloniki, Greece	1st	4 × 100 m relay	44.46
1992	World Junior Championships	Seoul, South Korea	3rd	4 × 100 m relay	44.52
1998	European Championships	Budapest, Hungary	7th	200 m	23.08
1998	European Championships	Budapest, Hungary	2nd	4 × 100 m relay	42.68
1998	World Cup	Johannesburg, South Africa	3rd	4 × 100 m relay	42.81
2000	Olympic Games	Sydney, Australia	6th	4 × 100 m relay	43.11
2001	World Championships	Edmonton, Canada	1st	4 × 100 m relay	42.32
2002	European Indoor Championships	Vienna, Austria	3rd	200 m	23.05
2002	European Championships	Munich, Germany	5th	200 m	23.00
2002	European Championships	Munich, Germany	2nd	4 × 100 m relay	42.54
2002	World Cup	Madrid, Spain	7th	200 m	23.67
2002	World Cup	Madrid, Spain	5th	4 × 100 m relay	43.36
