= Camille Noel =

Canadian sprinter (born 1974)

Personal information
- Full name: Camille Anise Noel
- Nationality: Canadian
- Born: 14 April 1974 (age 51) Vancouver, British Columbia, Canada

Sport
- Sport: Sprinting
- Event: 4 × 400 metres relay

Camille Anise Noel (born 14 April 1974) is a Canadian sprinter who specialized in the 400 metres.

As a junior she competed without finishing at the 1990 World Junior Championships and finished fourth at the 1992 World Junior Championships. In the relay she finished seventh in the 4 × 400 metres relay and competed in the 4 × 100 metres relay, both at the 1992 World Junior Championships.

In the same year she finished fourth in the women's 4 × 400 metres relay at the 1992 Summer Olympics. At the 1993 World Championships she competed without reaching the final in the 400 metres and in the 4 × 100 metres relay.

Noel was a two-time All-American sprinter for the UCLA Bruins track and field team, finishing 4th in the 4 × 400 meters relay at the 1995 NCAA Division I Outdoor Track and Field Championships.
