= Silke Lichtenhagen =

German sprinter

Medal record

Women's athletics

Representing Germany

European Championships
Gold medal – first place	1994 Helsinki	4×100 m

Silke Lichtenhagen (born 20 November 1973 in Leverkusen) is a retired German sprinter.

She competed for TSV Bayer Leverkusen, training under Manfred Fink (1988–1994) and Wolfgang Thiele (1995–1998). She represented Germany at the 1996 Atlanta Olympics.

== Achievements ==
Year	Competition	Venue	Position	Event	Notes
Representing West Germany
1990	World Junior Championships	Plovdiv, Bulgaria	3rd (h)	4 × 100 m relay	44.95
Representing Germany
1991	European Junior Championships	Thessaloniki, Greece	6th	100 m	11.77
1991	European Junior Championships	Thessaloniki, Greece	1st	4 × 100 m relay	44.46
1992	World Junior Championships	Seoul, South Korea	11th (sf)	100m	11.84 (wind: +1.2 m/s)
1992	World Junior Championships	Seoul, South Korea	8th	200m	24.22 (wind: +0.3 m/s)
1992	World Junior Championships	Seoul, South Korea	3rd	4 × 100 m relay	44.52
1994	European Championships	Helsinki, Finland	12th (sf)	200m	23.45 (wind: +1.4 m/s)
1994	European Championships	Helsinki, Finland	1st	4 × 100 m relay	42.90
1995	World Indoor Championships	Barcelona, Spain	4th	200 m	23.23
1995	World Championships	Gothenburg, Sweden	3rd	4 × 100 m relay	43.01

=== Personal bests ===
- 60 m: 7.23 s (1997)
- 100 m: 11.24 s (1996)
- 200 m: 22.73 s (1994)
