= Birgit Rockmeier =

German sprinter

Personal information
- Born: 29 November 1973 (age 52) Moosburg an der Isar, West Germany
- Height: 1.75 m (5 ft 9 in)

Sport
- Country: Germany
- Sport: Athletics
- Event(s): 100 m, 200 m, 400 m

Achievements and titles
- Personal bests: 60 metres: 7.34 (Halle/Saale; January 1999); 100 metres: 11.33 (Bochum; July 2005); 200 metres: 22.90 (Stuttgart; July 2001); 400 metres: 51.45 (Dortmund; July 2000)
Medal record
Women's athletics
Representing Germany
European Championships
Silver medal – second place	1998 Budapest	4×100 m

Birgit Rockmeier (born 29 November 1973) is a German former sprinter who specialised in the 200 metres.

Rockmeier's personal best time is 22.90 seconds, achieved in July 2001 in Stuttgart. She represented the sports club LG Olympia Dortmund and is the twin sister of Gabi Rockmeier.

== Achievements ==
Year	Competition	Venue	Position	Event	Notes
Representing West Germany
1990	World Junior Championships	Plovdiv, Bulgaria	3rd (h)	4 × 100 m relay	44.95
Representing Germany
1991	European Junior Championships	Thessaloniki, Greece	1st	4 × 100 m relay	44.46
1992	World Junior Championships	Seoul, South Korea	3rd	4 × 100 m relay	44.52
1994	European Championships	Helsinki, Finland	20th (h)	200 m	23.89 (wind: -0.3 m/s)
1997	World Championships	Athens, Greece	4th	4 × 100 m relay	42.44
1998	European Indoor Championships	Valencia, Spain	4th	200 m	23.24
1998	European Championships	Munich, Germany	2nd	4 × 100 m relay	42.68
1998	World Cup	Johannesburg, South Africa	3rd	4 × 100 m relay	42.81
1999	World Indoor Championships	Maebashi, Japan	6th	200 m	23.74
2000	European Indoor Championships	Ghent, Belgium	4th	200 m	23.29
2001	World Indoor Championships	Lisbon, Portugal	3rd	4 × 400 m relay	3:31.00
2001	World Championships	Edmonton, Canada	1st	4 × 100 m relay	42.32
2002	European Championships	Munich, Germany	8th	400 m	52.91
2002	European Championships	Munich, Germany	1st	4 × 400 m relay	3:25.10
2002	World Cup	Madrid, Spain	5th	4 × 100 m relay	43.36
2002	World Cup	Madrid, Spain	6th	4 × 400 m relay	3:31.09
2003	World Championships	Paris, France	4th	4 × 400 m relay	3:26.25
