= 1999 IAAF World Indoor Championships – Women's 4 × 400 metres relay =

The women's 4 × 400 metres relay event at the 1999 IAAF World Indoor Championships was held on March 7.

== Results ==
Rank	Nation	Competitors	Time	Notes
1st place, gold medalist(s)	Russia	Tatyana Chebykina, Svetlana Goncharenko, Olga Kotlyarova, Natalya Nazarova	3:24.25	WR
2nd place, silver medalist(s)	Australia	Susan Andrews, Tania van Heer, Tamsyn Lewis, Cathy Freeman	3:26.87	AR
3rd place, bronze medalist(s)	United States	Monique Hennagan, Michele Collins, Zundra Feagin-Alexander, Shanelle Porter	3:27.59	AR
4	Germany	Anja Knippel, Anja Rücker, Ulrike Urbansky, Grit Breuer	3:29.06	
5	Jamaica	Lorraine Graham, Deon Hemmings, Beverly Grant, Sandie Richards	3:30.16	NR
6	Japan	Sachiko Kiso, Sakie Nobuoka, Miho Sugimori, Mariko Miura	3:41.47	
