= Nikole Mitchell =

Jamaican sprinter (born 1974)

Medal record

Representing Jamaica

Athletics

Central American and Caribbean Games
| Bronze medal – third place | 1993 Ponce | 4x100 m relay |

World Championships
| Bronze medal – third place | 1993 Stuttgart | 4x100 m relay |

Olympic Games
| Bronze medal – third place | 1996 Atlanta | 4x100 m relay |

Nikole Alangia Mitchell (also spelled Nicole; born 5 June 1974) is a retired Jamaican sprinter who specialized in the 100 metres. She also competed on the successful Jamaican team in the 4 x 100 metres relay, winning gold medals at the World Junior Championships and an Olympic bronze medal in 1996.

Mitchell competed for the Georgetown Hoyas track and field team in the NCAA.

In 1993, she was awarded the Austin Sealy Trophy for the most outstanding athlete of the 1993 CARIFTA Games.

Her personal best time for 100 metres was 11.18 seconds, achieved in July 1993 in Kingston. She attended St. Mary's high school and she was routinely the best athlete, doing well in the 100m and 200m.

== International competitions ==
| Year | Competition | Venue | Position | Event | Notes |
Representing Jamaica
| 1990 | CARIFTA Games (U-17) | Kingston, Jamaica | 1st | 100 m | 11.77 (1.9 m/s) |
| 1990 | CARIFTA Games (U-17) | Kingston, Jamaica | 1st | 200 m | 24.30 w (3.4 m/s) |
| 1990 | CARIFTA Games (U-20) | Kingston, Jamaica | 1st | 4 × 100 m relay | 45.39 |
| 1990 | Central American and Caribbean Junior Championships (U-17) | Havana, Cuba | 1st | 100 m | 11.88 (0.2 m/s) |
| 1990 | Central American and Caribbean Junior Championships (U-17) | Havana, Cuba | 1st | 4 × 100 m relay | 46.66 |
| 1990 | World Junior Championships | Plovdiv, Bulgaria | 2nd | 100m | 11.47 (wind: +0.9 m/s) |
| 1990 | World Junior Championships | Plovdiv, Bulgaria | 1st | 4 × 100 m relay | 43.82 |
| 1991 | CARIFTA Games (U-20) | Port of Spain, Trinidad and Tobago | 1st | 100 m | 11.40 (1.7 m/s) |
| 1991 | CARIFTA Games (U-20) | Port of Spain, Trinidad and Tobago | 1st | 200 m | 23.48 |
| 1992 | World Junior Championships | Seoul, South Korea | 1st | 100m | 11.30 (wind: +0.3 m/s) |
| 1992 | World Junior Championships | Seoul, South Korea | 1st | 4 × 100 m relay | 43.96 |
| 1993 | CARIFTA Games (U-20) | Fort-de-France, Martinique | 1st | 100 m | 11.43 (0.3 m/s) |
| 1993 | CARIFTA Games (U-20) | Fort-de-France, Martinique | 1st | 200 m | 23.25 (-1.2 m/s) |
| 1993 | CARIFTA Games (U-20) | Fort-de-France, Martinique | 1st | 4 × 100 m relay | 45.23 |
| 1993 | World Championships | Stuttgart, Germany | 7th | 100 m | 11.20 (-0.3 m/s) |
| 1993 | World Championships | Stuttgart, Germany | 3rd | 4 × 100 m relay | 41.94 |
| 1993 | Central American and Caribbean Games | Ponce, Puerto Rico | 4th | 200 m | 23.92 |
| 1993 | Central American and Caribbean Games | Ponce, Puerto Rico | 3rd | 4 × 100 m relay | 45.75 |
| 1996 | Olympic Games | Atlanta, United States | 3rd | 4 × 100 m relay | 42.24 |
