= Merlene Frazer =

Jamaican sprinter

Personal information
- Born: 27 December 1973 (age 52) Trelawny, Jamaica

Sport
- Sport: Track and field
- Club: Texas Longhorns
Medal record
Representing Jamaica
Olympic Games
Silver medal – second place	2000 Sydney	4 × 100 m relay
World Championships
Gold medal – first place	1991 Tokyo	4 × 100 m relay
Silver medal – second place	1997 Athens	4 × 100 m relay
Bronze medal – third place	1999 Seville	200 m
Bronze medal – third place	1999 Seville	4 × 100 m relay
Bronze medal – third place	2001 Edmonton	4 × 100 m relay
Pan American Games
Gold medal – first place	1991 Havana	4 x 100m relay
Bronze medal – third place	1991 Havana	200m

Merlene Frazer (born 27 December 1973) is a retired female track and field sprinter from Jamaica who specialized in the 200 metres. In the 4 × 100 metres relay, she won a World Championship gold medal in 1991 and an Olympic silver medal in 2000. On both occasions, she ran in the preliminary rounds but not the final. Her biggest individual success was winning a World Championship bronze medal at 200 metres in 1997.

As part of the Jamaican 4 × 100 relay squad in 1991, she is the youngest World Champion ever.

Running for the Texas Longhorns track and field team, Frazer won the 1994 200 meters at the NCAA Division I Outdoor Track and Field Championships and won two indoor titles as well. She was inducted into the Texas sports hall of fame in 2017. Before competing for Texas, Frazier was an NJCAA national champion for San Jacinto College.

== Achievements ==
Year	Competition	Venue	Position	Event	Notes
Representing Jamaica
1988	Central American and Caribbean Junior Championships (U-17)	Nassau, Bahamas	6th	Long jump	
1988	Central American and Caribbean Junior Championships (U-17)	Nassau, Bahamas	1st	4 × 100 m relay	46.75
1989	CARIFTA Games (U-17)	Bridgetown, Barbados	2nd	100 m	11.93
1989	CARIFTA Games (U-17)	Bridgetown, Barbados	2nd	200 m	25.0
1989	CARIFTA Games (U-17)	Bridgetown, Barbados	2nd	Long jump	5.81 m
1990	CARIFTA Games (U-20)	Kingston, Jamaica	2nd	100 m	11.75 (1.3 m/s)
1990	CARIFTA Games (U-20)	Kingston, Jamaica	2nd	200 m	23.89 (-0.2 m/s)
1990	CARIFTA Games (U-20)	Kingston, Jamaica	1st	4 × 100 m relay	45.39
1990	World Junior Championships	Plovdiv, Bulgaria	5th	100 m	11.64 (wind: +0.9 m/s)
1990	World Junior Championships	Plovdiv, Bulgaria	1st	4 × 100 m relay	43.82
1991	CARIFTA Games (U-20)	Port of Spain, Trinidad and Tobago	3rd	100 m	11.74 (1.7 m/s)
1991	CARIFTA Games (U-20)	Port of Spain, Trinidad and Tobago	2nd	200 m	23.86
1991	Central American and Caribbean Championships	Xalapa, Mexico	1st	200 m	23.63
1991	Central American and Caribbean Championships	Xalapa, Mexico	1st	4 × 100 m relay	44.54
1991	Pan American Games	Havana, Cuba	3rd	200 m	23.48
1991	Pan American Games	Havana, Cuba	1st	4 × 100 m relay	43.79
1991	World Championships	Tokyo, Japan	1st	4 × 100 m	41.94^
1992	World Junior Championships	Seoul, South Korea	3rd	100 m	11.49 (wind: +0.3 m/s)
1992	World Junior Championships	Seoul, South Korea	3rd	200 m	23.29 (wind: +0.3 m/s)
1992	World Junior Championships	Seoul, South Korea	1st	4 × 100 m relay	43.96
1994	Commonwealth Games	Victoria, Canada	7th	200 m	23.18
1994	Commonwealth Games	Victoria, Canada	4th	4 × 400 m relay	43.51
1995	World Championships	Gothenburg, Sweden	32nd (h)	400 m	52.24
1995	World Championships	Gothenburg, Sweden	—	4 × 400 m relay	DQ
1996	Olympic Games	Atlanta, United States	12th (sf)	400 m	51.18
1996	Olympic Games	Atlanta, United States	4th	4 × 400 m relay	3:21.69
1997	World Indoor Championships	Paris, France	4th	200 m	22.88
1997	World Championships	Athens, Greece	10th (sf)	200 m	22.81 (-2.3 m/s)
1997	World Championships	Athens, Greece	2nd	4 × 100 m relay	42.10 SB
1999	World Championships	Seville, Spain	3rd	200 m	22.26 (0.6 m/s)
1999	World Championships	Seville, Spain	3rd	4 × 100 m relay	42.15 SB
2000	Olympic Games	Sydney, Australia	2nd	4 × 100 m relay	42.13^
2001	World Championships	Edmonton, Canada	3rd	4 × 100 m relay	42.40 SB

Notes:
- ^ At both the 1991 World Championships and the 2000 Olympic Games, Frazer ran in the preliminary rounds of the 4 × 100 m relay but not in the final.
- (#) Indicates overall position in qualifying heats (h) or semifinals (sf).

=== Personal bests ===
- 100 metres - 11.20 s (1995)
- 200 metres - 22.18 s (1999)
- 400 metres - 51.18 s (1996)
