= Marion Jones =

American athlete (born 1975)

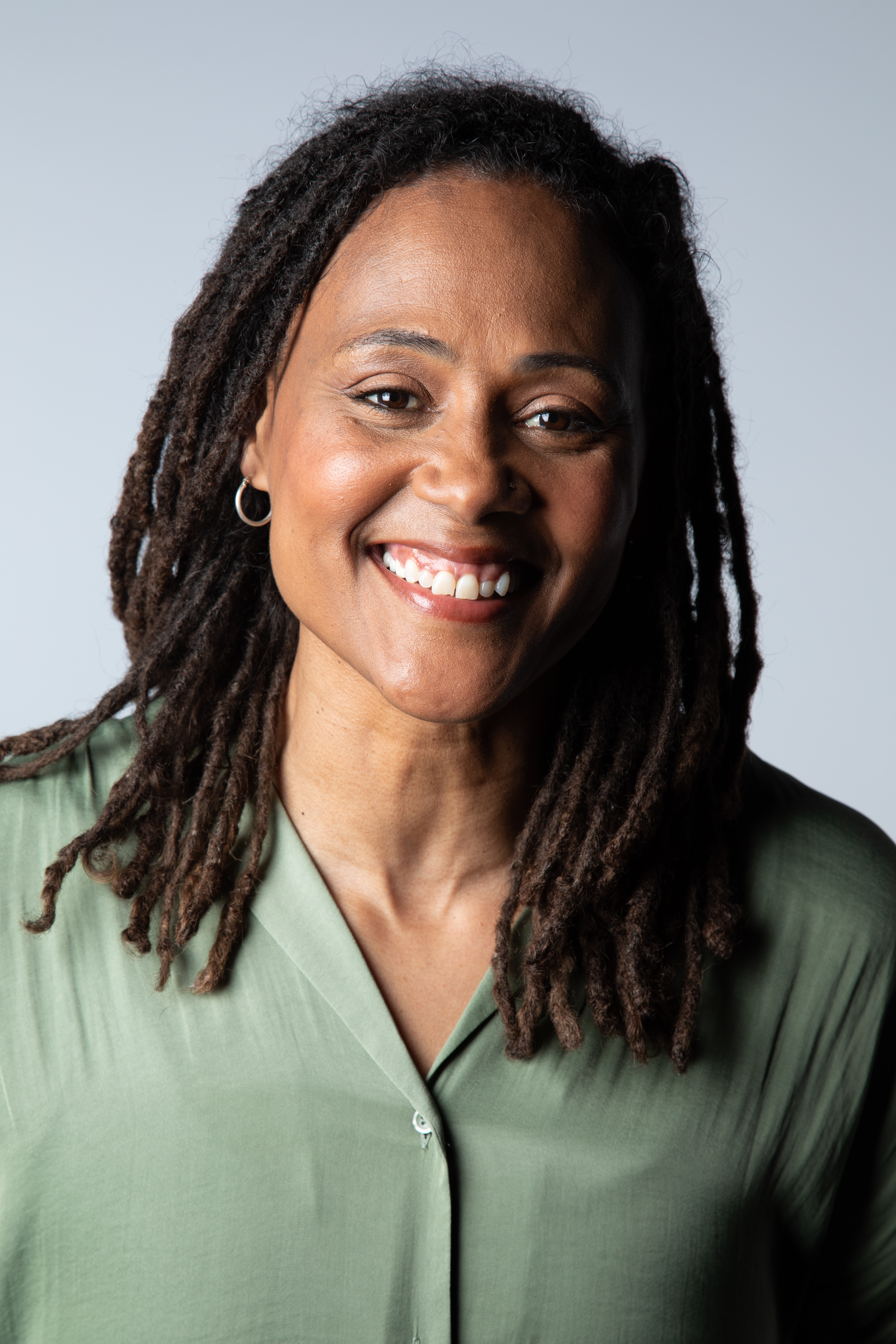
- Jones in 2024

Personal information
- Born: October 12, 1975 (age 51) Los Angeles, California, U.S.
- Height: 5 ft 10 in (178 cm)
- Weight: 150 lb (68 kg)

Sport
- Country: United States
- Sport: Track and field
- Events: 100 meters, 200 meters, long jump
Medal record
Women's athletics
Representing United States
Olympic Games
Disqualified	2000 Sydney	100 m
Disqualified	2000 Sydney	200 m
Disqualified	2000 Sydney	4 × 400 m relay
Disqualified	2000 Sydney	4 × 100 m relay
Disqualified	2000 Sydney	Long jump
World Championships
Gold medal – first place	1997 Athens	100 m
Gold medal – first place	1997 Athens	4 × 100 m relay
Gold medal – first place	1999 Seville	100 m
Bronze medal – third place	1999 Seville	Long jump
Disqualified	2001 Edmonton	100 m
Disqualified	2001 Edmonton	200 m
Disqualified	2001 Edmonton	4 × 100 m relay (Note: Teammate Kelli White was later found to have used performance-enhancing drugs and the IAAF disqualified the team.)
Continental Cup
Gold medal – first place	1998 Johannesburg	100 m
Gold medal – first place	1998 Johannesburg	200 m
Goodwill Games
Gold medal – first place	1998 Uniondale	100 m
Gold medal – first place	1998 Uniondale	200 m
Disqualified	2001 Brisbane	100 m

Marion Lois Jones (born October 12, 1975), married Marion Jones-Thompson, is an American former world champion track-and-field athlete and former professional basketball player. She won three gold medals and two bronze medals at the 2000 Summer Olympics in Sydney, Australia, but was later stripped of her medals after admitting to lying to federal investigators about her use of performance-enhancing drugs.

Jones was one of the most famous athletes to be linked to the BALCO scandal. The performance-enhancing substance usage scandal covered more than 20 top-level athletes, including Jones's ex-husband, shot putter C. J. Hunter, and 100 m sprinter Tim Montgomery.

Jones played college basketball for the North Carolina Tar Heels, where she won the NCAA championship in 1994. She later played two seasons of professional basketball in the Women's National Basketball Association as a point guard for the Tulsa Shock.

== Early life and education ==
Marion Jones was born to George Jones and his wife, Marion (originally from Belize), in Los Angeles. She holds dual citizenship with the United States and Belize. Her parents split when she was very young, and Jones's mother remarried a retired postal worker, Ira Toler, three years later. Toler became a stay-at-home dad to Jones and her older half-brother, Albert Kelly, until his sudden death in 1987. Jones turned to sports as an outlet for her grief: running, pickup basketball games, and whatever else her brother Albert was doing athletically. By the age of 15, she was routinely dominating California high-school athletics on both the track and the basketball court.

Jones is a 1997 graduate of the University of North Carolina (UNC).

== Track and field career ==
In high school, Jones won the CIF California State Meet in the 100 m sprint four years in a row, representing Rio Mesa the first two years and Thousand Oaks high school the last two. In 1992, she was successfully defended by attorney Johnnie Cochran on charges of missing a routine drug test. She was selected the Gatorade Player of the Year for track and field three years in a row, once at Rio Mesa and twice at Thousand Oaks. She was the Track and Field News "High School Athlete of the Year" in 1991 and 1992. She was the third female athlete to achieve the title twice, immediately following Angela Burnham at Rio Mesa High School, who was the second to achieve the title twice.

She was invited to participate in the 1992 Olympic trials, and after her showing in the 200 meters finals, would have made the team as an alternate in the 4 × 100 meter relay, but she declined the invitation. After winning further state-wide sprint titles, she accepted a full scholarship to the University of North Carolina in basketball, where she helped the team win the NCAA championship in her freshman year. Jones redshirted her 1996 basketball season to concentrate on track but was injured and never got the opportunity to try out.

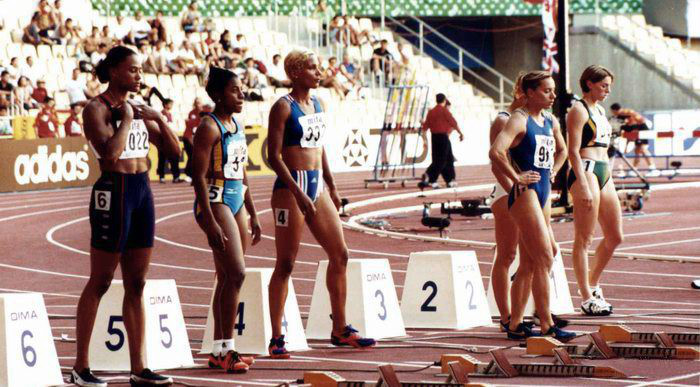
Jones (far left) during the 1999 World Championships

She excelled at her first major international competition, winning the 100 m sprint at the 1997 World Championships in Athens, while finishing 10th in the long jump. At the 1999 World Championships, Jones attempted to win four titles, but injured herself in the 200 m after a gold in the 100 m and a long jump bronze.

At the Sydney Olympics, Jones finished with three gold medals (100- and 200-meter sprint, and 4 × 400 m relay) and two bronze medals (long jump and 4 × 100 m relay). However, she was later stripped of these medals after admitting her use of performance-enhancing drugs. Jones vehemently denied using performance-enhancing drugs until her confession in 2007.

A dominant force in women's sprinting, Jones was upset in the 100 m sprint at the 2001 World Championships, as Ukrainian Zhanna Pintusevich-Block beat her for her first loss in the event in six years; Pintusevich-Block was one of the names revealed by Victor Conte during the BALCO scandals. Jones, however, did claim the gold in both the 200 m and 4 × 100 m relay.

On her 2004 Olympics experience, Jones said "It's extremely disappointing, words can't put it into perspective." She came in fifth in the long jump and competed in the women's 4x100 m relay where the team swept past the competition in the preliminaries only to miss a baton pass and finish last in the final race. Jones promised that her latest defeat would not be the end of her Olympic efforts, and reasserted in May 2005 that winning a gold medal at the 2008 Olympics remained her "ultimate goal."

May 2006 had Jones run 11.06 at altitude, but into a headwind in her season debut and beat Veronica Campbell and Lauryn Williams in subsequent 100 m events. By July 8, 2006, Jones appeared to be in top form; she won the 100 m sprint at Gaz de France with a time of 10.93 seconds. It was her fastest time in almost four years. Three days later, Jones once more improved on her seasonal best time at the Rome IIAF Golden League (10.91 seconds), but lost to Jamaica's Sherone Simpson, who clocked 10.87.

== WNBA career ==
Marion Jones
Personal information
- Born: October 12, 1975 (age 51) Los Angeles, California, U.S.
- Listed height: 5 ft 10 in (1.78 m)
- Listed weight: 150 lb (68 kg)

Career information
- High school: Thousand Oaks (Thousand Oaks, California)
- College: North Carolina (1993–1997)
- WNBA draft: 2003: 3rd round, 33rd overall pick
- Drafted by: Phoenix Mercury
- Playing career: 2010–2011
- Position: Point guard
- Number: 20

Career history
- 2010–2011: Tulsa Shock

Career highlights
- NCAA champion (1994); Third-team All-American – AP (1997); ACC tournament MVP (1997); 2× First-team All-ACC (1995, 1997); ACC All-Freshman Team (1994)
- Stats at Basketball Reference

In November 2009, Jones was working out for the San Antonio Silver Stars of the WNBA. She had played basketball while in college at the University of North Carolina, where her team won the national championship in 1994. Her No. 20 jersey, honored by the school, hangs in Carmichael Auditorium. She had been selected in the third round of the 2003 WNBA draft by the Phoenix Mercury. On March 10, 2010, the Tulsa Shock announced that Jones, a rookie, had signed to play with the team. Jones made her debut on May 15, in the Shock's inaugural game at the BOK Center against the Minnesota Lynx. On August 22, 2010, she logged her first start and scored a WNBA career high 15 points in a win against the Chicago Sky. In 47 WNBA games, Jones averaged 2.6 points and 1.3 rebounds per game. Jones was waived by the Shock on July 21, 2011.

== Personal life ==
While at UNC, Jones met and began dating one of the track coaches, shot putter C. J. Hunter. Hunter voluntarily resigned from his position at UNC to comply with the requirements of university rules prohibiting coach-athlete dating. Jones and Hunter were married on October 3, 1998, and trained for the Sydney 2000 Summer Olympics.

In the run-up to the 2000 Olympics, Jones declared that she intended to win gold medals in all five of her competition events at Sydney. Hunter had withdrawn from the shotput competition for a knee injury, though he was allowed to keep his coaching credentials and attend the games to support his wife. Just hours after Marion Jones won her first of the planned five golds, though, the International Olympic Committee (IOC) announced that Hunter had failed four pre-Olympic drug tests, testing positive each time for the banned anabolic steroid nandrolone. Hunter was immediately suspended from taking any role at the Sydney games, and he was ordered to surrender his on-field coaching credentials. At a press conference where Hunter broke down in tears, he denied taking any performance-enhancing drugs, much less the easily detected nandrolone. Jones would later write in her autobiography, Marion Jones: Life in the Fast Lane, that Hunter's positive drug tests hurt their marriage and her image as a drug-free athlete. The couple divorced in 2002.

On June 28, 2003, Jones gave birth to a son, Tim Montgomery Jr., with then-boyfriend Tim Montgomery, a world-class sprinter himself. Because of her pregnancy, Jones missed the 2003 World Championships, but spent a year preparing for the 2004 Olympics. Montgomery, who did not qualify for the 2004 Olympic track-and-field team for poor performance, was charged by the United States Anti-Doping Agency (USADA), as part of the investigation into the BALCO doping scandal, with receiving and using banned performance-enhancing drugs. The USADA sought a four-year suspension for Montgomery. Montgomery fought the ban, but lost the appeal on December 13, 2005, receiving a two-year ban from track-and-field competition; the Court of Arbitration for Sport also stripped Montgomery of all race results, records, and medals, from March 31, 2001, onward. Montgomery later announced his retirement.

On February 24, 2007, Jones married Barbadian sprinter and 2000 Olympic 100 m bronze medalist Obadele Thompson. Jones has two children with Thompson. Thompson and Jones divorced in 2017. Jones now resides in Austin, Texas with her long-time partner, Adele.

In 2010, Jones released a book, On the Right Track: From Olympic Downfall to Finding Forgiveness and the Strength to Overcome and Succeed, published by Simon & Schuster. Jones is now a full-time public speaker, trainer and coach. In 2024 Jones partnered with Driven Inc to launch Driven performance which focuses on building resilience skills through coaching and physical fitness.

=== Top Speed film ===
Jones appears in the 2003 film Top Speed, along with other speed specialists such as racing driver Lucas Luhr, mountain biker Marla Streb, and Porsche Cayenne designer Stephen Murkett. Directed by Greg MacGillivray and shot in IMAX format, the film covers details from races to mistakes she made within her performances.

== Use of illicit performance-enhancing drugs ==
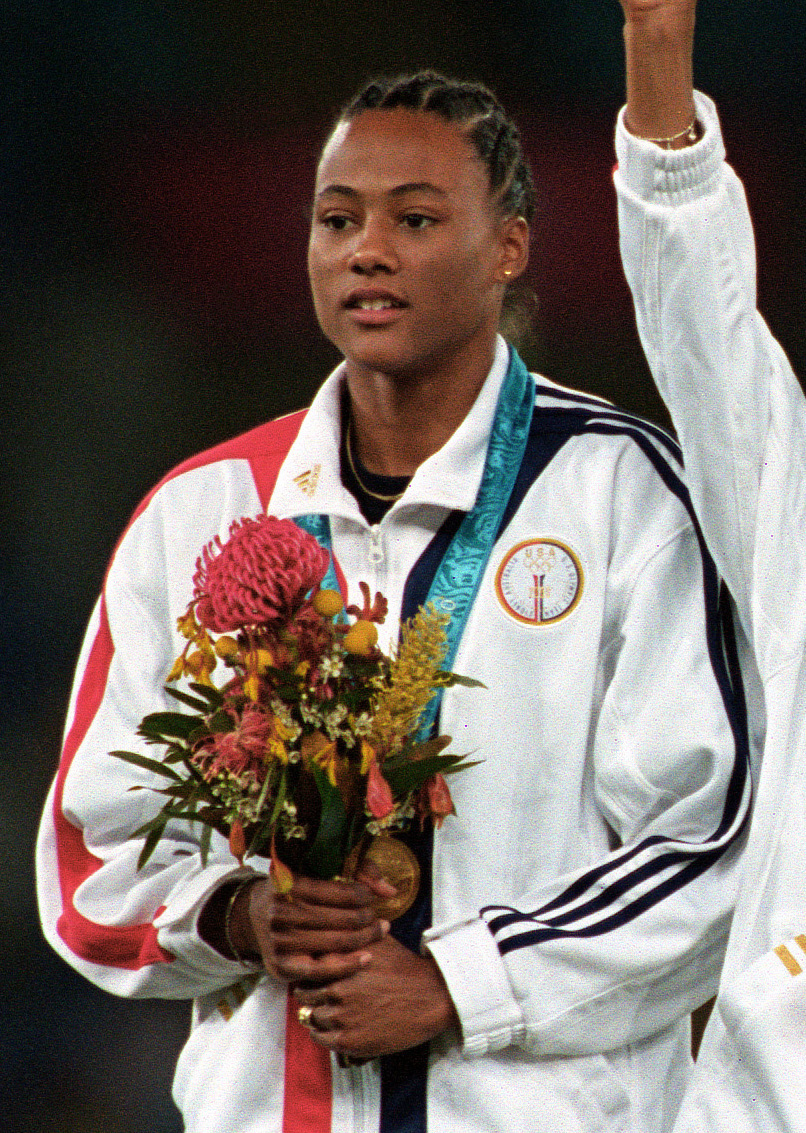
Jones at the 2000 Summer Olympics, where she used performance-enhancing drugs

Throughout most of her athletic career including two Olympiads and several championship meets, Jones had been accused, either directly or by implication, of taking performance-enhancing drugs. These accusations began in high school in the early 1990s, when she missed a random drug test and was consequently banned for four years from track and field competition. Jones, a minor, claimed that she never received the letter notifying her of the required test; and attorney Johnnie Cochran successfully got the four-year ban overturned. Jones tended to train with both coaches and athletes who themselves were dogged by rumors and accusations surrounding performance-enhancing drugs. And until 2007, Jones denied, in almost every way possible and in almost any venue where the question arose, being involved with performance enhancers. She frequently said that she had never tested positive for performance-enhancing substances.

=== BALCO investigation ===
On December 3, 2004, Victor Conte, the founder of BALCO, appeared in an interview with Martin Bashir on ABC's 20/20. In the interview, Conte told a national audience that he had personally given Jones four different illegal performance-enhancing drugs before, during, and after the 2000 Sydney Olympic Games. In the course of investigative research, San Francisco-based reporters Lance Williams and Mark Fainaru-Wada reported Jones had received banned drugs from BALCO, citing documentary evidence and testimony from Jones's ex-husband C.J. Hunter, who claims to have seen Jones inject herself in the stomach with the steroids.

According to Hunter's 2004 testimony before a federal grand jury, Jones's use of banned drugs began well before Sydney. Hunter told the investigators that Jones first obtained EPO (erythropoietin) from Graham, who Hunter said had a Mexican connection for the drug. Later, Hunter said, Graham met Conte, who began providing the coach with BALCO "nutritional supplements", which were actually an experimental class of "designer" steroids said to be undetectable by drug screening procedures available at the time. Graham then distributed the performance enhancers to Jones and other Sprint Capitol athletes. Subsequently, Hunter told federal agents Jones began receiving drugs directly from Conte.

Jones had never failed a drug test using the then-existing testing procedures, and insufficient evidence was found to bring charges regarding other untested performance-enhancing drugs.

=== 2006 EPO tests ===
The Washington Post, citing unidentified sources with knowledge of drug results from the USA Track and Field Championships in Indianapolis, reported that on June 23, 2006, an "A" sample of Marion Jones's urine tested positive for erythropoietin (EPO), a banned performance enhancer. Jones withdrew from the Weltklasse Golden League meet in Switzerland, citing "personal reasons", and once more denied using performance-enhancing drugs. She retained lawyer Howard Jacobs, who had represented many athletes in doping cases, including Tim Montgomery and cyclist Floyd Landis. On September 6, 2006, Jones's lawyers announced that her "B" sample had tested negative, which cleared her from the doping allegations.

=== Admission of lying during BALCO investigation ===
On October 5, 2007, Jones admitted to lying to federal agents under oath about her steroids use prior to the 2000 Summer Olympics and pleaded guilty at the U.S. District Court for the Southern District of New York (in White Plains). She confessed to Judge Kenneth M. Karas that she had made false statements regarding the BALCO and a check-fraud case. She was released on her own recognizance but was required to surrender both her U.S. and Belizean passports, pending sentencing in January. Although a maximum sentence of five years could be imposed, the prosecution recommended no more than six months as part of Jones's plea bargain.

After her admission, Jones held a press conference on the same day, where she publicly admitted to using steroids before the Olympics and acknowledged that she had, in fact, lied when she previously denied steroid use in statements to the press, to various sports agencies, and to two grand juries. One was impaneled to investigate the BALCO "designer steroid" ring, and the other was impaneled to investigate a check fraud ring involving many of the same parties from the BALCO case. As a result of these admissions, Jones accepted a two-year suspension from track and field competition issued by USADA and announced her retirement from track and field. She broke down into tears during the press conference as she apologized for her actions, saying: "And so it is with a great amount of shame, that I stand before you and tell you that I have betrayed your trust... and you have the right to be angry with me. I have let them down. I have let my country down. And I have let myself down."

USADA stated that their sanction "also requires disqualification of all her competitive results obtained after September 1, 2000, and forfeiture of all medals, results, points and prizes". On January 11, 2008, Jones was sentenced to six months in jail. She began her sentence on March 7, 2008, and was released on September 5, 2008.

In the BALCO case, she had denied to federal agents her use of the steroid tetrahydrogestrinone, known as "The Clear", or "THG", from 1999, but claimed she was given the impression she was taking a flaxseed oil supplement for two years while coach Trevor Graham supplied her with the substance. In a published letter in October 2007, Jones said that she had used the substance that was given to her described as flaxseed oil, which was later confirmed to be "The Clear" until she stopped training with Graham at the end of 2002. She said she lied when federal agents questioned her in 2003 because she panicked when they presented her with a sample of "The Clear".

=== U.S. Olympic Committee demands return of Olympic medals ===
Peter Ueberroth, chairman of the U.S. Olympic Committee, reacted to the news of Jones's confession and guilty plea on perjury charges by issuing a statement calling on Jones to "immediately step forward and return the Olympic medals she won while competing in violation of the rules". Ueberroth added that her admission was "long overdue and underscores the shame and dishonor that are inherent with cheating." IAAF president Lamine Diack said in a statement: "Marion Jones will be remembered as one of the biggest frauds in sporting history."

On October 8, 2007, a source confirmed that Marion Jones surrendered her five medals from the 2000 Summer Olympics. On the same day, Ueberroth said that all the relay medals should be returned, and on April 10, 2008, the IOC voted to strip Jones's relay teammates of their medals as well, although this decision would successfully be appealed by seven of Jones's teammates and overturned in 2010.

=== Formal IOC disqualification ===
On December 12, 2007, the IOC formally stripped Jones of all five Olympic medals dating back to September 2000, and banned her from attending the 2008 Summer Olympics in any capacity. The IOC action also officially disqualified Jones from her fifth-place finish in the long jump at the 2004 Summer Olympics.

On October 28, 2008, Jones was interviewed by Oprah Winfrey and stated that she would have won gold at the Sydney Olympics without the drugs that led to her disgrace.

=== Financial troubles ===
Seven years after winning a women's record five Olympic track and field medals and receiving multimillion-dollar endorsement deals, Jones was broke. According to the Associated Press, Jones was heavily in debt and fighting off court judgments, according to court records reviewed by the Los Angeles Times. In 2006, a bank foreclosed on her $2.5 million mansion in Apex, North Carolina. In her prime, Jones was one of track's first female sports millionaires, typically earning between $70,000 and $80,000 a race, plus at least another $1 million from race bonuses and endorsement deals.

=== Involvement in check fraud ===
In July 2006, Jones was linked to a check-counterfeiting scheme that led to criminal charges against her coach and former boyfriend Montgomery. Documents showed that a $25,000 check made out to Jones was deposited in her bank account as part of the alleged multimillion-dollar scheme. Prosecutors alleged that funds were sent to Jones's track coach, 1976 Olympic gold medalist Steve Riddick, in Virginia, then funneled back to New York through a network of "friends, relatives and associates." Riddick was arrested in February on money-laundering charges. According to the indictment and subsequent documents filed with the court, the link to Jones was made through one of Riddick's business partners, Nathaniel Alexander.

On October 5, 2007, Jones pleaded guilty to making false statements to IRS Special Agent Jeff Novitzky leading the ongoing BALCO investigation in California. Jones claimed she had never taken performance-enhancing drugs. "That was a lie, your honor", she said from the defense table. The federal government, through grand juries, had been investigating steroid abuse since 2003.

Jones also pleaded guilty to making false statements about her knowledge of a check-cashing scheme to New York U.S. Department of Homeland Security Special Agent Erik Rosenblatt, who has been leading a broad financial investigation that has already convicted Montgomery, sports agent Charles Wells, and her coach, Steve Riddick.

=== Criminal sentencing ===
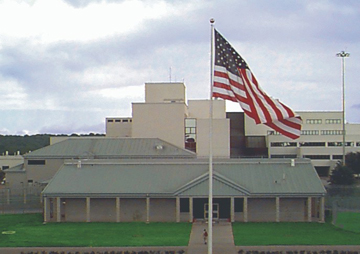
Federal Medical Center, Carswell, where Jones was imprisoned

Prosecutors told U.S. District Judge Kenneth Karas that any sentence between probation and six months' imprisonment would be fair (with the maximum penalty being five years in prison); Karas responded by seeking advice as to whether he could go beyond the six-month sentence. Meanwhile, Jones's lawyers asked that her penalty be limited to probation and community service, arguing, in part, that she had been punished enough by apologizing publicly, retiring from track and field, and relinquishing her five Olympic medals.

On January 11, 2008, Karas sentenced Jones to six months in jail for her involvement in the check fraud case and her use of performance-enhancing drugs. During the sentencing hearing, the judge admonished her, saying that she knew what she was doing and would be punished accordingly. "The offenses here are serious. They each involve lies made three years apart", Karas said, adding that Jones's actions were "not a one-off mistake...but a repetition in an attempt to break the law."

Jones was ordered to surrender on March 15, 2008. She reported four days early, on March 11, at the Federal Medical Center, Carswell prison in Fort Worth and was assigned Federal Bureau of Prisons register no. 84868–054. She was released from prison on September 5, 2008.

== Post-scandal ==
Jones appeared in season 3 of Special Forces: World's Toughest Test where she was medically withdrawn during the third episode.

== Statistics ==
=== Track and field ===
==== Personal bests ====
Date	Event	Venue	Performance
September 12, 1998	100 m	Johannesburg, South Africa	10.65A
August 22, 1999	100 m	Seville, Spain	10.70
September 11, 1998	200 m	Johannesburg, South Africa	21.62A
August 13, 1997	200 m	Zürich, Switzerland	21.76
April 22, 2001	300 m	Walnut, California	35.68
April 16, 2000	400 m	Walnut, California	49.59
May 31, 1998	Long jump	Eugene, Oregon	7.31 (23' 11¾")

==== Individual achievements ====
Year	Competition	Venue	Position	Event	Result
Representing the United States
1992	World Junior Championships	Seoul, South Korea	5th	100 m	11.58 (wind: +0.3 m/s)
1992	World Junior Championships	Seoul, South Korea	7th	200 m	24.09 (wind: +0.3 m/s)
1992	World Junior Championships	Seoul, South Korea	2nd	4 × 100 m relay	44.51
1997	IAAF World Championships	Athens, Greece	1st	100 m	10.83
1997	IAAF World Championships	Athens, Greece	10th	Long jump	6.63 m
1998	IAAF World Cup	Johannesburg, South Africa	1st	100 m	10.65A
1998	IAAF World Cup	Johannesburg, South Africa	1st	200 m	21.62A
1998	IAAF World Cup	Johannesburg, South Africa	2nd	Long jump	7.00A (22' 11¾")
1999	IAAF World Championships	Sevilla, Spain	1st	100 m	10.70
1999	IAAF World Championships	Sevilla, Spain	3rd	Long jump	6.83 (22 ft 5 in)
2000	2000 Summer Olympics	Sydney, Australia	dq	100 m	10.75
2000	2000 Summer Olympics	Sydney, Australia	dq	200 m	21.84
2000	2000 Summer Olympics	Sydney, Australia	dq	Long jump	6.92 (22' 8½")
2001	IAAF World Championships	Edmonton, Canada	dq	100 m	10.85
2001	IAAF World Championships	Edmonton, Canada	dq	200 m	22.39
2002	IAAF World Cup	Madrid, Spain	dq	100 m	10.90
2004	2004 Summer Olympics	Athens, Greece	dq	Long jump	6.85 m
2004	2004 Summer Olympics	Athens, Greece	dq	4 × 100 m	DNF

- The United States Anti-Doping Agency stripped Jones of every single medal, point and result received after September 1, 2000, after she admitted to using performance-enhancing steroids prior to the 2000 Summer Olympics.

==== Awards ====
- World Athletics Awards

World Athlete of the Year (Women): 1997, 1998

=== WNBA ===
==== Regular season ====
Legend
GP	Games played	GS	Games started	MPG	Minutes per game	RPG	Rebounds per game
APG	Assists per game	SPG	Steals per game	BPG	Blocks per game	PPG	Points per game
TO	Turnovers per game	FG%	Field-goal percentage	3P%	3-point field-goal percentage	FT%	Free-throw percentage
**Bold**	Career best	°	League leader

*	Denotes season(s) in which Jones won an NCAA Championship

Year	Team	GP	GS	MPG	FG%	3P%	FT%	RPG	APG	SPG	BPG	TO	PPG
2003	Did not appear in league												
2004	Did not appear in league												
2005	Did not appear in league												
2006	Did not appear in league												
2007	Did not appear in league												
2008	Did not appear in league												
2009	Did not appear in league												
2010	Tulsa	**33**	**1**	**9.4**	**52.5**	**25.0**	**59.5**	**1.6**	**0.6**	0.5	**0.2**	0.7	**3.4**
2011	Tulsa	14	0	6.5	19.0	0.0	50.0	0.4	0.2	0.5	0.1	**0.4**	0.7
**Career**	2 years, 1 team	47	1	8.6	45.5	16.7	58.7	1.3	0.5	0.5	0.2	0.6	2.6

=== College basketball ===
NCAA statistics
Year	Team	GP	GS	MPG	FG%	3P%	FT%	RPG	APG	SPG	BPG	TO	PPG
1993–94*	North Carolina	**35**			.529	.280	**.713**	4.1	3.0	3.2	0.8		14.1
1994–95	North Carolina	35			.525	**.298**	.655	**5.0**	**4.8**	**3.5**	**0.9**		17.9
1995–96	North Carolina	Did not play due to injury											
1996–97	North Carolina	32			**.536**	.267	.657	4.7	4.1	3.1	0.6		**18.6**
**Career**		102	—	—	.530	.284	.670	4.6	4.0	3.3	0.8	—	16.8

== Notes ==
Awards
Preceded by Svetlana Masterkova	Women's Track & Field Athlete of the Year; 1997–1998	Succeeded by Gabriela Szabo
Preceded by Marie-José Pérec	Women's Track & Field ESPY Award; 1998–2002	Succeeded by Gail Devers
Preceded by Gabriela Szabo	Women's Track & Field Athlete of the Year; 2000	Succeeded by Stacy Dragila
Preceded by Inaugural Awarded	World Sportswoman of the Year; 2000	Succeeded by Cathy Freeman
Preceded by Jenny Thompson	USOC Sportswoman of the Year; 2000	Succeeded by Jennifer Capriati
Achievements
Preceded by Marie-José Pérec; Mary Onyali	Women's 200 m Best Year Performance; 1997–1998	Succeeded by Inger Miller
Preceded by Lyudmila Galkina	Women's Long Jump Best Year Performance; 1998	Succeeded by Maurren Higa Maggi
Preceded by Inger Miller	Women's 200 m Best Year Performance; 2000	Succeeded by Debbie Ferguson; LaTasha Jenkins
