= Athletics Alberta =

Canadian provincial sports governing body

Athletics Alberta is the provincial sports organization responsible for the promotion, coordination and organization of track and field, cross-country and road running in Alberta, Canada. Athletics Alberta is the provincial governing body that represents the national sport governing body, Athletics Canada.

Athletics Alberta is a registered non-profit organization. Athletics Alberta provides governance of the sport of athletics for male and female athletes, officials and coaches.

== See also ==
- Sports in Canada
- Athletics Canada
- Other Provincial Organizations Governing Athletics
