= Dainelky Pérez =

Cuban sprinter

Personal information
- Nationality: Cuban
- Born: 6 January 1976 (age 50) Pinar del Río, Cuba

Sport
- Sport: Sprinting
- Event: 4 × 100 metres relay
Medal record
Representing Cuba
Pan American Games
Silver medal – second place	1995 Mar del Plata	4x100m relay
Silver medal – second place	2003 Santo Domingo	4x100m relay
Central American and Caribbean Games
Gold medal – first place	1998 Maracaibo	4x100m relay
Bronze medal – third place	1998 Maracaibo	100m hurdles

Dainelky Pérez Sánchez (born 6 January 1976) is a Cuban sprinter. She competed in the women's 4 × 100 metres relay at the 1996 Summer Olympics.
