= Cathy Freeman =

Aboriginal Australian athlete and Olympic gold medallist (born 1973)

Cathy Freeman AC
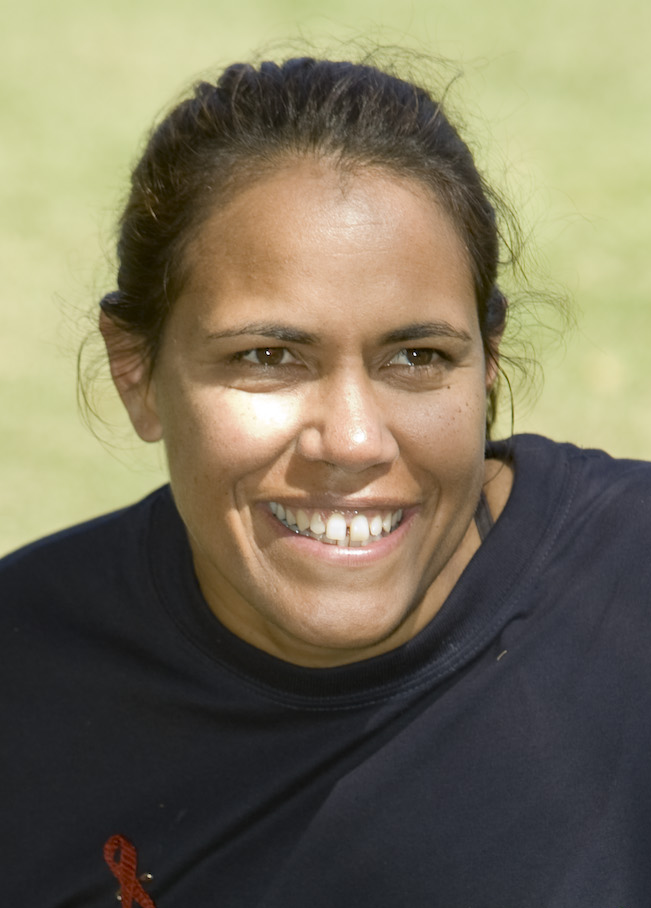
- Freeman in 2008

Personal information
- Full name: Catherine Astrid Salome Freeman
- Born: 16 February 1973 (age 53) Mackay, Queensland, Australia
- Education: Fairholme College; University of Melbourne
- Occupation: Australian sprinter/runner
- Height: 164 cm (5 ft 5 in)
- Weight: 56 kg (8 st 11 lb; 123 lb)
- Spouses: Sandy Bodecker (m. 1999; div. 2003) James Murch (m. 2009; sep. 2024)

Sport
- Country: Australia
- Coached by: Step-father Bruce Barber, Mike Danila, Peter Fortune
- Retired: 1 July 2003
Medal record
Women's athletics
Representing Australia
Olympic Games
Gold medal – first place	2000 Sydney	400 m
Silver medal – second place	1996 Atlanta	400 m
World Championships
Gold medal – first place	1997 Athens	400 m
Gold medal – first place	1999 Seville	400 m
Bronze medal – third place	1995 Gothenburg	4 × 400 m relay
Commonwealth Games
Gold medal – first place	1990 Auckland	4 × 100 m
Gold medal – first place	1994 Victoria	200 m
Gold medal – first place	1994 Victoria	400 m
Gold medal – first place	2002 Manchester	4 × 400 m
Silver medal – second place	1994 Victoria	4 × 100 m

Catherine Astrid Salome Freeman (born 16 February 1973) is an Australian former sprinter who specialised in the 400 metres event. Her personal best of 48.63 seconds currently ranks her as the 11th-fastest woman of all time, set while finishing second to Marie-José Pérec's number-six time at the 1996 Olympics. She became the Olympic champion for the women's 400 metres at the 2000 Summer Olympics, at which she had lit the Olympic Flame.

Freeman was the first female Indigenous Australian to become a Commonwealth Games gold medalist at age 16 in 1990. The year 1994 was her breakthrough season. At the 1994 Commonwealth Games in Canada, Freeman won gold in both the 200 m and 400 m. She also won the silver medal at the 1996 Olympics and came first at the 1997 World Championships in the 400 m event. In 1998, Freeman took a break from running due to injury. She returned from injury in form with a first-place finish in the 400 m at the 1999 World Championships. She announced her retirement from athletics in 2003.

In 2007, she founded the Cathy Freeman Foundation, which changed names twice (to Community Spirit Foundation and later to Murrup). She is of the Kuku-yalanji and Birri-gubba peoples.

== Early life and education ==
Catherine Astrid Salome Freeman was born in Mackay, Queensland into a family of Indigenous Australian, Chinese and Syrian descent. Her father, Norman, was a well-known rugby league player within the local Queensland competitions and was nicknamed "Twinkle Toes" due to his speed. Her maternal grandmother was a member of the stolen generation and her first cousin once removed is singer Jessica Mauboy. Cathy grew up with three brothers and played an array of sports growing up, including basketball, netball, touch football and athletics.

In 1986, she received a scholarship to attend an exclusive girls' school Fairholme College in Toowoomba, and spent one year there before moving to the Gold Coast hinterland upon receiving a sports scholarship to attend Kooralbyn International School in 1987. She finished her schooling at Kooralbyn in 1990, and upon graduation was offered a job as a recreation officer at the Kooralbyn Valley Resort, where she worked briefly.

== Career ==
=== 1987–1989 ===
At Kooralbyn International School, Freeman was coached professionally by Romanian Mike Danila, who later became a key influence throughout her career; he provided a strict training regime for the young athlete. After 1987, she was also coached by her stepfather, Bruce Barber, to various regional and national titles.

In a competition in 1989, Freeman ran 11.67 s in the 100 metres and Danila began to think about entering her in the Commonwealth Games Trials in Sydney.

=== 1990–1995 ===
In 1990, Freeman was chosen as a member of Australia's 4 × 100 m relay team for the 1990 Commonwealth Games in Auckland, New Zealand. The team won the gold medal, making Freeman the first-ever Aboriginal Commonwealth Games gold medallist, as well as one of the youngest, at 16 years old. She moved to Melbourne in 1990 after the Auckland Commonwealth Games. Shortly after moving to Melbourne, her manager Nic Bideau introduced Freeman to athletics coach Peter Fortune, who would become Freeman's coach for the rest of her career. She was then selected to represent Australia at the 1990 World Junior Championships in Athletics in Plovdiv, Bulgaria. There, she reached the semi-finals of the 100 m and placed fifth in the final of the 200 m.

Freeman competed in her second World Junior Championships in Seoul, South Korea. She competed only in the 200 m, winning the silver medal behind China's Hu Ling. Also in 1992, she travelled to her first Olympic Games in Barcelona, reaching the second round of her new specialty event, the 400 metres, and finishing 7th as part of the Australian team in the women's 4 × 400 m relay finals. At the 1993 World Championships in Athletics Freeman competed in the 200 m, reaching the semi-finals.

1994 was Freeman's breakthrough season, when she entered into the world's elite for the first time. Competing at the 1994 Commonwealth Games in Canada, Freeman won gold in both the 200 m and 400 m. She also competed as a member of Australia's 4 × 100 m squad, winning the silver medal and as a member of the 4 × 400 m team, who finished first but were later disqualified after Freeman obstructed the Nigerian runner. During the 1994 season, Freeman took 1.3 seconds from her 400 m personal best, achieving 50.04 seconds. She also set all-time personal bests in the 100 m (11.24) and 200 m (22.25).

Although a medal favourite at the 1995 World Championships in Athletics in Sweden, Freeman finished fourth. She also reached the semi-finals of the 200 m.

=== 1996–2003 ===
Freeman made more progress during the 1996 season, setting many personal bests and Australian records. By this stage, she was the biggest challenger to France's Marie-José Pérec at the 1996 Olympics. She eventually took the silver medal behind Pérec, in an Australian record of 48.63 seconds. This was the fourth-fastest since the world record was set in Canberra, Australia, in 1985. Pérec's winning time of 48.25 was an Olympic record.

In 1997, Freeman won the 400 m at the World Championships in Athens, with a time of 49.77 seconds. Her only loss in the 400 m that season was in Oslo where she injured her foot.

Freeman took a break for the 1998 season, due to injury. Upon her return to the track in 1999, Freeman did not lose a single 400 m race, including at the World Championships.

Freeman also lit the torch in the 2000 Olympic Games in Sydney.

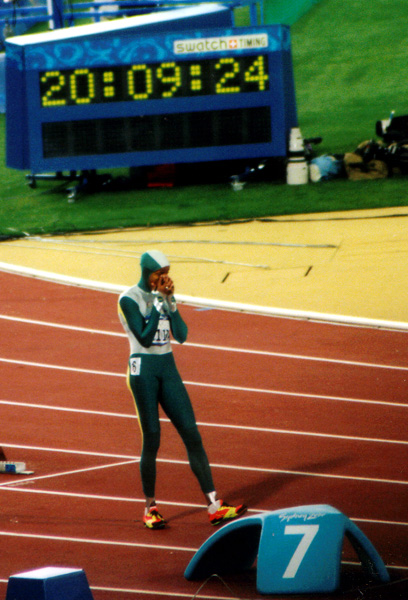
Freeman preparing to race in the Olympic 400 m final, Sydney 2000.

She continued to win into the 2000 season, despite Pérec's return to the track. Freeman was the home favourite for the 400 m title at the 2000 Olympics in Sydney, where she was expected to face-off with rival Pérec. This showdown never happened, as Pérec left the Games after what she described as harassment from strangers. Freeman won the Olympic title in a time of 49.11 seconds, becoming only the second Australian Aboriginal Olympic champion (the first was Freeman's 4 × 400 teammate Nova Peris-Kneebone who won for field hockey four years earlier in Atlanta). After the race, Freeman took a victory lap, carrying both the Aboriginal and Australian flags. This was despite unofficial flags being banned at the Olympic Games, and the Aboriginal flag, while recognised as official in Australia, not being a national flag or recognised by the International Olympic Committee. Freeman also reached the final of the 200 m, coming sixth. In honour of her gold medal win in Sydney, she represented Oceania in carrying the Olympic flag at the opening ceremonies of the next Olympics, in Salt Lake City, joining Archbishop Desmond Tutu (Africa), John Glenn (The Americas), Kazuyoshi Funaki (Asia), Lech Wałęsa (Europe), Jean-Michel Cousteau (Environment), Jean-Claude Killy (Sport), and Steven Spielberg (Culture). In 2024, she revealed a sense of regret at not getting to race against Pérec at the Sydney Games, feeling that Pérec's absence led to her gold-winning time being slower than her Olympic best at the previous event, and also adding that the expected showdown "would've taken women's 400m running to the next level."

Throughout her career, Freeman regularly competed in the Victorian Athletic League where she won two 400 m races at the Stawell Gift Carnival. Freeman did not compete during the 2001 season. In 2002 she returned to the track to compete as a member of Australia's victorious 4 × 400 m relay team at the 2002 Commonwealth Games.

Freeman announced her retirement in 2003.

== Post-athletic career ==
Since retiring from athletics Freeman has become involved in a range of community and charitable activities. She was an Ambassador of the Australian Indigenous Education Foundation (AIEF) until 2012.

Freeman was appointed as an Ambassador for Cottage by the Sea (a children's holiday camp in Queenscliffe, Victoria), alongside celebrity chef Curtis Stone and big-wave surfer Jeff Rowley. Freeman retired from her position as Patron after 10 years in 2014.

=== Cathy Freeman Foundation ===
In 2007 Freeman founded the Cathy Freeman Foundation. The Foundation works with four remote Indigenous communities to close the gap in education between Indigenous and non-Indigenous Australian children, by offering incentives for children to attend school. It partners with the AIEF and the Brotherhood of St Laurence.

== Personal life ==
Freeman was born in 1973 at Slade Point, Mackay, Queensland, to Norman Freeman and Cecelia Barber. Norman was born in Woorabinda of the Birri Gubba people and has Syrian ancestry; Cecelia was born on Palm Island in Queensland, and is of Kuku Yalanji heritage. Freeman and her brothers Gavin, Garth, and Norman were raised in Mackay and in other parts of Queensland. She also had an older sister, Anne-Marie, who was born in 1966 and died in 1990. Anne-Marie had cerebral palsy and spent much of her life in the Birribi care facility in Rockhampton.

Freeman attended several schools, including schools in Mackay and Coppabella, but was mostly educated at Fairholme College in Toowoomba where she attended after winning a scholarship to board there.

Freeman's parents divorced in 1978, after which her father returned to Woorabinda.

Freeman has described how she has been influenced by early experiences with racism and also by the Baháʼí Faith. She was raised a Catholic, and says of her faith, "I'm not a devout Catholic but I like the prayers and I appreciate their values about the equality of all human kind."

Freeman had a long-term romantic relationship with Nick Bideau, her manager, that ended in acrimony and legal wranglings over Freeman's endorsement earnings. Freeman married Alexander "Sandy" Bodecker, a Nike executive 20 years her senior, in 1999. After her success in Sydney she took an extended break from the track to nurse Bodecker through a bout of throat cancer from May to October 2002. She announced their separation in February 2003. Later that year, Freeman began dating Australian actor Joel Edgerton whom she had initially met at the 2002 TV Week Logies. Their relationship ended in early 2005.

In October 2006, Freeman announced her engagement to Melbourne stockbroker James Murch. They married at Spray Farm on the Bellarine Peninsula on 11 April 2009. Freeman gave birth to her first child in 2011. In August 2024 Freeman and Murch announced their separation.

Freeman is a supporter of National Rugby League team the Cronulla-Sutherland Sharks and Australian Football League team the Carlton Blues. Freeman was also a part of the "Group of 14" who backed the return of the South Sydney Rabbitohs to the NRL following their exclusion in 2000 and 2001.

On 10 October 2023, Freeman was one of 25 Australians of the Year who signed an open letter supporting the Yes vote in the Indigenous Voice referendum, initiated by psychiatrist Patrick McGorry.

On her right arm, the side closest to the spectators on an athletics track, she has the words "Cos I'm free" tattooed midway between her shoulder and elbow.

== Media ==
She joined with actress Deborah Mailman on a road trip, a four-part television documentary series Going Bush (2006) where the pair set off on a journey from Broome to Arnhem Land spending time with Indigenous communities along the way.

In 2008, Freeman participated in Who Do You Think You Are? and discovered that her mother was of Chinese and English heritage as well as Aboriginal. As a result of a 1917 Queensland policy that Aboriginal people could serve in the military if they had a European parent, her paternal great-grandfather, Frank Fisher served in the 11th Light Horse Regiment during World War I.

=== Film ===
The 2020 documentary film Freeman, written and directed by French-Australian director Laurence Billiet in her feature documentary debut, won the Digital History Prize at the 2021 New South Wales Premier's History Awards. Billiet is co-founder of Melbourne production studio General Strike, along with Rachael Antony, who was script editor on Freeman. The film was a collaboration with former Bangarra Dance Theatre artistic director, Stephen Page, who had co-directed the Indigenous segment, Awakening, for the opening ceremony of the 2000 Olympics with Rhoda Roberts. He choreographed a dance for Bangarra dancer Lillian Banks to perform in the film. Freeman talks about her experiences as an elite athlete, and the film also looks at "[Australians'] experience as a nation of spectators". The film screened on ABC Television on Sunday 13 September 2020 and then on ABC iview. Freeman was well-reviewed and won many awards, and became the most-watched Australian documentary of 2020.

== Competition record ==
=== International competitions ===
Year	Competition	Venue	Position	Event	Result
Representing Australia
1990	Commonwealth Games	Auckland, New Zealand	1st	4 × 100 m relay	43.87
1990	World Junior Championships	Plovdiv, Bulgaria	15th (sf)	100 m	11.87 (wind: -1.3 m/s)
1990	World Junior Championships	Plovdiv, Bulgaria	5th	200 m	23.61 (wind: +1.3 m/s)
1990	World Junior Championships	Plovdiv, Bulgaria	5th	4 × 100 m relay	45.01
1992	Summer Olympics	Barcelona, Spain	7th	4 × 400 m relay	3:26.42
1992	World Junior Championships	Seoul, South Korea	2nd	200 m	23.25 (wind: +0.3 m/s)
1992	World Junior Championships	Seoul, South Korea	6th	4 × 400 m relay	3:36.28
1994	Commonwealth Games	Victoria Canada	1st	200 m	22.25
1994	Commonwealth Games	Victoria Canada	1st	400 m	50.38
1994	Commonwealth Games	Victoria Canada	2nd	4 × 100 m relay	43.43
1994	IAAF Grand Prix Final	Paris, France	2nd	400 m	50.04
1995	World Championships	Gothenburg, Sweden	4th	400 m	50.60
1995	World Championships	Gothenburg, Sweden	3rd	4 × 400 m relay	3:25.88
1996	Summer Olympics	Atlanta, United States	2nd	400 m	48.63
1996	IAAF Grand Prix Final	Milan, Italy	1st	400 m	49.60
1997	World Championships	Athens, Greece	1st	400 m	49.77
1999	World Championships	Seville, Spain	1st	400 m	49.67
1999	World Championships	Seville, Spain	6th	4 × 400 m relay	3:28.04
1999	World Indoor Championships	Maebashi, Japan	2nd	4 × 400 m relay	3:26.87
2000	Summer Olympics	Sydney, Australia	6th	200 m	22.53
2000	Summer Olympics	Sydney, Australia	1st	400 m	49.11
2000	Summer Olympics	Sydney, Australia	5th	4 × 400 m relay	3:23.81
2002	Commonwealth Games	Manchester, Great Britain	1st	4 × 400 m relay	3:25.63

=== National championships ===
Year	Competition	Venue	Position	Event
1990	Australian Championships	Melbourne, Australia	2nd	100 m
1990	Australian Championships	Melbourne, Australia	3rd	200 m
1991	Australian Championships	Sydney, Australia	1st	200 m
1992	Australian Championships	Adelaide, Australia	2nd	200 m
1992	Australian Championships	Adelaide, Australia	3rd	400 m
1993	Australian Championships	Queensland, Australia	2nd	200 m
1994	Australian Championships	Sydney, Australia	1st	100 m
1994	Australian Championships	Sydney, Australia	1st	200 m
1995	Australian Championships	Sydney, Australia	2nd	200 m
1995	Australian Championships	Sydney, Australia	1st	400 m
1996	Australian Championships	Sydney, Australia	1st	100 m
1996	Australian Championships	Sydney, Australia	1st	200 m
1997	Australian Championships	Melbourne, Australia	2nd	200 m
1997	Australian Championships	Melbourne, Australia	1st	400 m
1998	Australian Championships	Melbourne, Australia	1st	400 m
1999	Australian Championships	Melbourne, Australia	1st	400 m
2000	Australian Championships	Sydney, Australia	1st	200 m
2000	Australian Championships	Sydney, Australia	1st	400 m
2003	Australian Championships	Brisbane, Australia	1st	400 m

=== Circuit performances ===
Year	Competition	Venue	Position	Event
2000	Golden League 2000 – Exxon Mobil Bislett Games	Oslo, Norway	1st	400 m
2000	Golden League 2000 – Herculis Zepter	Monaco	1st	400 m
2000	Golden League 2000 – Meeting Gaz de France de Paris	Paris, France	1st	200 m
2000	Golden League 2000 – Memorial Van Damme	Brussels, Belgium	1st	400 m
2000	Grand Prix 2000 – Athletissima 2000	Lausanne, Switzerland	1st	400 m
2000	Grand Prix 2000 – CGU Classic	Gateshead, Great Britain	1st	200 m
2000	Grand Prix 2000 – Melbourne Track Classic	Melbourne, Australia	1st	400 m
2000	Grand Prix 2000 – Tsiklitiria Meeting	Athens, Greece	1st	400 m

== Awards ==
- Young Australian of the Year 1990
- Australian of the Year 1998
- Australian Sports Medal 2000
- Centenary Medal 2001
- Medal of the Order of Australia (OAM) 2001
- In 2001, Freeman received the Olympic Order from Juan Antonio Samaranch
- Laureus named Freeman Sportswoman of the Year in 2001
- Arthur Ashe Courage Award 2001
- Victorian Honour Roll of Women 2001
- Deadly Awards 2003 – Female Sportsperson of the Year
- Sport Australia Hall of Fame induction in 2005
- Queensland Sport Hall of Fame induction in 2009
- In 2009 as part of the Q150 celebrations, Freeman was announced as one of the Q150 Icons of Queensland for her role as a "sports legend"
- In 2025, she was an inaugural inductee of the Stadium Australia Hall of Fame
- Companion of the Order of Australia 2026

Awards and achievements
Preceded by (United States) Marion Jones	World Sportswoman of the Year; 2001	Succeeded by (United States) Jennifer Capriati
Olympic Games
Preceded by (Japan) Midori Ito	Final Olympic torchbearer Sydney 2000	Succeeded by (United States) 1980 USA Men's Ice Hockey Team
Preceded by (United States) Muhammad Ali	Final Summer Olympic torchbearer Sydney 2000	Succeeded by (Greece) Nikolaos Kaklamanakis
