= Melinda Gainsford-Taylor =

Australian sprinter (born 1971)

Melinda Gainsford-Taylor AM
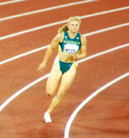
- Melinda Gainsford-Taylor in 2000

Personal information
- Born: 1 October 1971 (age 54) Narromine, New South Wales, Australia
- Height: 172 cm (5 ft 8 in)
- Weight: 67 kg (10 st 8 lb)

Sport
- Country: Australia
- Sport: Track and field
- Events: Women's 100 m & 200 m 4 × 100 m & 400 m relays
Medal record
Women's Athletics
Representing Australia
World Championships
Bronze medal – third place	1995 Gothenburg	4 × 400 m relay
World Indoor Championships
Gold medal – first place	1995 Barcelona	200 m
Silver medal – second place	1993 Toronto	200 m
Commonwealth Games
Silver medal – second place	1994 Victoria	4 × 100 m relay
Bronze medal – third place	1994 Victoria	200 m
- Updated on 9 February 2014

Melinda Gainsford-Taylor AM (born 1 October 1971 in Narromine, New South Wales) is a retired Australian athlete, who specialised in sprint events. Replacing veteran Raelene Boyle in broadcasting, she commentated athletics at Network Ten for Delhi 2010, London 2012 for the Nine Network and Glasgow 2014 for Ten.

In 1995 Gainsford-Taylor won the World Indoor championship over 200 m. During her career she also won international medals at the World Championships and Commonwealth Games.

== Junior career ==
In 1989, she won the first of three consecutive Australian Junior 100 m titles, also winning the Junior 200 m championships in 1989 and 1991.

At the 1990 World Junior Championships Gainsford reached the semi-finals of both the 100 and 200 metres sprints and assisted the Australian 4 × 100 metres relay team to a new national junior record of 45.01 seconds.

== Senior career ==
Although Gainsford-Taylor became a world champion in 1995, her senior career really began when she won the first of five 100 m/200 m sprint doubles at the 1992 Australian National Championships and won selection in the Olympic team, where she made the semi-finals of the 200 m.

In 1993, she won a silver medal at the World Indoor Championships, but later in the season broke down in the 100 m semi-finals of the 1993 World Championships in Athletics.

During 1994, Gainsford-Taylor won a bronze medal at the Commonwealth Games behind her arch-rival Cathy Freeman and set an Australian record for 100 m of 11.12. A year later, she won the 200 m at the 1995 World Indoor Championships in Athletics and took home a bronze medal from the 1995 World Championships in Athletics as part of the Australian 4 × 400 m relay team.

In 1997, defending her World Indoor crown, Gainsford was disqualified for running out of her lane in the semi-final of the 200 m. Later in the year, she created a new Australian record of 22.23 seconds. Soon after, Gainsford-Taylor reached her first individual outdoor final at the Athens World Championships, placing 7th in the 200 m final.

The latter part of her career was hampered by injury. Running with knee problems, she broke down metres before the finish when in first place during the 200 m race at the 1998 Commonwealth Games.

During her career, she won a total of thirteen individual open titles – two at 100 yards, six at 100 metres and five over 200 metres.

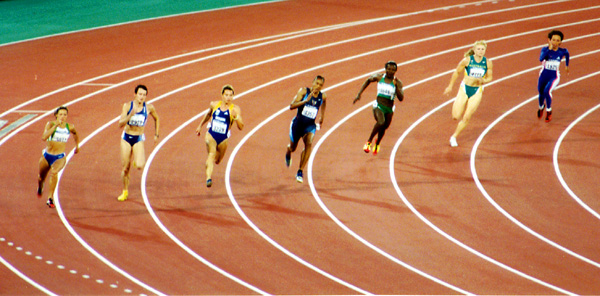
Melinda Gainsford-Taylor (second from the right) at Olympic Games in 2000 in Sydney.

At her third Olympic Games at Sydney 2000 she made the final of the 200 m sprint, placing 6th, and assisted the Australian 4 × 400 m relay team to a fifth-place finish and a new national record.

Still holding the Australian record at 200 m, and sharing in 4 × 100 m and 4 × 400 m relay records, Gainsford-Taylor retired in 2002.

== Family life ==
Gainsford-Taylor is married to Mark Taylor and the couple have two children, Nicholas and Gabriella. In 2015, Gabriella became the fastest 10-year-old girl in the country over 100 metres (330 ft) and 200 metres (660 ft).

Gainsford-Taylor is the cousin of Australian Olympic backstroke swimmer Josh Watson, who won silver in the Men's 4 × 100-metre medley relay at the Sydney Olympics in 2000.

== Post career ==
Gainsford-Taylor now works with Little Athletics New South Wales visiting schools. She also provides commentary for Australian TV channel One during their coverage of the Australian Athletics Tour.

She is a fan of National Rugby League team the Manly-Warringah Sea Eagles and is a former board member of the club. She is also a member of the "Eagle Angels", a high-profile group of women who excel in their chosen fields and have a passion for the Sea Eagles. Other members include comedian, author and radio personality Wendy Harmer, World Surfing Champion Layne Beachley, newsreader Tracey Spicer, and swimmer Brooke Hanson.

In 2017 Gainsford-Taylor was appointed a Member of the Order of Australia for significant service to athletics as a sprinter, at the national and international level, and as a role model for young athletes.

== Statistics ==
Personal Bests – outdoor

Event	Time	Wind	City	Date
100 Yards	10.4	NWI	Adelaide	11 Dec 94
100 Metres	11.12	+1.9	Sestriere	31 Jul 94
200 Metres	22.23	+0.8	Stuttgart	13 Jul 97
400 Metres	51.73		Brisbane	22 Jul 00

Personal Bests – indoor

Event	Time	City	Date
60 Metres	7.36	Toronto	Mar 93
200 Metres	22.64	Barcelona	10 Mar 95

== National records ==
Outdoor

Event	Time	City	Date
100 Metres	11.12	Sestriere	31 Jul 94
200 Metres	22.32	Hobart	26 Feb 94
	22.23	Stuttgart	13 Jul 97

Relays

Event	Time	City	Date	Team
4 × 100 Metres relay	42.99	Pietersburg	18 Mar 00	Rachael Massey, Suzanne Broadrick, Jodi Lambert
4 × 400 Metres relay	3-23.81	Sydney	30 Sep 00	Nova Peris, Tamsyn Lewis, Cathy Freeman

Indoor

Event	Time	City	Date
200 Metres	23.16	Toronto	Mar 93
200 Metres	22.83	Toronto	Mar 93
200 Metres	22.73	Toronto	Mar 93
200 Metres	22.64	Barcelona	11 Mar 95
200 Metres	22.64	Barcelona	11 Mar 95
