= Nicole Devonish =

Canadian long jumper (born 1973)

Personal information
- Born: 24 August 1973 (age 53) Toronto, Ontario, Canada

Sport
- Sport: Athletics
- Event: Long jump

Nicole Devonish Gilmore (born 24 August 1973) is a Canadian athlete. She competed in the women's long jump at the 1996 Summer Olympics.

Devonish competed for the Texas Longhorns track and field team in the NCAA.
