= 1992 World Junior Championships in Athletics =

International athletics competition

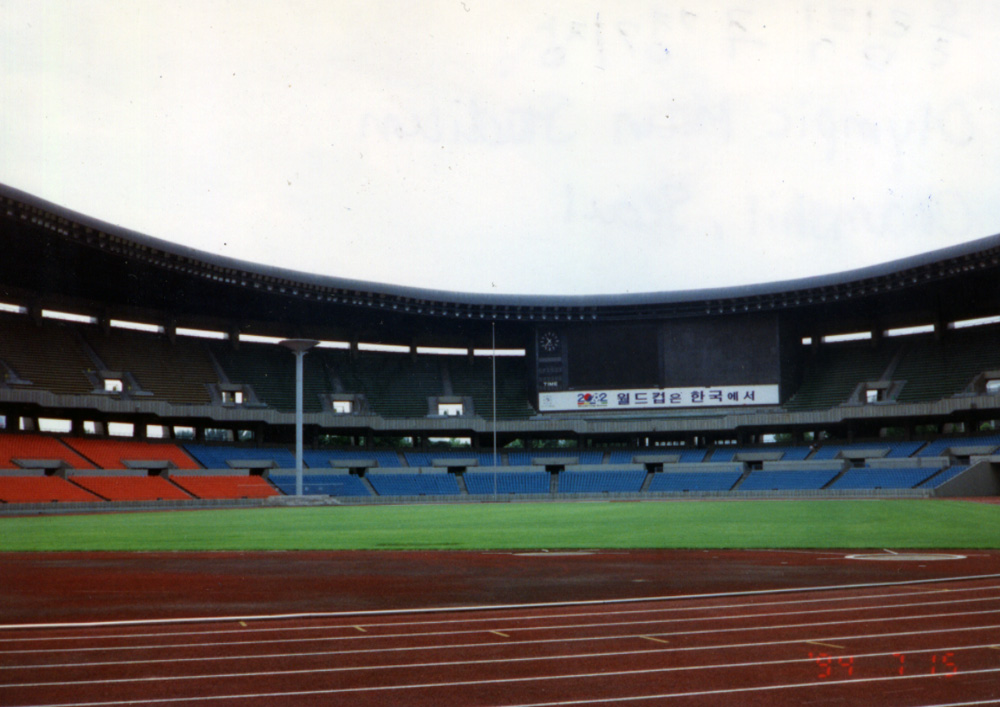
- The host stadium in Seoul
- Host city: Seoul, South Korea
- Nations: 90
- Athletes: 954
- Events: 41
- Dates: 16–20 September
- Main venue: Seoul Olympic Stadium

The 1992 World Junior Championships in Athletics was the fourth edition of the international athletics competition for athletes aged 19 years or under. It was held in Seoul, South Korea from September 16 to September 20, 1992.

== Results ==
=== Men ===
Event	Gold		Silver		Bronze	
100 metres	Ato Boldon; Trinidad and Tobago	10.30	Darren Campbell; Great Britain	10.46	Tony McCall; United States	10.49
200 metres	Ato Boldon; Trinidad and Tobago	20.63	Darren Campbell; Great Britain	20.87	Glen Elferink; South Africa	21.00
400 metres	Deon Minor; United States	45.75	Rikard Rasmusson; Sweden	46.07	Francis Ogola; Uganda	46.16
800 metres	Benson Koech; Kenya	1:44.77 CR	Lee Jin-Il; South Korea	1:46.34	Brendan Hanigan; Australia	1:47.26
1500 metres	Atoi Boru; Kenya	3:37.94 CR	Vénuste Niyongabo; Burundi	3:38.59	Kevin Sullivan; Canada	3:39.11
5000 metres	Haile Gebrselassie; Ethiopia	13:36.06 CR	Ismael Kirui; Kenya	13:36.11	Hicham El Guerrouj; Morocco	13:46.79
10,000 metres	Haile Gebrselassie; Ethiopia	28:03.99 CR	Josphat Ndeti; Kenya	28:46.95	Yasuyuki Watanabe; Japan	28:52.89
110 metres hurdles	Yevgeniy Pechonkin; Unified Team	13.87	Sven Göhler; Germany	13.98	Igor Pintusevich-Babichev; Unified Team	14.08
400 metres hurdles	Ashraf Saber; Italy	50.02	Sammy Biwot; Kenya	50.75	William Porter; United States	51.37
3000 metres steeplechase	Mwangangi Muindi; Kenya	8:31.62	Ayele Mezgebu; Ethiopia	8:32.43	Stephen Chepseba; Kenya	8:32:48
10,000 metres walk	Jefferson Pérez; Ecuador	40:42.66	Jacek Müller; Poland	40:50.82	Grzegorz Müller; Poland	41:12.28
4 × 100 metres relay	Great Britain; Allyn Condon; Darren Campbell; Jamie Baulch; Jason Fergus	39.21	United States; George Page; Milton Mallard; Tony McCall; Curtis Johnson	39.59	Nigeria; Tony Ogbeta; Deji Aliu; Uche Olisa; Paul Egonye	39.88
4 × 400 metres relay	United States; William Porter; Milton Mallard; Regan Nichols; Deon Minor	3:06.11	Jamaica; Greg Haughton; Edward Clarke; Davian Clarke; Carl McPherson	3:06.58	Japan; Hiroyuki Hayashi; Tadashi Nishihata; Tomonari Ono; Takayuki Sudo	3:06.66
High jump	Steve Smith; Great Britain	2.37 =CR	Tim Forsyth; Australia	2.31	Takahiro Kimino; Japan	2.29
Pole vault	Laurens Looije; Netherlands	5.45	Daniel Martí; Spain	5.40	Okkert Brits; South Africa	5.40
Long jump	Neil Chance; United States	7.89	Robert Thomas; United States	7.84	Ivaylo Mladenov; Bulgaria	7.68
Triple jump	Yoelbi Quesada; Cuba	17.04 CR	Osiris Mora; Cuba	17.03	Ndabazinhle Mdhlongwa; Zimbabwe	16.57
Shot put	Yuriy Bilonog; Unified Team	18.46	Manuel Martínez; Spain	18.14	Ralf Kahles; Germany	17.97
Discus throw	Brian Milne; United States	58.28	Frits Potgieter; South Africa	56.28	Marek Bílek; Czechoslovakia	54.86
Javelin throw	Aki Parviainen; Finland	76.34	Boris Henry; Germany	76.04	Kostas Gatsioudis; Greece	75.92
Hammer throw	Vadym Hrabovoyy; Unified Team	73.00 CR	Alberto Sánchez; Cuba	69.78	Andrey Yevgenyev; Unified Team	69.24
Decathlon	Raúl Duany; Cuba	7403	Bernhard Floder; Germany	7397	Remco van Veldhuizen; Netherlands	7313
WR world record | AR area record | CR championship record | GR games record | NR national record | OR Olympic record | PB personal best | SB season best | WL world leading (in a given season)

=== Women ===
Event	Gold		Silver		Bronze	
100 metres	Nikole Mitchell; Jamaica	11.30	Jacqueline Poelman; Netherlands	11.44	Merlene Frazer; Jamaica	11.49
200 metres	Hu Ling; China	23.14	Cathy Freeman; Australia	23.25	Merlene Frazer; Jamaica	23.29
400 metres	Magdalena Nedelcu; Romania	51.84	Claudine Williams; Jamaica	52.03	Ionela Târlea; Romania	52.13
800 metres	Lü Yi; China	2:02.91	Chen Yumei; China	2:03.14	Kati Kovacs; Germany	2:03.81
1500 metres	Liu Dong; China	4:05.14 CR	Jackline Maranga; Kenya	4:08.79	Li Ying; China	4:09.04
3000 metres	Zhang Linli; China	8:46.86 CR	Gabriela Szabo; Romania	8:48.28	Zhang Lirong; China	8:48.45
10,000 metres	Wang Junxia; China	32:29.90	Gete Wami; Ethiopia	32:41.57	Sally Barsosio; Kenya	32:41.76
100 metres hurdles	Gillian Russell; Jamaica	13.21	Damaris Anderson; Cuba	13.43	Svetlana Laukhova; Unified Team	13.55
400 metres hurdles	Georgeta Petrea; Romania	58.03	Erica Peterson; Canada	58.09	Wynsome Cole; Jamaica	58.15
5000 metres walk	Gao Hongmiao; China	21:20.03 CR	Jane Saville; Australia	21:58.64	Mika Ikatura; Japan	22:25.58
4 × 100 metres relay	Jamaica; Gillian Russell; Merlene Frazer; Michelle Christie; Nikole Mitchell	43.96	United States; Benita Kelley; Zundra Feagin; Lesa Parker; Marion Jones	44.51	Germany; Katja Seidel; Gabi Rockmeier; Birgit Rockmeier; Silke Lichtenhagen	44.52
4 × 400 metres relay	Romania; Georgeta Petrea; Mariana Florea; Ionela Tîrlea; Maria Magdalena Nedelcu	3:31.57	Jamaica; Debbie-Ann Parris; Catherine Scott; Ellen Grant; Claudine Williams	3:32.68	Germany; Imke Köhler; Wiebke Steffen; Anita Oppong; Silvia Steimle	3:32.72
High jump	Manuela Aigner; Germany	1.93	Ina Gliznuta; Unified Team; Svetlana Zalevskaya; Unified Team	1.88	None awarded	None awarded
Long jump	Erica Johansson; Sweden	6.65	Nicole Devonish; Canada	6.43	Yu Huaxiu; China	6.26
Triple jump	Anja Vokuhl; Germany	13.47	Yamina Martínez; Cuba	13.42	Olena Hovorova; Unified Team	13.29
Shot put	Wang Yawen; China	18.05	Zhang Zhiying; China	18.03	Olga Ilyina; Unified Team	17.20
Discus throw	Bao Dongying; China	58.34	Zhang Cuilan; China	57.10	Sabine Fried; Germany	53.94
Javelin throw	Claudia Isaila; Romania	63.04	Yvonne Reichardt; Germany	61.48	Heli Tolkkinen; Finland	60.12
Heptathlon	Natalya Sazanovich; Unified Team	6038	Kathleen Gutjahr; Germany	5668	Regla Cárdenas; Cuba	5602
WR world record | AR area record | CR championship record | GR games record | NR national record | OR Olympic record | PB personal best | SB season best | WL world leading (in a given season)

== Medal table ==
Rank	Nation	Gold	Silver	Bronze	Total
1	China (CHN)	8	3	3	14
2	United States (USA)	4	3	2	9
3	Unified Team	4	2	5	11
4	Romania (ROM)	4	1	1	6
5	Kenya (KEN)	3	4	2	9
6	Jamaica (JAM)	3	3	3	9
7	Germany (GER)	2	5	5	12
8	Cuba (CUB)	2	4	1	7
9	Ethiopia (ETH)	2	2	0	4
9	Great Britain (GBR)	2	2	0	4
11	Trinidad and Tobago (TRI)	2	0	0	2
12	Netherlands (NED)	1	1	1	3
13	Sweden (SWE)	1	1	0	2
14	Finland (FIN)	1	0	1	2
15	Ecuador (ECU)	1	0	0	1
15	Italy (ITA)	1	0	0	1
17	Australia (AUS)	0	3	1	4
18	Canada (CAN)	0	2	1	3
19	Spain (ESP)	0	2	0	2
20	South Africa (RSA)	0	1	2	3
21	Poland (POL)	0	1	1	2
22	Burundi (BDI)	0	1	0	1
22	South Korea (KOR)	0	1	0	1
24	Japan (JPN)	0	0	4	4
25	Bulgaria (BUL)	0	0	1	1
25	Czechoslovakia (TCH)	0	0	1	1
25	Greece (GRE)	0	0	1	1
25	Morocco (MAR)	0	0	1	1
25	Nigeria (NGR)	0	0	1	1
25	Uganda (UGA)	0	0	1	1
25	Zimbabwe (ZIM)	0	0	1	1
Totals (31 entries)		41	42	40	123

== Participation ==
According to an unofficial count through an unofficial result list, 954 athletes from 90 countries participated in the event. This is in agreement with the official numbers as published.

- Algeria (3)
- Argentina (6)
- Australia (45)
- Austria (6)
- Bahamas (1)
- Bangladesh (1)
- Barbados (3)
- Belgium (9)
- Bolivia (1)
- Bosnia and Herzegovina (1)
- Botswana (2)
- Brazil (22)
- British Virgin Islands (1)
- Bulgaria (14)
- Burundi (2)
- Canada (20)
- Chile (3)
- China (33)
- Chinese Taipei (6)
- Colombia (2)
- Ivory Coast (1)
- Croatia (2)
- Cuba (29)
- Cyprus (6)
- Czechoslovakia (18)
- Denmark (1)
- Ecuador (4)
- Ethiopia (15)
- Fiji (1)
- Finland (16)
- France (17)
- Germany (70)
- Gibraltar (2)
- Great Britain (39)
- Greece (13)
- Grenada (1)
- Guatemala (3)
- Hong Kong (2)
- Hungary (14)
- FR Yugoslavia (3)
- Indonesia (1)
- Ireland (5)
- Israel (2)
- Italy (34)
- Jamaica (25)
- Japan (57)
- Kenya (20)
- Kuwait (1)
- Latvia (3)
- Lithuania (4)
- Malaysia (1)
- Mexico (9)
- Morocco (3)
- Namibia (1)
- Netherlands (10)
- New Zealand (18)
- Nigeria (16)
- Norway (10)
- Papua New Guinea (1)
- Paraguay (1)
- Peru (3)
- Poland (13)
- Portugal (10)
- Qatar (3)
- Romania (20)
- Saint Vincent and the Grenadines (1)
- Saudi Arabia (5)
- Senegal (2)
- Seychelles (2)
- Sierra Leone (2)
- Singapore (1)
- Slovenia (10)
- South Africa (12)
- South Korea (41)
- Spain (31)
- Suriname (1)
- Sweden (15)
- Switzerland (9)
- Tanzania (6)
- Thailand (1)
- Trinidad and Tobago (1)
- Tunisia (1)
- Turkey (6)
- Uganda (2)
- Unified Team (48)
- United States (43)
- Uruguay (1)
- Venezuela (2)
- Zambia (1)
- Zimbabwe (1)

== See also ==
- 1992 in athletics (track and field)
