= Zundra Feagin-Alexander =

American sprinter

Zundra Feagin-Alexander (born July 12, 1973) is an American sprinter. At the 1999 IAAF World Indoor Championships, she was a member of the bronze medalist team in the 4 × 400 m relay, along with her teammates Monique Hennagan, Michelle Collins, and Shanelle Porter. She also twice represented the United States at the World Championships in Athletics. She won the 200 m race in the 1999 USA Indoor Track and Field Championships.

She attended Cocoa High School in Cocoa, Florida. After one year at University of Nevada, Las Vegas, she moved to Louisiana State University and won the 200 m NCAA Outdoor title in 1996. She graduated that year with a bachelor's degree in Speech Communications. After her retirement from competitive sports, she gained a masters and a doctorate in education at Nova Southeastern University. She became principal at Westside K-8 School in Kissimmee.
