= List of Jamaican Athletics Championships winners =

The Jamaican Athletics Championships is an annual outdoor track and field competition organised by the Jamaica Athletics Administrative Association, which serves as the national championship for the sport in Jamaica.

== Men ==
=== 100 metres ===
- 1983: Everard Samuels
- 1984: Ray Stewart
- 1985: ????
- 1986: Ray Stewart
- 1987: Ray Stewart
- 1988: Ray Stewart
- 1989: Ray Stewart
- 1990: John Mair
- 1991: Ray Stewart
- 1992: Ray Stewart
- 1993: Michael Green
- 1994: Michael Green
- 1995: Michael Green
- 1996: Michael Green
- 1997: Percy Spencer
- 1998: Garth Robinson
- 1999: Patrick Jarrett
- 2000: Lindel Frater
- 2001: Christopher Williams
- 2002: Dwight Thomas
- 2003: Asafa Powell
- 2004: Asafa Powell
- 2005: Asafa Powell
- 2006: Michael Frater
- 2007: Asafa Powell
- 2008: Usain Bolt
- 2009: Usain Bolt
- 2010: Oshane Bailey
- 2011: Asafa Powell
- 2012: Yohan Blake
- 2013: Usain Bolt
- 2014: Nickel Ashmeade
- 2015: Asafa Powell
- 2016: Yohan Blake
- 2017: Yohan Blake
- 2018: Tyquendo Tracey
- 2019: Yohan Blake
- 2020: Not Held: COVID-19 pandemic
- 2021: Tyquendo Tracey
- 2022: Yohan Blake
- 2023: Rohan Watson
- 2024: Kishane Thompson
- 2025: Kishane Thompson
- 2026: Oblique Seville

=== 200 metres ===
- 1983: Leroy Reid
- 1984: Gus Young
- 1985: ????
- 1986: Leroy Reid
- 1987: Clive Wright
- 1988: Clive Wright
- 1989: Clive Wright
- 1990: ????
- 1991: Windell Dobson
- 1992: Clive Wright
- 1993: Ray Stewart
- 1994: Garth Robinson
- 1995: Percy Spencer
- 1996: Percy Spencer
- 1997: Percy Spencer
- 1998: Garth Robinson
- 1999: Christopher Williams
- 2000: Christopher Williams
- 2001: Christopher Williams
- 2002: Dwight Thomas
- 2003: Usain Bolt
- 2004: Steve Mullings
- 2005: Usain Bolt
- 2006: Asafa Powell
- 2007: Usain Bolt
- 2008: Usain Bolt
- 2009: Usain Bolt
- 2010: Asafa Powell
- 2011: Nickel Ashmeade
- 2012: Yohan Blake
- 2013: Warren Weir
- 2014: Rasheed Dwyer
- 2015: Nickel Ashmeade
- 2016: Yohan Blake
- 2017: Yohan Blake
- 2018: Jahnoy Thompson
- 2019: Rasheed Dwyer
- 2020: ????
- 2021: Rasheed Dwyer
- 2022: Andrew Hudson
- 2023: Andrew Hudson
- 2024: Bryan Levell
- 2025: Bryan Levell
- 2026: Christopher Taylor

=== 400 metres ===
- 1983: Bert Cameron
- 1984: Bert Cameron
- 1985: ?
- 1986: Bert Cameron
- 1987: Bert Cameron
- 1988: Bert Cameron
- 1989: Howard Davis
- 1990: Howard Burnett
- 1991: Bert Cameron
- 1992: Anthony Wallace
- 1993: Dennis Blake
- 1994: Greg Haughton
- 1995: Greg Haughton
- 1996: Davian Clarke
- 1997: Roxbert Martin
- 1998: Roxbert Martin
- 1999: Greg Haughton
- 2000: Greg Haughton
- 2001: Michael McDonald
- 2002: Michael Blackwood
- 2003: Michael Blackwood
- 2004: Brandon Simpson
- 2005: Lansford Spence
- 2006: Ricardo Chambers

=== 800 metres ===
- 1991: Delroy Hayden
- 1992: Clive Terrelonge
- 1993: Clive Terrelonge
- 1994: Mario Vernon-Watson
- 1995: Alex Morgan
- 1996: Alex Morgan
- 1997: Alex Morgan
- 1998: Alex Morgan
- 1999: Mario Vernon-Watson
- 2000: Marvin Watts
- 2001: Marvin Watts
- 2002: Marvin Watts
- 2003: Jermaine Myers
- 2004: Aldwyn Sappleton
- 2005: Aldwyn Sappleton
- 2006: Evan Allen

=== 1500 metres ===
- 1991: Linton McKenzie
- 1992: Linton McKenzie
- 1993: Linton McKenzie
- 1994: Steve Green
- 1995: Cleon Spencer
- 1996: Oral Robertson
- 1997: Milton Sergeant
- 1998: Steve Green
- 1999: Steve Green
- 2000: Omar Fagan
- 2001: Courtney Chambers
- 2002: Michael Tomlin
- 2003: Mario Smith
- 2004: Shawn Pitter
- 2005: Alex Morgan
- 2006: Kerone Fairweather

=== 5000 metres ===
- 1991: Linton McKenzie
- 1992: Jermaine Mitchell
- 1993: Norval Jones
- 1994: ?
- 1995: Linton McKenzie
- 1996: Jermaine Mitchell
- 1997: Linton McKenzie
- 1998: ?
- 1999: Michael Tomlin
- 2000: Kevin Campbell
- 2001: Michael Tomlin
- 2002: Michael Tomlin
- 2003: Andrew Gutzmore
- 2004: Lawrence Mendez
- 2005: Wainard Talbert
- 2006: Wainard Talbert

=== 10,000 metres ===
- 1991: Mike Feurtado
- 1992: Kenneth Richards
- 1993: Oral Anderson
- 1994: ?
- 1995: ?
- 1996: Nils Antonio
- 1997: ?
- 1998: ?
- 1999: Hector Richards
- 2000: Kevin Webb
- 2001: Kevin Webb
- 2002: Kevin Webb
- 2003: Andrew Gutzmore
- 2004: Andrew Gutzmore
- 2005: Wainard Talbert
- 2006: Wainard Talbert
- 2024: Jason Baker

=== 3000 metres steeplechase ===
- 1993: Preston Campbell

=== 110 metres hurdles ===
- 1991: Richard Bucknor
- 1992: Richard Bucknor
- 1993: Andrew Parker
- 1994: Robert Foster
- 1995: Robert Foster
- 1996: Robert Foster
- 1997: Maurice Wignall
- 1998: Greg Hines
- 1999: Maurice Wignall
- 2000: Robert Foster
- 2001: Maurice Wignall
- 2002: Maurice Wignall
- 2003: Maurice Wignall
- 2004: Maurice Wignall
- 2005: Maurice Wignall
- 2006: Decosma Wright

=== 400 metres hurdles ===
- 1991: Winthrop Graham
- 1992: Winthrop Graham
- 1993: Winthrop Graham
- 1994: Mitchell Francis
- 1995: Winthrop Graham
- 1996: Dinsdale Morgan
- 1997: Dinsdale Morgan
- 1998: Dinsdale Morgan
- 1999: Kemel Thompson
- 2000: Kemel Thompson
- 2001: Ian Weakley
- 2002: Kemel Thompson
- 2003: Danny McFarlane
- 2004: Danny McFarlane
- 2005: Kemel Thompson
- 2006: Danny McFarlane

=== High jump ===
- 1991: Dennis Fearon
- 1992: Ruel James
- 1993: Dennis Fearon
- 1994: Dennis Fearon
- 1995: Enrico Gordon
- 1996: Garfield Baker
- 1997: Enrico Gordon
- 1998: ?
- 1999: Craig Norman
- 2000: Germaine Mason
- 2001: Claston Bernard
- 2002: Germaine Mason
- 2003: Germaine Mason
- 2004: Henderson Dottin (BAR)
- 2005: Germaine Mason
- 2006: Not held

=== Pole vault ===
- 1991: ?
- 1992: Junior Collins
- 1993: Shawn Cousins
- 1994: Clinton Gordon
- 1995: ?
- 1996: ?
- 1997: ?
- 1998: ?
- 1999: Omar Gardiner
- 2000: Fenton McDuffus
- 2001: Jabari Ennis
- 2002: Joseph Dickens
- 2003: Jabari Ennis
- 2004: Jabari Ennis
- 2005: Dwayne Brown
- 2006: Not held

=== Long jump ===
- 1991: Ron Chambers
- 1992: Robert Foster
- 1993: Neil Gardner
- 1994: Ron Chambers
- 1995: James Beckford
- 1996: James Beckford
- 1997: James Beckford
- 1998: James Beckford
- 1999: Maurice Wignall
- 2000: James Beckford
- 2001: Antholow Dawkins
- 2002: James Beckford
- 2003: Aundre Edwards
- 2004: James Beckford
- 2005: James Beckford
- 2006: Herbert McGregor

=== Triple jump ===
- 1991: Jerome Douglas
- 1992: Ron Chambers
- 1993: Jerome Douglas
- 1994: Anthony Williams
- 1995: James Beckford
- 1996: Jerome Douglas
- 1997: Jerome Douglas
- 1998: ?
- 1999: Lancelot Gooden
- 2000: Nicholas Neufville
- 2001: Noel Comrie
- 2002: Noel Comrie
- 2003: Bernard Shirley
- 2004: Wilbert Walker
- 2005: Wilbert Walker
- 2006: Wilbert Walker

=== Shot put ===
- 1991: Robert Holdsworth
- 1992: Robert Holdsworth
- 1993: Howard Brown
- 1994: ?
- 1995: Dave Grant
- 1996: Arthur Compass
- 1997: Robert Holdsworth
- 1998: ?
- 1999: Kevin Brown
- 2000: Rory Marsh
- 2001: Maurice Smith
- 2002: Jason Morgan
- 2003: Dorian Scott
- 2004: Dorian Scott
- 2005: Dorian Scott
- 2006: Dorian Scott

=== Discus throw ===
- 1991: ?
- 1992: Oral Grant
- 1993: Howard Brown
- 1994: Linval Swaby
- 1995: Dave Grant
- 1996: Linval Swaby
- 1997: ?
- 1998: ?
- 1999: Kevin Brown
- 2000: Kevin Brown
- 2001: Maurice Smith
- 2002: Kevin Brown
- 2003: Claston Bernard
- 2004: Dwayne Henclewood
- 2005: Maurice Smith
- 2006: Not held

=== Hammer throw ===
- 1994: John Paul Clarke
- 2003: Richard Wright

=== Javelin throw ===
- 1991: ?
- 1992: Oral Grant
- 1993: Raymond Passley
- 1994: Victor Houston (BAR)
- 1995: Hubert Knight
- 1996: Raymond Passley
- 1997: Christopher Wilson
- 1998: ?
- 1999: Rudolph Currie
- 2000: Maurice Smith
- 2001: Kevin Bennett
- 2002: Not held
- 2003: Robert Barnes
- 2004: Robert Barnes
- 2005: Not held
- 2006: Miekael Downer

=== Decathlon ===
- 2002: Decosma Wright

== Women ==
=== 100 metres ===
- 1983: Leleith Hodges
- 1984: Grace Jackson
- 1985: ?
- 1986: Camille Coates
- 1987: Vivienne Spence
- 1988: Merlene Ottey
- 1989: Andria Lloyd
- 1990: Juliet Campbell
- 1991: Merlene Ottey
- 1992: Juliet Cuthbert
- 1993: Merlene Ottey
- 1994: Dahlia Duhaney
- 1995: Merlene Ottey
- 1996: Merlene Ottey
- 1997: Merlene Ottey
- 1998: Beverly McDonald
- 1999: Peta-Gaye Dowdie
- 2000: Peta-Gaye Dowdie
- 2001: Aleen Bailey
- 2002: Veronica Campbell Brown
- 2003: Aleen Bailey
- 2004: Veronica Campbell Brown
- 2005: Veronica Campbell Brown
- 2006: Sherone Simpson
- 2007: Veronica Campbell Brown
- 2008: Kerron Stewart
- 2009: Shelly-Ann Fraser-Pryce
- 2010: Sherone Simpson
- 2011: Veronica Campbell Brown
- 2012: Shelly-Ann Fraser-Pryce
- 2013: Kerron Stewart
- 2014: Veronica Campbell Brown
- 2015: Shelly-Ann Fraser-Pryce
- 2016: Elaine Thompson
- 2017: Elaine Thompson
- 2018: Elaine Thompson
- 2019: Elaine Thompson
- 2020: ????
- 2021: Shelly-Ann Fraser-Pryce
- 2022: Shericka Jackson
- 2023: Shericka Jackson

=== 200 metres ===
- 1983: Juliet Cuthbert
- 1984: Grace Jackson
- 1985: ?
- 1986: Grace Jackson
- 1987: Vivienne Spence
- 1988: Grace Jackson
- 1989: Grace Jackson
- 1990: ?
- 1991: Grace Jackson
- 1992: Merlene Ottey
- 1993: Merlene Ottey
- 1994: Merlene Frazer
- 1995: Juliet Cuthbert
- 1996: Merlene Ottey
- 1997: Juliet Cuthbert
- 1998: Beverly McDonald
- 1999: Beverly McDonald
- 2000: Beverly McDonald
- 2001: Aleen Bailey
- 2002: Beverly McDonald
- 2003: Aleen Bailey
- 2004: Veronica Campbell Brown
- 2005: Veronica Campbell Brown
- 2006: Sherone Simpson

=== 400 metres ===
- 1983: Cathy Rattray-Williams
- 1984: Cathy Rattray-Williams
- 1985: ?
- 1986: Ilrey Oliver
- 1987: Sandie Richards
- 1988: Sandie Richards
- 1989: Sandie Richards
- 1990: Juliet Campbell
- 1991: Sandie Richards
- 1992: Sandie Richards
- 1993: Juliet Campbell
- 1994: Sandie Richards
- 1995: Deon Hemmings
- 1996: Juliet Campbell
- 1997: Lorraine Fenton
- 1998: Sandie Richards
- 1999: Lorraine Fenton
- 2000: Lorraine Fenton
- 2001: Lorraine Fenton
- 2002: Lorraine Fenton
- 2003: Lorraine Fenton
- 2004: Nadia Davy
- 2005: Shericka Williams
- 2006: Novlene Williams-Mills

=== 800 metres ===
- 1991: Inez Turner
- 1992: Inez Turner
- 1993: Michelle Ballentine
- 1994: Charmaine Howell
- 1995: Inez Turner
- 1996: Mardrea Hyman
- 1997: Inez Turner
- 1998: Mardrea Hyman
- 1999: Charmaine Howell
- 2000: Charmaine Howell
- 2001: Charmaine Howell
- 2002: Charmaine Howell
- 2003: Michelle Ballentine
- 2004: Michelle Ballentine
- 2005: Kenia Sinclair
- 2006: Kenia Sinclair

=== 1500 metres ===
- 1991: Janice Turner
- 1992: Mardrea Hyman
- 1993: Janice Turner
- 1994: Janice Turner
- 1995: Yvonne Mai-Graham
- 1996: Mardrea Hyman
- 1997: Mardrea Hyman
- 1998: Mardrea Hyman
- 1999: ?
- 2000: Tanice Bennett
- 2001: Mardrea Hyman
- 2002: Mardrea Hyman
- 2003: Not held
- 2004: Mardrea Hyman
- 2005: Nicola Maye
- 2006: Kenia Sinclair

=== 3000 metres ===
- 1991: Evette Turner
- 1992: Evette Turner
- 1993: Not held
- 1994: Not held
- 1995: Not held
- 1996: Not held
- 1997: Not held
- 1998: Not held
- 1999: Not held
- 2000: Not held
- 2001: Not held
- 2002: Anieta Martin
- 2003: Anieta Martin
- 2004: Not held
- 2005: Not held
- 2006: Not held

=== 3000 metres steeplechase ===
- 2005: Mardrea Hyman

=== 100 metres hurdles ===
- 1991: Michelle Freeman
- 1992: Michelle Freeman
- 1993: Michelle Freeman
- 1994: Michelle Freeman
- 1995: Gillian Russell
- 1996: Dionne Rose-Henley
- 1997: Michelle Freeman
- 1998: Dionne Rose-Henley
- 1999: Delloreen Ennis-London
- 2000: Delloreen Ennis-London
- 2001: Delloreen Ennis-London
- 2002: Brigitte Foster-Hylton
- 2003: Brigitte Foster-Hylton
- 2004: Delloreen Ennis-London
- 2005: Delloreen Ennis-London & Brigitte Foster-Hylton
- 2006: Brigitte Foster-Hylton

=== 400 metres hurdles ===
- 1991: Deon Hemmings
- 1992: Deon Hemmings
- 1993: Deon Hemmings
- 1994: Deon Hemmings
- 1995: Deon Hemmings
- 1996: Deon Hemmings
- 1997: Deon Hemmings
- 1998: Deon Hemmings
- 1999: Deon Hemmings
- 2000: Deon Hemmings
- 2001: Debbie Parris-Thymes
- 2002: Debbie Parris-Thymes
- 2003: Allison Beckford
- 2004: Debbie Parris-Thymes
- 2005: Debbie Parris-Thymes
- 2006: Melaine Walker

=== High jump ===
- 1991: Diane Guthrie-Gresham
- 1992: Karen Beautle
- 1993: Karen Beautle
- 1994: Natalie Richardson
- 1995: Magon Moncrieffe
- 1996: Diane Guthrie-Gresham
- 1997: Karen Beautle
- 1998: Karen Beautle
- 1999: Karen Beautle
- 2000: Sheree Francis
- 2001: Maresa Cadienhead
- 2002: Karen Beautle
- 2003: Peaches Roach
- 2004: Karen Beautle
- 2005: Sheree Francis
- 2006: Karen Beautle

=== Pole vault ===
- 2000: Maria Newton
- 2001: Sande Swaby

=== Long jump ===
- 1991: Diane Guthrie-Gresham
- 1992: Diane Guthrie-Gresham
- 1993: Dionne Rose-Henley
- 1994: Lacena Golding-Clarke
- 1995: Dionne Rose-Henley
- 1996: Lacena Golding-Clarke
- 1997: Lacena Golding-Clarke
- 1998: Lacena Golding-Clarke
- 1999: Lacena Golding-Clarke
- 2000: Elva Goulborne
- 2001: Elva Goulborne
- 2002: Elva Goulborne
- 2003: Elva Goulborne
- 2004: Elva Goulborne
- 2005: Elva Goulborne
- 2006: Nolle Graham

=== Triple jump ===
- 1991: Dione Sommerville
- 1992: Dione Sommerville
- 1993: Suzette Lee
- 1994: Suzette Lee
- 1995: Icolyn Kelly
- 1996: Suzette Lee
- 1997: Suzette Lee
- 1998: Suzette Lee
- 1999: Suzette Lee
- 2000: Keisha Spencer
- 2001: Trecia-Kaye Smith
- 2002: Trecia-Kaye Smith
- 2003: Suzette Lee
- 2004: Trecia-Kaye Smith
- 2005: Trecia-Kaye Smith
- 2006: Andrea Linton

=== Shot put ===
- 1991: Olivia McKoy
- 1992: Diane Guthrie-Gresham
- 1993: Cecilia Clarke
- 1994: ?
- 1995: Lesa-Gaye Francis
- 1996: Lesa-Gaye Francis
- 1997: ?
- 1998: ?
- 1999: Olivia McKoy
- 2000: Melissa Gibbons
- 2001: Not held
- 2002: Melissa Gibbons
- 2003: Kimberly Barrett
- 2004: Kimberly Barrett
- 2005: Kimberly Barrett
- 2006: Zara Northover

=== Discus throw ===
- 1991: Jacinth Smith
- 1992: Maxine McKenzie
- 1993: Cecilia Clarke
- 1994: Grettel Miller
- 1995: Tumara Dayes
- 1996: Melonie Burke
- 1997: ?
- 1998: ?
- 1999: Natalia Brown
- 2000: Melissa Gibbons
- 2001: Angella Mitchell
- 2002: Melissa Gibbons
- 2003: Kesheila Reid
- 2004: Kesheila Reid
- 2005: Kesheila Reid
- 2006: Phelecia Reynolds

=== Hammer throw ===
- 2002: Natalie Grant
- 2003: Natalie Grant
- 2004: Natalie Grant
- 2005: Natalie Grant
- 2006: Natalie Grant

=== Javelin throw ===
- 1991: Erica Donaldson
- 1992: Olivia McKoy
- 1993: Olivia McKoy
- 1994:
- 1995: Diane Guthrie-Gresham
- 1996: Diane Guthrie-Gresham
- 1997: Olivia McKoy
- 1998: Olivia McKoy
- 1999: Olivia McKoy
- 2000: Olivia McKoy
- 2001: Brenda-Grace Hunt
- 2002: Kateema Riettie
- 2003: Kateema Riettie
- 2004: Olivia McKoy
- 2005: Olivia McKoy
- 2006: Olivia McKoy
- 2007 Olivia McKoy
- .2008 Olivia McKoy
- 2009
- 2010
- 2011 Olivia McKoy
- 2012

=== Heptathlon ===
- 1991: Maria Brown
- 1999: Neisha Thompson
- 2000: Neisha Thompson
