= Jamaica at the 1996 Summer Olympics =

- IOC code: JAM
- NOC: Jamaica Olympic Association
- Website: www.joa.org.jm

in Atlanta
- Competitors: 46 (27 men and 19 women) in 5 sports
- Flag bearer: Juliet Cuthbert
- Medals Ranked 39th: Gold 1 Silver 3 Bronze 2 Total 6

Summer Olympics appearances (overview)
- 1948; 1952; 1956; 1960; 1964; 1968; 1972; 1976; 1980; 1984; 1988; 1992; 1996; 2000; 2004; 2008; 2012; 2016; 2020; 2024

Other related appearances
- British West Indies (1960 S)

Jamaica competed at the 1996 Summer Olympics in Atlanta, United States.

== Medalists ==
Medal	Name	Sport	Event	Date
Gold	Deon Hemmings	Athletics	Women's 400 metres hurdles	31 July
Silver	Merlene Ottey	Athletics	Women's 100 metres	27 July
Silver	James Beckford	Athletics	Men's long jump	29 July
Silver	Merlene Ottey	Athletics	Women's 200 metres	1 August
Bronze	Michelle Freeman; Juliet Cuthbert; Nikole Mitchell; Merlene Ottey; Andria Lloyd (heats); Gillian Russell (heats)	Athletics	Women's 4 × 100 metres relay	3 August
Bronze	Michael McDonald; Roxbert Martin; Greg Haughton; Davian Clarke; Dennis Blake (heats); Garth Robinson (heats)	Athletics	Men's 4 × 400 metres relay	3 August

== Competitors ==
The following is the list of number of competitors in the Games.

Sport	Men	Women	Total
Athletics	19	19	38
Boxing	3	–	3
Sailing	2	0	2
Swimming	1	0	1
Table tennis	2	0	2
Total	27	19	46

== Athletics ==
Men
Track and road events

Athlete	Event	Heats		Quarterfinal		Semifinal		Final	
Athlete	Event	Result	Rank	Result	Rank	Result	Rank	Result	Rank
Leon Gordon	100 metres	10.48	46	Did not advance					
Michael Green	100 metres	10.16	6 Q	10.11	8 Q	10.11	8 Q	10.16	7
Ray Stewart	100 metres	10.38	35 q	10.18	17	Did not advance			
Elston Cawley	200 metres	20.73	23 Q	20.75	27	Did not advance			
Percival Spencer	200 metres	20.73	23 Q	20.59	18	Did not advance			
Davian Clarke	400 metres	45.54	10 Q	44.98	8 Q	44.87	5 Q	44.99	7
Roxbert Martin	400 metres	46.01	28 q	44.74	3 Q	44.81	3 Q	44.83	6
Michael McDonald	400 metres	45.50	9 Q	45.26	13 Q	45.48	12	Did not advance	
Alex Morgan	800 metres	1:47.40	30	—N/a		Did not advance			
Clive Terrelonge	800 metres	1:48.29	37	—N/a		Did not advance			
Nils Antonio	Marathon	—N/a						2:44:10	104
Robert Foster	110 metres hurdles	13.58	14 Q	13.51	12 Q	13.49	10	Did not advance	
Neil Gardner	400 metres hurdles	48.59	6 q	—N/a		48.30	9	Did not advance	
Winthrop Graham	400 metres hurdles	DNF		—N/a		Did not advance			
Dinsdale Morgan	400 metres hurdles	49.16	21	—N/a		Did not advance			
Leon Gordon; Michael Green; Percival Spencer; Ray Stewart	4 × 100 metres relay	39.21	11 Q	—N/a		DQ		Did not advance	
Michael McDonald; Roxbert Martin; Greg Haughton; Davian Clarke; Dennis Blake (heats only); Garth Robinson (heats only)	4 × 100 metres relay	3:02.81	8 Q	—N/a		2:58.42	2 Q	2:59.42	3rd place, bronze medalist(s)

Field events

Athlete	Event	Qualification		Final	
Athlete	Event	Distance	Position	Distance	Position
James Beckford	Long jump	8.02	10 q	8.29	2nd place, silver medalist(s)

Women
Track and road events

Athlete	Event	Heats		Quarterfinal		Semifinal		Final	
Athlete	Event	Result	Rank	Result	Rank	Result	Rank	Result	Rank
Juliet Cuthbert	100 metres	11.06	2 Q	11.20	9 Q	11.07	9	Did not advance	
Beverly McDonald	100 metres	12.08	49	Did not advance					
Merlene Ottey	100 metres	11.13	5 Q	11.02	2 Q	10.93	1 Q	10.94	2nd place, silver medalist(s)
Juliet Cuthbert	200 metres	23.03	13 Q	22.62	7 Q	22.24	4 Q	22.60	7
Beverly McDonald	200 metres	23.04	14 Q	DNS		Did not advance			
Merlene Ottey	200 metres	22.92	10 Q	22.61	6 Q	22.08	2 Q	22.24	2nd place, silver medalist(s)
Juliet Campbell	400 metres	51.57	6 Q	51.17	10 Q	51.65	16	Did not advance	
Merlene Frazer	400 metres	52.20	20 Q	51.57	16 Q	51.18	12	Did not advance	
Sandie Richards	400 metres	51.79	10 Q	51.22	11 Q	50.74	7 Q	50.45	7
Inez Turner	800 metres	2:01.48	21	—N/a		Did not advance			
Michelle Freeman	100 metres hurdles	12.76	4 Q	12.57	2 Q	12.61	3 Q	12.76	6
Dionne Rose	100 metres hurdles	12.81	5 Q	12.76	7 Q	12.64	6 Q	12.74	5
Gillian Russell	100 metres hurdles	12.85	7 Q	12.78	17	Did not advance			
Deon Hemmings	400 metres hurdles	54.70	1 Q	—N/a		52.99 OR	1	52.82 OR	1st place, gold medalist(s)
Debbie-Ann Parris	400 metres hurdles	55.64	10 Q	—N/a		54.72	8 Q	53.97	4
Catherine Scott	400 metres hurdles	56.21	20	—N/a		Did not advance			
Michelle Freeman; Juliet Cuthbert; Nikole Mitchell; Merlene Ottey; Andria Lloyd (heats only); Gillian Russell (heats only)	4 × 100 metres relay	43.36	5 Q	—N/a				42.24	3rd place, bronze medalist(s)
Merlene Frazer; Sandie Richards; Juliet Campbell; Deon Hemmings; Tracey Ann Barnes (heats only); Inez Turner (heats only)	4 × 400 metres relay	3:25.33	6 q	—N/a				3:21.69	4

Field events

Athlete	Event	Qualification		Final	
Athlete	Event	Distance	Position	Distance	Position
Lacena Golding	Long jump	NM		Did not advance	
Diane Guthrie-Gresham	Long jump	6.27	25	Did not advance	
Suzette Lee	Triple jump	13.65	19	Did not advance	

Combined event – Heptathlon

Athlete	Event	100H	HJ	SP	200 m	LJ	JT	800 m	Total	Rank
Diane Guthrie-Gresham	Result	14.17	1.80	12.88	25.12	6.57	40.32	2:17.55	6087	16
Diane Guthrie-Gresham	Points	954	978	719	876	1030	673	857	6087	16

== Boxing ==
Athlete	Event	Round of 32	Round of 16	Quarterfinals	Semifinals	Final	
Athlete	Event	Opposition Result	Opposition Result	Opposition Result	Opposition Result	Opposition Result	Rank
Tyson Gray	Featherweight	Chacón (ARG); L 5–6	Did not advance				
Sean Black	Light middleweight	Johnson (NOR); L 7–13	Did not advance				
Rowan Donaldson	Middleweight	Lebziak (RUS); L 4–20	Did not advance				

== Sailing ==
Men

Athlete	Event	Race											Net points	Final rank
Athlete	Event	1	2	3	4	5	6	7	8	9	10	11	Net points	Final rank
Andrew Gooding; Joseph Stockhausen	470	27	33	~~34~~	~~34~~	33	18	33	30	32	34	27	267	33

== Swimming ==
Men

Athlete	Event	Heats		Final A/B	
Athlete	Event	Time	Rank	Time	Rank
Sion Brinn	50 m freestyle	23.35	29	Did not advance	
Sion Brinn	100 m freestyle	50.38	17 FB	50.09	12

== Table Tennis ==
Men

Athlete	Event	Group Stage				Round of 16	Quarterfinal	Semifinal	Final	
Athlete	Event	Opposition Result	Opposition Result	Opposition Result	Rank	Opposition Result	Opposition Result	Opposition Result	Opposition Result	Rank
Michael Hyatt	Singles	Yoo (KOR); L 0–2	Ri (PRK); L 0–2	Karakašević (YUG); L 0–2	4	Did not advance				
Stephen Hylton	Singles	Samsonov (BLR); L 0–2	Mazunov (RUS); L 0–2	Prean (GBR); L 0–2	4	Did not advance				
Michael Hyatt; Stephen Hylton	Doubles	Éloi / Gatien (FRA); L 0–2	Lo / Chan (HKG); L 0–2	Ri / Choi (PRK); L 0–2	4	—N/a	Did not advance			

== See also ==
- Jamaica at the 1994 Commonwealth Games
- Jamaica at the 1995 Pan American Games
- Jamaica at the 1998 Commonwealth Games
