= 1990 CARIFTA Games =

XIX CARIFTA Games
- Dates: April 14–16
- Host city: Kingston, Jamaica
- Level: Junior and Youth
- Events: 52
- Participation: at least 122 athletes from at least 14 nations

The 19th CARIFTA Games was held in Kingston, Jamaica on April 14–16, 1990.

== Participation (unofficial) ==
For the 1990 CARIFTA Games only the medalists and a few other athletes can be found on the "World Junior Athletics History" website. An unofficial count yields the number of about 122 athletes (78 junior (under-20) and 44 youth (under-17)) from about 14 countries: Bahamas (22), Barbados (9), British Virgin Islands (2), Cayman Islands (2), Dominica (1), French Guiana (2), Grenada (5), Guadeloupe (5), Guyana (2), Jamaica (53), Martinique (9), Saint Lucia (1), Suriname (1), Trinidad and Tobago (8).

== Austin Sealy Award ==
The Austin Sealy Trophy for the most outstanding athlete of the games was awarded for the second time in the role to Kareem Streete-Thompson from the Cayman Islands. As in 1989, he won the gold medal in the long jump event, this year however in the junior (U-20) category, again with a remarkable jump of 7.94m, also being still the championships record in this category.

== Medal summary ==
Medal winners are published by category: Boys under 20 (Junior), Girls under 20 (Junior), Boys under 17 (Youth), and Girls under 17 (Youth). Results can be found on the "World Junior Athletics History" website.

=== Boys under 20 (Junior) ===
Event	Gold		Silver		Bronze	
100 metres (0.0 m/s)	Raymond Nelson (JAM)	10.57	Carlos Samuels (JAM)	10.76	Rudy Mith (MTQ)	10.79
200 metres (-3.7 m/s)	Donovan Powell (JAM)	21.42	Andrew Tynes (BAH)	21.55	Daniel England (JAM)	21.63
400 metres	Marcus Knowles (BAH)	47.30	Terrence McCrea (JAM)	47.34	Ronald Thorne (BAR)	47.45
800 metres	Steven Roberts (BAR)	1:51.26	Michael Williams (JAM)	1:51.31	Christopher Gallimore (JAM)	1:52.60
1500 metres	Michael Williams (JAM)	3:55.74	Quinton John (TRI)	3:56.69	Martin Reid (JAM)	3:58.88
5000 metres	Ronnie Holassie (TRI)	15:19.52	Martin Reid (JAM)	15:22.18	Junior Mitchell (TRI)	16:19.02
110 metres hurdles (2.8 m/s)	Delevante Brown (JAM)	14.36w	Sean Dupigny (BAR)	14.58w	Sébastien Solbiac (MTQ)	14.74w
400 metres hurdles	Winston Sinclair (JAM)	52.87	Terrence McCrea (JAM)	53.87	Lynden Hepburn (BAH)	54.58
High jump	Garreth Flowers (BAH)	2.13	Michael Davis (JAM)	2.13	David Collymore (LCA)	2.08
Pole vault	Mark Godfrey (JAM)	4.26	Junior Collins (JAM)	3.95	Ronnie Darville (BAH)	3.75
Long jump	Kareem Streete-Thompson (CAY)	7.94	Cyril Doornkamp (SUR)	7.36	Delevante Brown (JAM)	7.13
Triple jump	Daniel Sextius (GLP)	15.26	Kenny Boudine (GUF)	15.03	Jerome Douglas (JAM)	14.81
Shot put	Olivier Neisson (MTQ)	14.12	Pascal Nelson (GLP)	13.76	Rudy Finoly (MTQ)	13.51
Discus throw	Ryan Haylock (CAY)	39.32	Howard Brown (JAM)	38.60	Fidel Holder (BAR)	37.98
Javelin throw	Ryan Haylock (CAY)	61.64	Curland Peters (GRN)	55.50	Ronnie Darville (BAH)	53.26
4 × 100 metres relay	Jamaica; Norman Morse; Raymond Nelson; Leon Gordon; Michael Cowan	40.66	Bahamas	41.33	Barbados	41.40
4 × 400 metres relay	Barbados	3:09.22	Jamaica	3:10.05	Bahamas	3:14.17

=== Girls under 20 (Junior) ===
Event	Gold		Silver		Bronze	
100 metres (1.3 m/s)	Revoli Campbell (JAM)	11.54	Merlene Frazer (JAM)	11.75	Chandra Sturrup (BAH)	11.84
200 metres (-0.2 m/s)	Revoli Campbell (JAM)	23.34	Merlene Frazer (JAM)	23.89	Chandra Sturrup (BAH)	24.15
400 metres	Catherine Scott (JAM)	54.08	Inez Turner (JAM)	54.79	Carole Nelson (GUF)	57.11
800 metres	Inez Turner (JAM)	2:10.58	Janice Turner (JAM)	2:11.94	Shermaine Ross (GRN)	2:15.80
1500 metres	Janice Turner (JAM)	4:38.56	Mardrea Hyman (JAM)	4:48.26	Bernadine Thomas (TRI)	4:51.19
3000 metres	Mardrea Hyman (JAM)	10:08.75	Barbara Stewart (JAM)	10:21.53	Christine St. Cyr (GRN)	10:25.10
100 metres hurdles (1.8 m/s)	Gillian Russell (JAM)	13.8	Debbie-Ann Parris (JAM)	14.1	Betty Lise (MTQ)	14.4
High jump	Jocelyn Evans (JAM)	1.72	Diane Guthrie (JAM)	1.70	Daphne Saunders (BAH)	1.57
Long jump	Diane Guthrie (JAM)	6.31	Dedra Davis (BAH)	6.14	Debbie-Ann Parris (JAM)	5.98
Shot put	Valérie Laurin (MTQ)	12.01	Michelle Garvey (BAR)	11.93	Grace Hayles (JAM)	11.84
Discus throw	Tiffany Thompson (BAH)	36.98	Kadar Thomas (JAM)	35.96	Jessica Ashby (BAR)	34.60
Javelin throw	Lisa Casimir (DMA)	42.39	Geraldine George (TRI)	37.68	Natasha Joseph (TRI)	37.42
4 × 100 metres relay	Jamaica; Nikole Mitchell; Catherine Scott; Gillian Russell; Merlene Frazer	45.39	Bahamas	46.13	Guadeloupe	46.79
4 × 400 metres relay	Jamaica; Janice Turner; Winsome Cole; Catherine Scott; Inez Turner	3:38.28	Bahamas	3:52.12	Barbados	3:55.36

=== Boys under 17 (Youth) ===
Event	Gold		Silver		Bronze	
100 metres (1.1 m/s)	Leon Gordon (JAM)	10.87	Steve Garni (MTQ)	11.04	Michael Cowan (JAM)	11.10
200 metres (4.9 m/s)	Leon Gordon (JAM)	22.06w	Michael Cowan (JAM)	22.58w	Keita Cline (IVB)	22.72w
400 metres	Edward Clarke (JAM)	49.30	Gregory Blake (JAM)	49.34	Bruno Latcha (GLP)	50.26
800 metres	Escoffrey Thomas (JAM)	1:56.39	Horace Steele (JAM)	1:59.39	Brian Brewster (BAR)	2:00.53
1500 metres	Escoffrey Thomas (JAM)	4:09.94	Horace Steele (JAM)	4:12.38	Brian Brewster (BAR)	4:17.61
High jump	Dennis Fearon (JAM)	2.03	Victor Houston (BAR)	2.00	Neil Gardner (JAM)	1.98
Long jump	Everald Facey (JAM)	7.09	Victor Houston (BAR)	7.04	Leon Gordon (JAM)	6.98
Triple jump	Victor Houston (BAR)	14.73	Patrice Aubatin (GLP)	14.72	Jason Richards (BAH)	14.13
Shot put	Dave Taylor (BAR)	14.85	Christopher Wilson (JAM)	14.22	Hugh Rolle (BAH)	13.72
Discus throw	Kirk Nesbeth (JAM)	43.28	Dave Taylor (BAR)	43.00	Christopher Wilson (JAM)	40.64
Javelin throw	Victor Houston (BAR)	52.50	Curtis Applewhite (TRI)	50.80	Hugh Rolle (BAH)	47.42

=== Girls under 17 (Youth) ===
Event	Gold		Silver		Bronze	
100 metres (1.9 m/s)	Nikole Mitchell (JAM)	11.77	Carmetta McKay (BAH)	12.16	Savatheda Fynes (BAH)	12.20
200 metres (3.4 m/s)	Nikole Mitchell (JAM)	24.30w	Maxine Dawkins (JAM)	24.33w	Carmetta McKay (BAH)	24.89w
400 metres	Wynsome Cole (JAM)	54.92	Vernetta Rolle (BAH)	55.60	Ellen Grant (JAM)	56.91
800 metres	Claudine Williams (JAM)	2:09.83	Charmaine Howell (JAM)	2:12.64	Vernetta Rolle (BAH)	2:12.90
1500 metres	Claudine Williams (JAM)	4:45.40	Charmaine Howell (JAM)	4:46.86	Christine St. Cyr (GRN)	4:53.14
High jump	Najuma Fletcher (GUY)	1.72	Icolyn Kelly (JAM)	1.70	Jill Eneas (BAH)	1.67
Long jump	Suzette Lee (JAM)	5.80	Najuma Fletcher (GUY)	5.42	Trecia Smith (JAM)	5.25
Shot put	Anne-Marie Riley (BAH)	10.99	Marcia Taylor (BAH)	10.94	Dominique Perroni (MTQ)	10.52
Discus throw	Marcia Taylor (BAH)	37.42	Marsha Minns (BAH)	32.78	Dominique Perroni (MTQ)	30.24
Javelin throw	Marsha Mark (TRI)	40.44	Kathy Ann Lewis (GRN)	32.90	Marsha Minns (BAH)	31.98

== Medal table (unofficial) ==
* Host nation (Jamaica)

Rank	Nation	Gold	Silver	Bronze	Total
1	Jamaica (JAM)*	32	27	13	72
2	Bahamas (BAH)	5	9	15	29
3	Barbados (BAR)	5	5	7	17
4	Cayman Islands (CAY)	3	0	0	3
5	Trinidad and Tobago (TTO)	2	3	3	8
6	Martinique (MTQ)	2	1	6	9
7	Guadeloupe (GLP)	1	2	2	5
8	Guyana (GUY)	1	1	0	2
9	Dominica (DMA)	1	0	0	1
10	Grenada (GRN)	0	2	3	5
11	French Guiana (GUF)	0	1	1	2
12	Suriname (SUR)	0	1	0	1
13	British Virgin Islands (IVB)	0	0	1	1
13	Saint Lucia (LCA)	0	0	1	1
Totals (14 entries)		52	52	52	156
