= 1991 Pan American Junior Athletics Championships =

VI Pan American Junior Athletics Championships
- Dates: July 18–20
- Host city: Kingston, Jamaica
- Level: Junior
- Events: 41
- Participation: about 347 athletes from 26 nations

The 6th Pan American Junior Athletics Championships were held in Kingston, Jamaica, on July 18–20, 1991.

== Participation (unofficial) ==
Detailed result lists can be found on the "World Junior Athletics History" website. An unofficial count yields the number of about 347 athletes from about 26 countries: Argentina (5), Bahamas (1), Barbados (4), Bermuda (3), Brazil (10), British Virgin Islands (2), Canada (65), Chile (6), Cuba (41), Dominica (1), Ecuador (8), Grenada (4), Guatemala (7), Guyana (1), Jamaica (49), Mexico (46), Netherlands Antilles (2), Panama (9), Paraguay (1), Peru (4), Puerto Rico (5), Saint Vincent and the Grenadines (2), Trinidad and Tobago (5), Turks and Caicos Islands (5), United States (47), Venezuela (14).

== Medal summary ==
Medal winners are published. Complete results can be found on the "World Junior Athletics History" website.

=== Men ===
| Event | Gold | | Silver | | Bronze | |
|---|---|---|---|---|---|---|
| 100 metres | Keith Green (USA) | 10.29w | Peter Ogilvie (CAN) | 10.43w | Edgar Chourio (VEN) | 10.44w |
| 200 metres | Bryan Bronson (USA) | 20.62 | Peter Ogilvie (CAN) | 20.75 | Rudolph Mighty (JAM) | 20.99 |
| 400 metres | Deon Minor (USA) | 46.24 | Corey Williams (USA) | 46.31 | Hayden Stephen (TRI) | 46.91 |
| 800 metres | José Parrilla (USA) | 1:49.14 | Benvenuto Silva (BRA) | 1:49.68 | Graham Hood (CAN) | 1:49.79 |
| 1500 metres | Graham Hood (CAN) | 3:52.48 | Quinton John (TRI) | 3:52.97 | Darrell Hughes (USA) | 3:54.47 |
| 5000 metres | Joseph Kibur (CAN) | 14:47.19 | Eduardo do Nascimento (BRA) | 14:49.18 | Pablo Olmedo (MEX) | 14:51.40 |
| 10,000 metres | Janik Lambert (CAN) | 30:29.25 | Jim Finlayson (CAN) | 30:34.65 | Leonel Medina (VEN) | 31:21.26 |
| 3000 metres steeplechase | Emerson Vettori (BRA) | 9:08.60 | Néstor Nieves (VEN) | 9:10.08 | Jeff Schiebler (CAN) | 9:21.78 |
| 110 metres hurdles | Chris Phillips (USA) | 13.84 | Sean Dupigny (BAR) | 14.07 | Federico Ifill (VEN) | 14.20 |
| 400 metres hurdles | John Rothell (USA) | 51.31 | Mitchell Francis (JAM) | 51.48 | Alejandro Argudín (CUB) | 52.01 |
| 4 × 100 metres relay | United States; Wendell Gaskin; Keith Green; Hosia Abdallah; Bryan Bronson | 39.47 | Jamaica; Patrick Jarrett; Rudolph Mighty; Leon Gordon; Wayne Fenton | 40.45 | Cuba; Iván García; Alberto Manzano; Yoelbi Quesada; Iván Pedroso | 41.58 |
| 4 × 400 metres relay | United States; Bryan Bronson; Tony Parilla; Corey Williams; Deon Minor | 3:03.53 | Cuba; Norberto Téllez; Omar González; Robelis Darroman; Alejandro Argudín | 3:09.19 | Jamaica; Christopher Gallimore; Rudolph Mighty; Mitchell Francis; Greg Haughton | 3:09.58 |
| 10,000 metres track walk | Alberto Cruz (MEX) | 42:38.51 | Jefferson Pérez (ECU) | 44:06.11 | Alfonso Guerrero (MEX) | 44:42.72 |
| High jump | Eric Taylor-Perry (USA) | 2.19 | Dennis Fearon (JAM) | 2.16 | Ignacio Hernández (CUB) | 2.13 |
| Pole vault | Alberto Manzano (CUB) | 5.00 | David Cox (USA) | 4.70 | Marlon Borges (BRA) | 4.70 |
| Long jump | Iván Pedroso (CUB) | 8.08 | Victor Houston (BAR) | 7.40 | Carlos Mingoes (JAM) | 7.38 |
| Triple jump | Yoelbi Quesada (CUB) | 16.81 | Daniel Osorio (CUB) | 16.46 | Jairo Venâncio (BRA) | 16.24 |
| Shot put | John Godina (USA) | 17.75 | Jeff Teach (USA) | 16.31 | Jorge García (CUB) | 16.05 |
| Discus throw | John Godina (USA) | 53.98 | Yojer Medina (VEN) | 49.54 | Julio Piñero (ARG) | 47.44 |
| Hammer throw | Alberto Sánchez (CUB) | 63.52 | Yosvany Suárez (CUB) | 61.06 | Kevin McMahon (USA) | 59.48 |
| Javelin throw | Leobardo Vall (MEX) | 69.12 | Diosleidi Disgusnay (CUB) | 66.00 | Isbel Luaces (CUB) | 65.65 |
| Decathlon | Mario Sategna (USA) | 7105 | David Cook (CAN) | 6805 | Stephen Bulpitt (CAN) | 6416 |

=== Women ===
| Event | Gold | | Silver | | Bronze | |
|---|---|---|---|---|---|---|
| 100 metres | Sabrina Kelly (USA) | 11.52 | Merlene Frazer (JAM) | 11.59 | Savatheda Fynes (BAH) | 11.75 |
| 200 metres | Merlene Frazer (JAM) | 23.53 | Michelle Christie (JAM) | 24.11 | Zilla Higgs (USA) | 24.17 |
| 400 metres | Cheryl Allen (CAN) | 53.39 | Catherine Scott (JAM) | 53.47 | Shanelle Porter (USA) | 53.66 |
| 800 metres | Inez Turner (JAM) | 2:04.57 | Nicole Teter (USA) | 2:06.34 | Brigitte Nehma (CAN) | 2:06.65 |
| 1500 metres | Lori Durward (CAN) | 4:24.76 | Rebecca Spies (USA) | 4:25.16 | Janice Turner (JAM) | 4:32.59 |
| 3000 metres | Michelle Lafleur (USA) | 9:34.56 | María Elena Jasso (MEX) | 9:41.90 | Angela Schwan (CAN) | 9:42.82 |
| 10,000 metres | Pamela Hanson (USA) | 35:36.57 | Jean Harvey (USA) | 36:04.33 | Carmen Naranjo (ECU) | 36:30.93 |
| 100 metres hurdles | Oraidis Ramírez (CUB) | 13.67 | Gillian Russell (JAM) | 13.73 | Kwani Stewart (USA) | 13.74 |
| 400 metres hurdles | Erica Peterson (CAN) | 57.87 | Wynsome Cole (JAM) | 58.18 | Rosa Rodríguez (CUB) | 59.03 |
| 4 × 100 metres relay | Jamaica; Michelle Christie; Merlene Frazer; Maxine Dawkins; Nikole Mitchell | 44.57 | United States; Zilla Higgs; Danielle Marshall; Kwani Stewart; Sabrina Kelly | 45.31 | Cuba; Dainelky Pérez; Midiala Vaillant; Lien Gay; Reyna Carretero | 46.14 |
| 4 × 400 metres relay | Jamaica; Jackie Gayle; Winsome Cole; Inez Turner; Catherine Scott | 3:33.13 | United States; Janeen Jones; Tanya Dooley; Drexel Long; Shanelle Porter | 3:34.43 | Cuba; Agneris Grinon; Yojani Casanova; Roso Rodríguez; Odalmis Limonta | 3:36.48 |
| 5000 metres track walk | Rosario Sánchez (MEX) | 24:03.47 | Yoslaine Puñales (CUB) | 24:14.58 | Mylene Dupere (CAN) | 24:32.59 |
| High jump | Ioamnet Quintero (CUB) | 1.90 | Tanya Hughes (USA) | 1.87 | Ana Quiñónez (GUA) | 1.79 |
| Long jump | Lien Rodríguez (CUB) | 6.19 | Miloidis Durives (CUB) | 6.17 | Jacqueline Brown (USA) | 6.10 |
| Triple jump | Magalys Villamil (CUB) | 12.61 | Tyra Moore (USA) | 12.37 | Suzette Lee (JAM) | 12.01 |
| Shot put | Nolvis Puentes (CUB) | 16.52 | Dawn Dumble (USA) | 16.26 | Elisângela Adriano (BRA) | 15.71 |
| Discus throw | Dawn Dumble (USA) | 52.40 | Elisângela Adriano (BRA) | 51.40 | Ania Hurtado (CUB) | 47.38 |
| Javelin throw | Yolanda Pérez (CUB) | 52.86 | Valerie Tulloch (CAN) | 50.86 | María Caridad Álvarez (CUB) | 49.98 |
| Heptathlon | Euzinete dos Reis (BRA) | 5424 | Miladys Portuondo (CUB) | 5178 | Yolaida Pompa (CUB) | 5129 |

== Medal table (unofficial) ==
* Host nation (Jamaica)

| Rank | Nation | Gold | Silver | Bronze | Total |
|---|---|---|---|---|---|
| 1 | United States | 16 | 11 | 6 | 33 |
| 2 | Cuba | 10 | 7 | 11 | 28 |
| 3 | Canada | 6 | 5 | 6 | 17 |
| 4 | Jamaica* | 4 | 8 | 5 | 17 |
| 5 | Mexico | 3 | 1 | 2 | 6 |
| 6 | Brazil | 2 | 3 | 3 | 8 |
| 7 | Venezuela | 0 | 2 | 3 | 5 |
| 8 | Barbados | 0 | 2 | 0 | 2 |
| 9 | Ecuador | 0 | 1 | 1 | 2 |
| 9 | Trinidad and Tobago | 0 | 1 | 1 | 2 |
| 11 | Argentina | 0 | 0 | 1 | 1 |
| 11 | Bahamas | 0 | 0 | 1 | 1 |
| 11 | Guatemala | 0 | 0 | 1 | 1 |
| Totals (13 entries) | | 41 | 41 | 41 | 123 |
