= 1990 Central American and Caribbean Junior Championships in Athletics =

IX Central American and Caribbean Junior Championships
- Dates: 6–8 July
- Host city: Havana, Cuba
- Level: Junior and Youth
- Events: 77 (40 junior, 37 youth)
- Participation: about 406 (219 junior, 187 youth) athletes from 12 nations

The 9th Central American and Caribbean Junior Championships were held in Havana, Cuba, between 6–8 July 1990.

== Medal summary ==
Medal winners are published by category: Junior A, Male, Junior A, Female, and Junior B. Complete results can be found on the World Junior Athletics History website.

There are some differences between the results in the different sources. The Rules for the Central American and Caribbean Track and Field Championships regulate : "Each country can enter a maximum of two (2) competitors per individual event with the exception of the 1/2 marathon in which three competitors per country may be allowed." Therefore, it is assumed that additional athletes from host country Cuba started out of competition, especially in the field events, and were not eligible for gaining championships medals.

=== Male Junior A (under 20) ===
Event	Gold		Silver		Bronze	
100 metres (-0.1 m/s)	Donovan Powell (JAM)	10.48	Edgar Chourio (VEN)	10.49	Joel Lamela (CUB)	10.61
200 metres (-0.9 m/s)	Edgar Chourio (VEN)	21.12	Andrew Tynes (BAH)	21.27	Wayde Payne (BAR)	21.46
400 metres	Ronald Thorne (BAR)	46.97	Norberto Téllez (CUB)	47.22	Terry Harewood (BAR)	47.87
800 metres	Norberto Téllez (CUB)	1:50.08	Steven Roberts (BAR)	1:50.36	Michael Williams (JAM)	1:51.19
1500 metres	Terrance Armstrong (BER)	3:54.08	Omar Díaz (CUB)	3:54.19	Héctor Arias (MEX)	3:55.01
5000 metres	Marcos Orchet (CUB)	15:17.14	Luis Collazo (PUR)	15:17.50	Daniel Álvarez (CUB)	15:22.02
10,000 metres	Elisaldo León (CUB)	30:45.12	Héctor Martínez (CUB)	31:47.65	Juan Cruz (MEX)	33:38.90
Half Marathon	Elisaldo León (CUB)	1:08:28	Héctor Martínez (CUB)	1:10:07	Juan Cruz (MEX)	1:11:02
3000 metres steeplechase	Héctor Arias (MEX)	9:07.90	Francisco Veranes (CUB)	9:15.19	Salvador Miranda (MEX)	9:15.67
110 metres hurdles (0.3 m/s)	Alexis Sánchez (CUB)	14.03	José Pérez (CUB)	14.18	Eliecer Pulgar (VEN)	14.81
400 metres hurdles	Pedro Piñera (CUB)	51.55	Norge Bell (CUB)	52.36	Lynden Hepburn (BAH)	54.61
High jump	Garreth Flowers (BAH)	2.13	Osvaldo Fernández (CUB)	2.06	Ignacio Hernández (CUB)	2.06
Pole vault	Alberto Manzano (CUB)	5.45	Edgar León (MEX)	4.20	Mark Godfrey (JAM)	4.10
Long jump	Kareem Streete-Thompson (CAY)	7.97 (0.3 m/s)	Iván Pedroso (CUB)	7.74 (0.3 m/s)	Frederick Lottimore (BER)	7.64 (0.1 m/s)
Triple jump^{1)}	Yoelbi Quesada (CUB)	16.68 (1.2 m/s)	David Walter (CUB)	16.29 (-0.5 m/s)	Emmitt Higgins (BAH)	15.19 (-0.5 m/s)
Shot put	Orlando Torres (CUB)	15.93	Yojer Medina (VEN)	15.07	Yosvany Obregón (CUB)	14.68
Discus throw	Frank Bicet (CUB)	54.42	Lázaro Vega (CUB)	49.50	Yojer Medina (VEN)	46.94
Hammer throw^{2)}	Yosvany Suárez (CUB)	57.54	Domingo Sandoval (CUB)	56.46	Julián Núñez (MEX)	34.80
Javelin throw	Emeterio González (CUB)	62.42	Leonardo Vaal (MEX)	61.94	Ismael Márquez (CUB)	59.84
Decathlon	Juan Ventosa (CUB)	6322	Luis Pastor (MEX)	5591	Ronnie Darville (BAH)	5555
10,000 metres track walk	Alberto Cruz (MEX)	44:11.00	Ignacio Zamudio (MEX)	44:52.56	Leonardo Sariol (CUB)	46:10.50
4 × 100 metres relay	Cuba; Joel Lamela; Leonardo Prevot; Ernesto González; Iván García	40.62	Jamaica; Raymond Nelson; Daniel England; Donovan Powell; Norman Morse	40.66	Bahamas; Andrew Tynes; Marcus Knowles; Troy McIntosh; Randy Neely	41.74
4 × 400 metres relay	Barbados; Wayde Payne; Terry Harewood; Ronald Thorne; Roger Jordan	3:09.00	Cuba; Norberto Téllez; Norge Bell; L. Mustelier; C. Isnaga	3:09.48	Jamaica; Christopher Gallimore; Terrence McCrea; Floyd Howell; Daniel England	3:09.95

Remarks:

^{1)} Elsewhere, Daniel Osorio of Cuba is listed 3rd with 15.96m.

^{2)} Elsewhere, Alberto Sánchez of Cuba is listed 3rd with 56.40m.

=== Female Junior A (under 20) ===
Event	Gold		Silver		Bronze	
100 metres (-0.4 m/s)	Revoli Campbell (JAM)	11.64	Gillian Russell (JAM)	11.83	Chandra Sturrup (BAH)	11.89
200 metres (-0.5 m/s)	Revoli Campbell (JAM)	23.67	Julia Duporty (CUB)	23.80	Idalmis Bonne (CUB)	24.18
400 metres	Nancy McLeón (CUB)	53.31	Inez Turner (JAM)	53.91	Yojani Casanova (CUB)	54.67
800 metres	Inez Turner (JAM)	2:09.16	Irma Betancourt (MEX)	2:09.16	Janice Turner (JAM)	2:13.56
1500 metres	Irma Betancourt (MEX)	4:26.48	Verónica Rivera (MEX)	4:28.38	Janice Turner (JAM)	4:31.61
3000 metres	Verónica Rivera (MEX)	9:50.41	Paola Cabrera (MEX)	9:53.55	Mayelín Sotolongo (CUB)	10:02.98
100 metres hurdles (-0.2 m/s)	Oraidis Ramírez (CUB)	13.79	Gillian Russell (JAM)	13.86	Clara Torres (CUB)	15.04
400 metres hurdles	Bárbara Fernández (CUB)	59.64	Milagros Echevarría (CUB)	60.60	Josefa Castro (VEN)	63.06
High jump^{3)}	Ioamnet Quintero (CUB)	1.85	Diane Guthrie (JAM)	1.70	Yamilé Aldama (CUB)	1.70
Long jump	Diane Guthrie (JAM)	6.09 (-0.7 m/s)	Yaminoraidez Martínez (CUB)	6.02 (-0.3 m/s)	Dedra Davis (BAH)	5.84 (-0.5 m/s)
Shot put^{4)}	Norbi Balantén (CUB)	15.46	Michelle Garvey (BAR)	13.00	Maricela Bristel (CUB)	12.41
Discus throw^{5)}	Maricela Bristel (CUB)	52.20	Marlén Sánchez (CUB)	40.74	Dulce María Flores (MEX)	38.84
Javelin throw^{6)}	Odelmys Palma (CUB)	56.66	Sonia Bisset (CUB)	55.20	Patrice Scotland (BER)	42.40
Heptathlon^{7)}	Magalys García (CUB)	5517	Yolaida Pompa (CUB)	5505	Diane Guthrie (JAM)	4866
5000 metres track walk	Yoslaine Puñales (CUB)	25:44.41	Maribel Calderón (CUB)	26:21.76		
4 × 100 metres relay	Jamaica; Gillian Russell; Marjorie Bailey; Revolie Campbell; Jackie Gayle	45.62	Cuba; Tellami Martínez; Oraidis Ramírez; Idalmis Bonne; Julia Duporty	45.64	Bahamas; Chandra Sturrup; Michelle Johnson; Dedra Davis; Valeska Browne	47.44
4 × 400 metres relay	Cuba; Odalmis Limonta; Bárbara Fernández; Nancy McLeón; Yojani Casanova	3:37.12	Jamaica; Marjorie Bailey; Inez Turner; Revoli Campbell; Jackie Gayle	3:38.07	Bahamas; Chandra Sturrup; Michelle Johnson; Valeska Browne; Lovina Knowles	3:54.54

Remarks:

^{3)} Elsewhere, Isabel Aldecoa of Cuba is listed 2nd with 1.70m and Diane Guthrie of Jamaica is listed 3rd.

^{4)} Elsewhere, Ania Hurtado of Cuba is listed 3rd with 12.95m.

^{5)} Elsewhere, Ania Hurtado of Cuba is listed 2nd with 47.14m and Taybis Gómez of Cuba is listed 3rd with 44.50m.

^{6)} Elsewhere, Yaquelín García of Cuba is listed 3rd with 48.60m.

^{7)} Elsewhere, Diosgracia Verdiof Cuba is listed 3rd with 4985pts.

=== Male Junior B (under 17) ===
Event	Gold		Silver		Bronze	
100 metres (-0.2 m/s)	Leon Gordon (JAM)	10.90	Alfredo García (CUB)	11.04	Wayne Fenton (JAM)	11.06
200 metres (0.3 m/s)	Leon Gordon (JAM)	21.99	Alfredo García (CUB)	22.00	Wayne Fenton (JAM)	22.75
400 metres	Edward Clarke (JAM)	49.00	Gregory Blake (JAM)	49.64	Delon Felix (GRN)	50.46
800 metres	Escoffrey Thomas (JAM)	1:55.55	Mario Rivera (PUR)	1:55.87	Julio Fuentes (CUB)	1:57.04
1500 metres	Néstor Nieves (VEN)	3:59.32	Escoffrey Thomas (JAM)	3:59.99	Julio Fuentes (CUB)	4:04.29
3000 metres	Néstor Nieves (VEN)	9:01.48	Ismael Iglesias (CUB)	9:02.05	Yoslay Reyes (CUB)	9:07.05
2000 metres steeplechase	Néstor Nieves (VEN)	5:57.04	Ismael Iglesias (CUB)	6:01.72	Jorge Palma (CUB)	6:24.30
110 metres hurdles (0.1 m/s)	Félix Marcos (CUB)	14.69	Arion Figueras (CUB)	14.78	Everard Facey (JAM)	15.36
400 metres hurdles	Alejandro Argudín (CUB)	53.54	Félix Marcos (CUB)	53.83	Edward Clarke (JAM)	54.96
High jump	Victor Houston (BAR)	2.05	Andrés Leal (CUB)	2.02	Wilfredo Carias (VEN)	1.99
Pole vault	Ricardo Diez (VEN)	3.90	Luis Hidalgo (VEN)	3.90	Carlos Carrillo (CUB)	3.80
Long jump	Juan Garzón (CUB)	7.15 (0.4 m/s)	Héctor Fuentes (CUB)	7.08 (0.3 m/s)	Everard Facey (JAM)	6.98 (1.2 m/s)
Triple jump	Rafael Blanco (CUB)	15.01 (0.0 m/s)	Victor Houston (BAR)	14.90 (0.0 m/s)	César Ríos (CUB)	14.65 (0.0 m/s)
Shot put	Yohan González (CUB)	16.80	Dave Taylor (BAR)	16.66	Jorge López (VEN)	16.09
Discus throw	Manuel Pequeño (CUB)	48.88	Michel Hemmings (CUB)	48.88	Jorge López (VEN)	45.94
Hammer throw	Lester St. Rose (CUB)	64.84	Ronald London (CUB)	56.76	Rodolfo García (VEN)	49.70
Javelin throw	Isbel Luaces (CUB)	61.40	Norberto Perigo (CUB)	54.50	Victor Houston (BAR)	51.04
Heptathlon	Raúl Duany (CUB)	4781	Carlos Carrillo (CUB)	4508	Luis Rafael Mariño (VEN)	3864
5000 metres track walk	José Camacho (MEX)	23:24.36	Luis Gonga (CUB)	24:00.73	Carlos Frómeta (CUB)	25:20.03
4 × 100 metres relay	Jamaica; Leon Gordon; Edward Clarke; Everard Facey; Wayne Fenton	42.39	Venezuela; J. Suarez; Alexander Cotty; Slym Guzmán; Juan Lessmann	43.30	Puerto Rico; Miguel Ortega; José Seary; Abner Hernández; Erick Torres	43.48
4 × 400 metres relay	Jamaica; Gregory Blake; Edward Clarke; O'Neil Duncan; Leon Gordon	3:18.29	Puerto Rico; Miguel Ortega; José Seary; Abner Hernández; Erick Torres	3:24.27	Cuba; Alejandro Argudín; Pavel Benet; Félix Marcos; Lester St. Rose	3:24.69

=== Female Junior B (under 17) ===
Event	Gold		Silver		Bronze	
100 metres (0.2 m/s)	Nikole Mitchell (JAM)	11.88	Savatheda Fynes (BAH)	12.13	Idalia Hechevarría (CUB)	12.15
200 metres (0.2 m/s)	Carmetta McKay (BAH)	24.28	Savatheda Fynes (BAH)	24.68	Maxine Dawkins (JAM)	24.71
400 metres	Claudine Williams (JAM)	54.52	Vernetta Rolle (BAH)	55.53	Wynsome Cole (JAM)	55.57
800 metres	Claudine Williams (JAM)	2:09.01	Dayami Sariol (CUB)	2:09.72	Vernetta Rolle (BAH)	2:11.49
1200 metres	Dayami Sariol (CUB)	3:34.29	Yaquelín Hernández (CUB)	3:34.31	Charmaine Howell (JAM)	3:37.69
100 metres hurdles (-0.3 m/s)	Damaris Anderson (CUB)	14.67	Yahumara Neyra (CUB)	14.69	Lacena Golding (JAM)	15.07
300 metres hurdles	Wynsome Cole (JAM)	42.74	Yahumara Neyra (CUB)	42.85	Katiuska Pérez (CUB)	44.69
High jump	Orisis Pedroso (CUB)	1.70	Jill Eneas (BAH)	1.65	Elba Llanes (CUB)	1.65
Long jump	Orisis Pedroso (CUB)	5.98 (0.4 m/s)	Lissette Cuza (CUB)	5.72 (1.1 m/s)	Lacena Golding (JAM)	5.44 (0.1 m/s)
Shot put	Alina Pupo (CUB)	15.46	Yumileidi Cumbá (CUB)	14.54	Angélica Roux (MEX)	13.58
Discus throw	Yumileidi Cumbá (CUB)	38.96	Sonia O'Farrill (CUB)	37.78	Marcia Taylor (BAH)	37.10
Javelin throw	María de la Caridad Álvarez (CUB)	50.10	Odalys Palma (CUB)	45.64	Adriana Salas (MEX)	35.44
Pentathlon	Orisis Pedroso (CUB)	3920	Regla Cárdeñas (CUB)	3669	Debbie Ferguson (BAH)	3015
5000 metres track walk	Izlaiza Padilla (CUB)	29:17.14	Arianna Betancourt (CUB)	29:17.19		
4 × 100 metres relay	Jamaica; Astia Walker; Winsome Cole; Nikole Mitchell; Suzette Lee	46.66	Cuba; Idalia Hechavarría; Dainelky Pérez; Yahumara Neyra; Katiuska Pérez	46.85	Bahamas; Savatheda Fynes; Carmetta Mackey; Vernetta Rolle; Debbie Ferguson	47.66
4 × 400 metres relay	Bahamas; Savatheda Fynes; Vernetta Rolle; Arniece McPhee; Debbie Ferguson	3:47.22	Cuba; Yolaine Danger; Reyna Carretero; Yaquelín Hernández; Dayami Sariol	3:49.24	Jamaica; Winsome Cole; Charmaine Howell; Faith Dawkins; Claudine Williams	3:54.57

== Medal table (unofficial) ==
* Host nation (Cuba)

Rank	Nation	Gold	Silver	Bronze	Total
1	Cuba*	42	46	23	111
2	Jamaica	17	8	17	42
3	Mexico	5	7	8	20
4	Venezuela	5	4	8	17
5	Bahamas	3	5	12	20
6	Barbados	3	4	3	10
7	Bermuda	1	0	2	3
8	Cayman Islands	1	0	0	1
9	Puerto Rico	0	3	1	4
10	Grenada	0	0	1	1
Totals (10 entries)		77	77	75	229

== Participation (unofficial) ==
Detailed result lists can be found on the World Junior Athletics History website. An unofficial count yields a number of about 406 athletes (219 junior (under-20) and 187 youth (under-17)) from about 12 countries:

- Bahamas (36)
- Barbados (11)
- Bermuda (25)
- Cayman Islands (2)
- Cuba (115)
- Grenada (3)
- Jamaica (39)
- (Mexico) México (68)
- Netherlands Antilles (5)
- Puerto Rico (59)
- U.S. Virgin Islands (2)
- Venezuela (41)
