= 1989 CARIFTA Games =

XVIII CARIFTA Games
- Dates: March 25–27
- Host city: Bridgetown, Barbados
- Level: Junior and Youth
- Events: 50
- Participation: at least 105 athletes from at least 17 nations

The 18th CARIFTA Games was held in Bridgetown, Barbados on March 25–27, 1989.

== Participation (unofficial) ==
For the 1989 CARIFTA Games only the medalists can be found on the "World Junior Athletics History" website. An unofficial count yields the number of about 105 medalists (59 junior (under-20) and 46 youth (under-17)) from about 17 countries: Antigua and Barbuda (1), Bahamas (20), Barbados (6), Bermuda (2), British Virgin Islands (1), Cayman Islands (3), Dominica (2), Grenada (5), Guadeloupe (2), Guyana (5), Jamaica (35), Martinique (7), Netherlands Antilles (2), Saint Kitts and Nevis (2), Saint Lucia (2), Saint Vincent and the Grenadines (2), Trinidad and Tobago (8).

== Austin Sealy Award ==
The Austin Sealy Trophy for the most outstanding athlete of the games was awarded to Kareem Streete-Thompson from the Cayman Islands. He won a gold medal in long jump with a remarkable jump of 7.83m, which is still the championships record, a silver medal in 100m, and a bronze medal in 200 metres in the youth (U-17) category.

== Medal summary ==
Medal winners are published by category: Boys under 20 (Junior), Girls under 20 (Junior), Boys under 17 (Youth), and Girls under 17 (Youth). The medalists can also be found on the "World Junior Athletics History" website.

=== Boys under 20 (Junior) ===
Event	Gold		Silver		Bronze	
100 metres	Windell Dobson (JAM)	10.53	Donovan Powell (JAM)	10.64	Rudy Mith (MTQ)	10.87
200 metres	Trevor Gilbert (JAM)	21.5	Donovan Powell (JAM)	21.8	Kevin Lawson (TRI)	21.9
400 metres	Barrington Campbell (JAM)	47.48	Terry Harewood (BAR)	47.90	Clarence Richards (JAM)	48.18
800 metres	Michael Williams (JAM)	1:54.1	Desmond Dorsett (BAH)	1:54.5	Steven Roberts (BAR)	1:54.6
1500 metres	Quinton John (TRI)	3:55.99	Michael Williams (JAM)	3:58.22	Desmond Dorsett (BAH)	4:01.39
5000 metres	Ronnie Holassie (TRI)	15:26.81	Albert Donawa (BER)	15:42.88	Codrington McPherson (GUY)	15:46.96
400 metres hurdles	Crodel Smith (JAM)	53.5	Clarence Richards (JAM)	54.5	Robert Rahming (BAH)	56.0
High jump	Rawle Griffith (GUY)	2.15	Garreth Flowers (BAH)	2.05	Raymond Solomon (IVB)	2.00
Pole vault	Mark Godfrey (JAM)	3.90	Ronnie Darville (BAH)	3.80	Randy Perpall (BAH)	3.70
Long jump	Windell Dobson (JAM)	7.42	Jean-Luc Poussin (MTQ)	7.36	Jérôme Romain (DMA)	7.27
Triple jump	Andrew Belnavis (JAM)	15.46	Jérôme Romain (DMA)	15.06	Gary Samuels (JAM)	13.81
Shot put	Hervé Hauterville (MTQ)	14.37	Dave Grant (JAM)	14.00	Christian Médina (GLP)	13.90
Discus throw	Rufus Kemp (BAH)	40.52	Hervé Hauterville (MTQ)	40.42	Ryan Haylock (CAY)	37.68
Javelin throw	Ricky Francis (TRI)	62.46	Kevin Smith (BAH)	62.30	Clifford Worme (GRN)	55.84
4 × 100 metres relay	Jamaica	40.4	Trinidad and Tobago	41.6	Martinique	41.8
4 × 400 metres relay	Jamaica	3:12.93	Barbados	3:14.07	Bahamas	3:21.90

=== Girls under 20 (Junior) ===
Event	Gold		Silver		Bronze	
100 metres	Heather Samuel (ATG)	11.71	Andria Lloyd (JAM)	11.73	Revoli Campbell (JAM)	11.79
200 metres	Revoli Campbell (JAM)	23.6	Chandra Sturrup (BAH)	24.1	Andria Lloyd (JAM)	24.4
400 metres	Inez Turner (JAM)	52.7	Juliet Campbell (JAM)	54.4	Shermaine Ross (GRN)	56.0
800 metres	Inez Turner (JAM)	2:07.6	Karen Bennett (JAM)	2:13.4	Serene Carey (SKN)	2:15.9
1500 metres	Karen Bennett (JAM)	4:43.73	Suzie Bent (JAM)	4:47.09	Rhonda Wilson (GUY)	4:53.12
3000 metres	Suzie Bent (JAM)	10:27.6	Christine St. Cyr (GRN)	10:35.1	Mardrea Hyman (JAM)	10:37.6
High jump	Diane Guthrie (JAM)	1.70	Fadelma Layne (BAR)	1.70	Daphne Saunders (BAH)	1.65
Long jump	Daphne Saunders (BAH)	6.39	Diane Guthrie (JAM)	6.15	Yvette Haynes (VIN)	5.87
Shot put	Denise Taylor (BAH)	13.29	Antoinette Scipio (TRI)	12.21	Adela Paul (LCA)	11.69
Discus throw	Denise Taylor (BAH)	46.96	Rose-Hélène Vétral (MTQ)	38.26	Kadar Thomas (JAM)	37.82
Javelin throw	Chantell Miller (BAH)	44.90	Rhonda Henry (GRN)	40.92	Antoinette Scipio (TRI)	40.64
4 × 100 metres relay	Jamaica	45.3	Bahamas	46.6	Trinidad and Tobago	47.7
4 × 400 metres relay	Jamaica	3:40.65	Bahamas	3:51.28	Trinidad and Tobago	4:00.73

=== Boys under 17 (Youth) ===
Event	Gold		Silver		Bronze	
100 metres	Adrian Bobb (TRI)	10.81	Kareem Streete-Thompson (CAY)	10.88	Leon Gordon (JAM)	10.93
200 metres	Carlos Samuels (JAM)	21.7	Mark Noreiga (TRI)	21.7	Kareem Streete-Thompson (CAY)	21.9
400 metres	Adrian Treston (JAM)	48.86	Mark Noreiga (TRI)	49.21	Karl McPherson (JAM)	49.44
800 metres	Dwayne Henry (JAM)	1:55.9	David Nancy (MTQ)	1:57.0	Escoffrey Thomas (JAM)	1:57.7
1500 metres	David Nancy (MTQ)	4:05.85	Euron Scoop (AHO)	4:07.74	Escoffrey Thomas (JAM)	4:08.62
High jump	Victor Houston (BAR)	2.00	Nicholas Tucker (BAH)	1.95	Neil Gardner (JAM)	1.90
Long jump	Kareem Streete-Thompson (CAY)	7.83	Gillian Vigier (LCA)	6.89	Leon Gordon (JAM)	6.86
Triple jump	David Stuart (BAH)	14.35	Austin Dickenson (SKN)	13.99	Felix Bowe (BAH)	13.90
Shot put	Ramses Snijder (AHO)	13.89	Olu Tinubu (BAH)	13.78	Eddy Figuro (GLP)	13.77
Discus throw	Oral Grant (JAM)	46.54	Dave Taylor (BAR)	37.96	Olu Tinubu (BAH)	37.02
Javelin throw	Ramses Snijder (AHO)	57.82	Raphael Cumberbatch (BAR)	53.90	Oral Grant (JAM)	50.48

=== Girls under 17 (Youth) ===
Event	Gold		Silver		Bronze	
100 metres	Catherine Scott (JAM)	11.92	Merlene Frazer (JAM)	11.93	Valeska Browne (BAH)	12.23
200 metres	Mervette Collins (VIN)	24.8	Merlene Frazer (JAM)	25.0	Carmetta McKay (BAH)	25.1
400 metres	Catherine Scott (JAM)	54.12	Wynsome Cole (JAM)	55.77	Vernetta Rolle (BAH)	56.18
800 metres	Janice Turner (JAM)	2:11.6	Vernetta Rolle (BAH)	2:13.5	Sherone Walker (JAM)	2:17.8
1500 metres	Janice Turner (JAM)	4:45.68	Sherone Walker (JAM)	4:51.75	Christine St. Cyr (GRN)	4:54.75
High jump	Najuma Fletcher (GUY)	1.72	Icolyn Kelly (JAM)	1.66	Lacena Golding (JAM)	1.58
Long jump	Dedra Davis (BAH)	5.88	Merlene Frazer (JAM)	5.81	Raquel Morrison (CAY)	5.35
Shot put	Murielle Flamand (MTQ)	10.83	Dominique Perroni (MTQ)	10.81	Lisa Casimir (DMA)	10.60
Discus throw	Murielle Flamand (MTQ)	32.38	Hughette Robertson (GUY)	32.26	Marcia Taylor (BAH)	31.96
Javelin throw	Patrice Scotland (BER)	39.14	Lisa Casimir (DMA)	37.22	Marsha Mark (TRI)	37.18

== Medal table (unofficial) ==
* Host nation (Barbados)

Rank	Nation	Gold	Silver	Bronze	Total
1	Jamaica (JAM)	26	16	15	57
2	Bahamas (BAH)	7	10	11	28
3	Martinique (MTQ)	4	5	2	11
4	Trinidad and Tobago (TTO)	4	4	5	13
5	Guyana (GUY)	2	1	2	5
6	Netherlands Antilles (AHO)	2	1	0	3
7	Barbados (BAR)*	1	5	1	7
8	Cayman Islands (CAY)	1	1	3	5
9	Bermuda (BER)	1	1	0	2
10	Saint Vincent and the Grenadines (VIN)	1	0	1	2
11	Antigua and Barbuda (ATG)	1	0	0	1
12	Grenada (GRN)	0	2	3	5
13	Dominica (DMA)	0	2	2	4
14	Saint Kitts and Nevis (SKN)	0	1	1	2
14	Saint Lucia (LCA)	0	1	1	2
16	Guadeloupe (GLP)	0	0	2	2
17	British Virgin Islands (IVB)	0	0	1	1
Totals (17 entries)		50	50	50	150
