= 1991 CARIFTA Games =

XX CARIFTA Games
- Dates: March 30-April 1
- Host city: Port of Spain, Trinidad and Tobago
- Level: Junior and Youth
- Events: 53
- Participation: about 212 athletes from about 18 nations

The 20th CARIFTA Games was held in Port of Spain, Trinidad and Tobago on March 30-April 1, 1991. An appraisal of the results has been given on the occasion of 40th anniversary of the games.

== Participation (unofficial) ==
Detailed result lists can be found on the "World Junior Athletics History" website. An unofficial count yields the number of about 212 athletes (128 junior (under-20) and 88 youth (under-17)) from about 18 countries: Antigua and Barbuda (1), Bahamas (27), Barbados (26), Bermuda (6), British Virgin Islands (3), Cayman Islands (7), Dominica (3), French Guiana (3), Grenada (9), Guadeloupe (12), Guyana (5), Jamaica (42), Martinique (19), Saint Kitts and Nevis (3), Saint Lucia (3), Saint Vincent and the Grenadines (2), Trinidad and Tobago (39), US Virgin Islands (1).

== Austin Sealy Award ==
The Austin Sealy Trophy for the most outstanding athlete of the games was awarded to Inez Turner from Jamaica. She won 2 gold medals (400m, and 800m) in the junior (U-20) category. In addition, she was probably part of at least one of the medal winning relay teams (there is no information on the team members).

== Medal summary ==
Medal winners are published by category: Boys under 20 (Junior), Girls under 20 (Junior), Boys under 17 (Youth), and Girls under 17 (Youth). Complete results can be found on the "World Junior Athletics History" website.

=== Boys under 20 (Junior) ===
Event	Gold		Silver		Bronze	
100 metres	Kirk Cummins (BAR)	10.59	Alex Ménal (GLP)	10.70	Rudolph Mighty (JAM)	10.75
200 metres	Andrew Tynes (BAH)	21.11	Marcus Knowles (BAH)	21.39	Rudolph Mighty (JAM)	21.48
400 metres	Carl McPherson (JAM)	46.84	Marcus Knowles (BAH)	46.92	Hayden Stephen (TRI)	46.98
800 metres	Lamont Leach (JAM)	1:52.95	Bruno Sousseing (TRI)	1:53.37	Dudley Dawkins (JAM)	1:53.87
1500 metres	Quinton John (TRI)	3:51.45	Dudley Dawkins (JAM)	3:55.46	Lennox Ellis (BAR)	3:56.41
5000 metres	Quinton John (TRI)	14:58.46	Jermaine Mitchell (JAM)	15:24.61		
3000 metres steeplechase	Junior Mitchell (TRI)	9:59.62				
110 metres hurdles (4.9 m/s)	Errol Byles (JAM)	13.39w	Sean Dupigny (BAR)	13.97w	Neil Gardner (JAM)	14.73w
400 metres hurdles	Mitchell Francis (JAM)	51.99	Errol Byles (JAM)	52.85	Lynden Hepburn (BAH)	53.90
High jump	Gladston Morrison (JAM)	2.07	Victor Houston (BAR)	2.05	Dennis Fearon (JAM)	1.99
Pole vault	Pascal Elisabeth (MTQ)	3.90	Shawn Cousins (JAM)	3.65		
Long jump	Keita Cline (IVB)	7.42	Everald Facey (JAM)	7.38	Lester Anthony (TRI)	7.35
Triple jump	Kenny Boudine (GUF)	15.48	Victor Houston (BAR)	15.17	Neil Gardner (JAM)	14.97
Shot put	Désir Coquin (GLP)	14.52	Jean-Claude Valentin (MTQ)	14.40	Robert Holdsworth (JAM)	13.99
Discus throw	Howard Brown (JAM)	40.60	Olu Tinubu (BAH)	39.16	Thierry Lovis (MTQ)	38.84
Javelin throw	Kim Fullerton (GRN)	55.32	Ronnie Darville (BAH)	51.50	Pascal Elisabeth (MTQ)	51.00
4 × 100 metres relay	Jamaica	41.29	Bahamas	41.78	Guadeloupe	41.78
4 × 400 metres relay	Jamaica	3:11.79	Trinidad and Tobago	3:14.93	Barbados	3:15.35

=== Girls under 20 (Junior) ===
Event	Gold		Silver		Bronze	
100 metres (1.7 m/s)	Nikole Mitchell (JAM)	11.40	Savatheda Fynes (BAH)	11.64	Merlene Frazer (JAM)	11.74
200 metres	Nikole Mitchell (JAM)	23.48	Merlene Frazer (JAM)	23.86	Joy-Ann Eli (BAR)	24.17
400 metres	Inez Turner (JAM)	53.80	Jacqueline Gayle (JAM)	54.66	Shermaine Ross (GRN)	55.87
800 metres	Inez Turner (JAM)	2:08.36	Karen Bennett (JAM)	2:09.05	Dawn Williams (DMA)	2:14.05
1500 metres	Janice Turner (JAM)	4:31.33	Karen Bennett (JAM)	4:32.4	Charmaine Thomas (ATG)	4:59.1
3000 metres	Janice Turner (JAM)	9:50.56	Evette Turner (JAM)	9:52.57	Geraldine McQueen (GRN)	10:08.2
100 metres hurdles (4.4 m/s)	Nadège Joseph (GUF)	14.08w	Astia Walker (JAM)	14.60w	Karlene Haughton (JAM)	14.65w
High jump	Icolyn Kelly (JAM)	1.64	Germaine Gordon (TRI)	???	Jill Ann Nicome (TRI)	???
Long jump	Dedra Davis (BAH)	6.35	Icolyn Kelly (JAM)	5.91	Germaine Gordon (TRI)	5.65
Shot put	Michelle Garvey (BAR)	12.54	Laurita Burrows (BER)	11.88	Dominique Perroni (MTQ)	11.72
Discus throw	Kadar Thomas (JAM)	36.82	Marcia Taylor (BAH)	36.62	Hughette Robertson (GUY)	34.86
Javelin throw	Marsha Mark (TRI)	45.88	Lisa Casimir (DMA)	44.40	Patricia Scotland (BER)	41.78
4 × 100 metres relay	Jamaica	45.49	Guadeloupe	46.26	Martinique	46.80
4 × 400 metres relay	Jamaica	3:41.80	Bahamas	3:48.38	Barbados	3:49.30

=== Boys under 17 (Youth) ===
Event	Gold		Silver		Bronze	
100 metres (2.6 m/s)	Obadele Thompson (BAR)	10.5w	Nigel Baptiste (TRI)	10.6w	Gilles Ricard (GLP)	10.7w
200 metres	Edward Clarke (JAM)	21.89	Nigel Baptiste (TRI)	22.15	Obadele Thompson (BAR)	22.26
400 metres	Edward Clarke (JAM)	48.37	Davian Clarke (JAM)	48.43	Jonathan Pollard (BAR)	48.47
800 metres	Michael McDonald (JAM)	1:56.02	Leo Samuel (JAM)	1:56.14	Ryan Moore (BAR)	1:59.31
1500 metres	Junior Boxill (BAR)	4:10.3	Preston Campbell (JAM)	4:17.8	Michael McDonald (JAM)	4:20.8
High jump	Stephen Woodley (BER)	1.90	Kerl Chai Hong (TRI)	1.80	Quinton Brennan (BAH)	1.75
Long jump	Devon Bean (BER)	7.01	Joseph Brown (BAH)	6.59	Mark Blake (JAM)	6.49
Triple jump	Devon Bean (BER)	14.58	Eddy Montoussany (GLP)	14.21	Kerl Chai Hong (TRI)	12.85
Shot put	Mark Ray (BAR)	12.20	Anthony Alexander (TRI)	11.24	Keith Brewster (BAR)	11.16
Discus throw	Keith Brewster (BAR)	36.64	Dominic Powell (CAY)	33.20	Mark Ray (BAR)	32.44
Javelin throw	Dominic Powell (CAY)	49.50	Keith Brewster (BAR)	47.26	Jeff Goddard (CAY)	44.32

=== Girls under 17 (Youth) ===
Event	Gold		Silver		Bronze	
100 metres (2.4 m/s)	Debbie Ferguson (BAH)	11.89w	Patricia Buval (MTQ)	11.91w	Astia Walker (JAM)	11.99w
200 metres	Astia Walker (JAM)	24.34	Michelle O'Hara (JAM)	24.41	Debbie Ferguson (BAH)	24.86
400 metres	Claudine Williams (JAM)	55.41	Vernetta Rolle (BAH)	56.05	Charmaine Howell (JAM)	57.90
800 metres	Claudine Williams (JAM)	2:12.66	Vernetta Rolle (BAH)	2:13.76	Charmaine Howell (JAM)	2:13.80
1500 metres	Korene Hinds (JAM)	4:37.84	Evette Turner (JAM)	4:38.48	Geraldine McQueen (GRN)	4:50.13
High jump	Lacena Golding (JAM)	1.62	Tamara Malcolm (BAH)	1.59	Cherry King (BER)	1.55
Long jump	Suzette Lee (JAM)	5.99	Lacena Golding (JAM)	5.92	Mernette Forde (BAR)	5.34
Shot put	Anne-Marie Marival (GLP)	12.38	Trudi Holder (BAR)	9.76	Merril Peters (GRN)	8.76
Discus throw	Lacena Golding (JAM)	31.44	Patricia Lewis (TRI)	29.76	Trudi Holder (BAR)	29.50
Javelin throw	Merril Peters (GRN)	36.56	Cleopatra Francis (TRI)	28.40	Vanessa Blyden (BAH)	28.08

== Medal table (unofficial) ==
* Host nation (Trinidad and Tobago)

Rank	Nation	Gold	Silver	Bronze	Total
1	Jamaica (JAM)	28	18	14	60
2	Barbados (BAR)	6	5	11	22
3	Trinidad and Tobago (TTO)*	4	9	5	18
4	Bahamas (BAH)	3	12	4	19
5	Bermuda (BER)	3	1	2	6
6	Guadeloupe (GLP)	2	3	2	7
7	Grenada (GRN)	2	0	4	6
8	French Guiana (GUF)	2	0	0	2
9	Martinique (MTQ)	1	2	4	7
10	Cayman Islands (CAY)	1	1	1	3
11	British Virgin Islands (IVB)	1	0	0	1
12	Dominica (DMA)	0	1	1	2
13	Antigua and Barbuda (ATG)	0	0	1	1
13	Guyana (GUY)	0	0	1	1
Totals (14 entries)		53	52	50	155
