= Donovan Powell =

Jamaican sprinter (born 1971)

Personal information
- Born: 31 October 1971 (age 54) Linstead, Jamaica
- Height: 1.83 m (6 ft 0 in)
- Weight: 79 kg (174 lb)
- Relative: Asafa Powell (brother)

Sport
- Sport: Track and field
- Events: 60 metres, 100 metres
- College team: TCU Horned Frogs
Medal record
Men's Athletics
Representing Jamaica
USATF Indoor Track & Field Championship
| Gold medal – first place | 1996 Atlanta | 60 m |
CAC Junior Championships (U20)
| Gold medal – first place | 1990 Havana | 100 m |
| Silver medal – second place | 1990 Havana | 4x100 m relay |
CARIFTA Games (Under 20s)
| Gold medal – first place | 1989 Bridgetown | 4x100 m relay |
| Gold medal – first place | 1990 Kingston | 200 m |
| Gold medal – first place | 1990 Kingston | 4x100 m relay |
| Silver medal – second place | 1989 Bridgetown | 100 m |
| Silver medal – second place | 1989 Bridgetown | 200 m |

Donovan Powell (born 31 October 1971 in Linstead, Jamaica) is a former sprinter who specialised in the 60 metres and 100 metres events. He is the brother of Asafa Powell, a former 100 m world record holder.

Powell had his first successes at the CARIFTA Games, where he won two silver medals in 1989, before taking the 200 metres title in 1990. He first represented Jamaica at the global level at the 1993 IAAF World Indoor Championships. He began attending Texas Christian University and had success at the 1994 NCAA championships, taking third in the 100 m and anchoring the TCU Horned Frogs to a relay gold. The next year he took a silver medal over 55 metres indoors and won another silver outdoors, setting his 10.07 seconds personal best for the 100 m.

He qualified for the 1995 World Championships with a second place at the Jamaican National Championships, but his test from the competition came back positive for the stimulant ephedrine and he was banned for three months. After returning to competition he ran at the 1997 World Championships (reaching the quarter-finals) and he was sixth in the final of the 60 m at the 1999 IAAF World Indoor Championships. He represented Jamaica at the Olympics at the 2000 Sydney Games, running in the relay heats.

His final international appearance came at the 2001 CAC Championships, where he was seventh in the 100 m final. He retired from athletics in 2002 and is now a youth track coach in Texas.

== Career ==
Powell attended St. Jago High School in Spanish Town and Texas Christian University in Fort Worth, Texas. He represented the TCU Horned Frogs while studying at the university.

=== 1989 ===
Powell finished second in the Under 20 Men 100m at the CARIFTA Games, time 10.64 s, second in the 200 m in 21.8 s and first in the 4 × 100 m relay in 40.4 s

=== 1990 ===
Powell famously defeated Daniel England in the Class one 200 m at the ISSA High School Championships, giving England his only loss in four years at the Championships.

At the CARIFTA Games he won the Under 20 Men 200 m in 21.42 s (wind -3.7 m/s) as well as the 4 × 100 m relay in 40.66 s

=== 1993 ===
Competing at the IAAF World Indoor Championships Powell finished sixth in his heat, time 7.02 s.

=== 1994 ===
Powell finished third in the 100 m at the NCAA Outdoor Championships and anchored the TCU 4 × 100 m relay team to first place.

=== 1995 ===
At the NCAA Indoor Championships in Indianapolis, Indiana, Powell finished second in the 55 m, his time 6.19 On 19 May Powell was hand timed at 9.7 s in Houston. It is a disqualified time for record purposes.

Powell repeated his success at the NCAA Outdoor Championships, again anchoring the TCU 4 × 100 m relay team to first place, and finished second in the 100 m in his personal best 10.07. He finished second in the 100 m at the Jamaican National Championships with a run of 10.15 seconds. At the Bislett Games in July he ran 10.13 in the heats and then took second behind Linford Christie, running 10.15 seconds into a headwind.

Powell received a three-month ban from competition for a doping offense as his test was positive for the stimulant ephedrine. He was disqualified from participating in the 1995 World Championships in Athletics.

=== 1996 ===
In January Powell finished second by 0.01 seconds to Donovan Bailey in the 60 m at the Montreal Grand Prix. He had previously finished second to Bailey in the 50 m one week prior in Hamilton, and second again two days later in the 60 m behind Bruny Surin.

Later in January, he won the 60 m at the Boston Indoor Games, in 6.64 s.

He won the 60 m at the Atlanta US Indoor Championships in 6.55s in March.

Powell won the May Golden Spike meeting in Ostrava. His time of 10.13 is listed as the sixth fastest in the history of the event.

=== 1997 ===
After the 1996 season his form declined and he did not manage to run under 10.20 seconds for the rest of his career. Slowest out of the starting blocks, Powell finished sixth in his second round heat of the 100 m at the Athens World Championships in 10.35 s, and did not progress to the next round. The Jamaican team did not start the first heat of the 4 × 100 m relay, for which Powell was supposed to run first leg.

=== 1998 ===
At the Texas A&M All-Comers on 9 May, Powell recorded the fastest time in the 100 m, 10.16 s. This time made Powell the tenth ranked Commonwealth Athlete for the period January to August.

=== 1999 ===
In the February Stockholm Indoor Meeting Powell finished fourth in the 60 m final, in 6.68 s.

At the 1999 IAAF World Indoor Championships in Maebashi, Japan Powell finished sixth in the 60 m final with a time of 6.59 s.

=== 2000 ===
At the Sprint Invitational Track & Field Meet in January Powell finished fourth in heat one of the 60 m, in 6.78 s.

Powell ran the first leg of the 4 × 100 m relay in round one of competition at the Sydney Olympics. The team qualified for the semi-final with a time of 38.97 and eventually finished fourth in the final without Powell running a leg.

At the Texas relays in April Powell helped to win the 4 × 100 m relay in 39.16, along with teammates Milton Mallard, Kareem Streete-Thompson and Obadele Thompson.

In August Powell finished fourth in 10.44 in the 100 m in Lappeenranta, Finland.

=== 2001 ===
In February Powell won his heat of the University of Houston/Runsport All-Comers meet. His 60 m time was 6.88s.

Powell finished seventh in the 100 m at the Jamaica National Championships in June, his time 10.31 s.

At the CAC Championships in Guatemala City Powell finished seventh in the 100 m, his time 10.51 s. The 4 × 100 m relay team qualified with the second fastest time but recorded a DNF in the final.

=== Post competition life ===
Powell is now a youth track coach in Texas. He also conducts speed enhancement clinics at other locals.

== Personal bests ==
His personal best in the 50 m event is the second fastest time by a Jamaican.

| Event | Time (seconds) | Venue | Date |
|---|---|---|---|
| 50 metres | 5.64 | Liévin, France | 21 February 1999 |
| 60 metres | 6.51 | Atlanta, United States | 2 March 1996 |
| 100 metres | 10.07 | Knoxville, United States | 3 June 1995 |
| 200 metres | 20.83 | Cayenne, French Guiana | 4 May 2002 |

All information taken from IAAF profile.

== Personal life ==
In 2002 one of Donovan's brothers, Michael Powell, was shot dead in a taxi in New York.

In 2003 Donovan lost another brother, Vaughn Powell, who suffered a random heart attack while playing a game of American Football.

In April 2007 Corey Reid, an uncle of Powell, was stabbed in Waterloo, Ewarton, St. Catherine. He later died in hospital.

== Achievements ==
| Year | Competition | Venue | Position | Event | Notes |
Representing Jamaica
| 1989 | CARIFTA Games (U-20) | Bridgetown, Barbados | 2nd | 100 m | 10.64 |
| 1989 | CARIFTA Games (U-20) | Bridgetown, Barbados | 2nd | 200 m | 21.8 |
| 1989 | CARIFTA Games (U-20) | Bridgetown, Barbados | 1st | 4 × 100 m relay | 40.4 |
| 1990 | CARIFTA Games (U-20) | Kingston, Jamaica | — | 100 m | DNS |
| 1990 | CARIFTA Games (U-20) | Kingston, Jamaica | 1st | 200 m | 21.42 (-3.7 m/s) |
| 1990 | Central American and Caribbean Junior Championships (U-20) | Havana, Cuba | 1st | 100 m | 10.48 (-0.1 m/s) |
| 1990 | Central American and Caribbean Junior Championships (U-20) | Havana, Cuba | 2nd | 4 × 100 m relay | 40.66 |
| 1990 | World Junior Championships | Plovdiv, Bulgaria | 5th | 100m | 10.44 (wind: +0.6 m/s) |
| 1990 | World Junior Championships | Plovdiv, Bulgaria | 7th | 4 × 100 m relay | 40.06 |
| 1997 | World Championships | Athens, Greece | 6th (qf) | 100 m | 10.35 (-0.3 m/s) |
| 1997 | World Championships | Athens, Greece | — | 4 × 100 m relay | DNS |
| 2000 | Olympic Games | Sydney, Australia | 4th (h) | 4 × 100 m relay | 38.97 |

== See also ==
- List of doping cases in athletics
