= 2001 IAAF World Indoor Championships – Women's 4 × 400 metres relay =

The women's 4 × 400 metres relay event at the 2001 IAAF World Indoor Championships was held on March 11.

== Results ==
=== Final ===
Rank	Nation	Competitors	Time	Notes
1st place, gold medalist(s)	Russia	Yuliya Nosova, Olesya Zykina, Yuliya Sotnikova, Olga Kotlyarova	3:30.00	WL
2nd place, silver medalist(s)	Jamaica	Charmaine Howell, Juliet Campbell, Catherine Scott, Sandie Richards	3:30.79	
3rd place, bronze medalist(s)	Germany	Claudia Marx, Birgit Rockmeier, Florence Ekpo-Umoh, Shanta Ghosh	3:31.00	
4	United States	Monique Hennagan, Donna Howard, Kelli White, Tasha Downing	3:32.76	
