= 1987 CARIFTA Games =

XVI CARIFTA Games
- Dates: April 18–20
- Host city: Port of Spain, Trinidad and Tobago
- Level: Junior and Youth
- Events: 52
- Participation: at least 115 athletes from at least 13 nations

The 16th CARIFTA Games was held in Port of Spain, Trinidad and Tobago on April 18–20, 1987.

== Participation (unofficial) ==
For the 1987 CARIFTA Games, only the medalists can be found on the "World Junior Athletics History" website. An unofficial count yields the number of about 115 medalists (67 junior (under-20) and 48 youth (under-17)) from about 13 countries: Bahamas (23), Barbados (11), Bermuda (2), Cayman Islands (4), Dominica (2), Guadeloupe (5), Guyana (2), Jamaica (36), Martinique (9), Netherlands Antilles (1), Saint Kitts and Nevis (2), Saint Vincent and the Grenadines (4), Trinidad and Tobago (14).

== Austin Sealy Award ==
The Austin Sealy Trophy for the most outstanding athlete of the games was awarded to Nicole Springer from Barbados. She won the high jump gold medal in the junior (U-20) category.

== Medal summary ==
Medal winners are published by category: Boys under 20 (Junior), Girls under 20 (Junior), Boys under 17 (Youth), and Girls under 17 (Youth). The medalists can also be found on the "World Junior Athletics History" website.

=== Boys under 20 (Junior) ===
Event	Gold		Silver		Bronze	
100 metres	Eric Haynes (SKN)	10.60w	Olivier Théophile (GLP)	10.67w	Cyrus Allen (JAM)	10.72w
200 metres (0.7 m/s)	Alvin Daniel (TRI)	20.94	Carey Johnson (JAM)	21.12	Richard Hinds (BAR)	21.17
400 metres	Thomas Mason (JAM)	46.82	Christian Landre-Cornano (GLP)	47.05	Anthony Wallace (JAM)	47.62
800 metres	Kenroy Levy (JAM)	1:48.95	Fitzroy Morrison (JAM)	1:50.59	Eversley Linley (VIN)	1:52.00
1500 metres	Kenroy Levy (JAM)	3:53.1	Sherwin Burgess (JAM)	3:55.2	Manuel Joseph (TRI)	3:56.3
5000 metres	Sherwin Burgess (JAM)	15:14.56	Anthony Johnson (JAM)	15:14.77	Martin Forde (BAR)	15:14.99
110 metres hurdles	Andrew Smith (BAH)	14.24w	Anthony Ricketts (JAM)	14.35w	Roy Browne (BAR)	14.44w
400 metres hurdles	Thomas Mason (JAM)	53.14	Roy Browne (BAR)	54.05	Wellesley Wellington (JAM)	54.54
High jump	Joël Vincent (MTQ)	2.15	Ian Thompson (BAH)	2.09	François Jacaria (MTQ)	2.09
Pole vault	Brent Johnson (BAH)	4.26	Adrian Knowles (BAH)	4.05	Lionel Gabaud (MTQ)	3.85
Long jump	Edward Manderson (CAY)	7.40	Germain Martial (MTQ)	7.40	Mark Mason (GUY)	7.37
Triple jump	Edward Manderson (CAY)	15.95	Eddy Falibois (GLP)	14.65	Alvin Haynes (BAR)	14.61
Shot put	Teddy Lacroix (MTQ)	14.38	Troy Patterson (BAR)	13.84	Jean-Claude Retel (GLP)	13.78
Discus throw	Kenneth Blackwood (JAM)	43.64	Troy Patterson (BAR)	42.70	Jeffrey Marcelle (TRI)	42.32
Javelin throw	Jean-René Ceylan (MTQ)	65.52	Kevin Smith (BAH)	59.06	Ricky Francis (TRI)	58.18
4 × 100 metres relay	Jamaica	40.73	Trinidad and Tobago	41.14	Saint Kitts and Nevis	41.44
4 × 400 metres relay	Jamaica	3:08.28	Trinidad and Tobago	3:16.67	Barbados	3:26.88

=== Girls under 20 (Junior) ===
Event	Gold		Silver		Bronze	
100 metres	Beverly McDonald (JAM)	11.54	Sheena Sturrup (BAH)	11.75	Nicole Charles (TRI)	11.76
200 metres (0.2 m/s)	Beverly McDonald (JAM)	23.40	Nicole Charles (TRI)	23.63	Sheena Sturrup (BAH)	23.69
400 metres	Juliet Campbell (JAM)	53.36	Diane Dunrod (SKN)	54.04	Jackie Hinds (BAR)	55.55
800 metres	Sylvia Thomas (athlete) (JAM)	2:11.80	Sandra Boothe (JAM)	2:13.35	Danielle Nepert (MTQ)	2:14.6
1500 metres	Sylvia Thomas (athlete) (JAM)	4:42.8	Sandra Boothe (JAM)	4:44.4	Charlene Neptune (TRI)	4:50.0
3000 metres	Charlene Neptune (TRI)	10:38.4	Golda McLean (VIN)	10:58.8	Dawn Williams (DMA)	11:07.9
100 metres hurdles	Sophia Brown (JAM)	14.18	Dianne Woodside (BAH)	14.29	Michelle Freeman (JAM)	14.32
High jump	Nicole Springer (BAR)	1.79	Marlene Gordon (JAM)	1.68	Michelle Alleyne (TRI)	1.68
Long jump	Jacqueline Ross (VIN)	5.73	Natasha Brown (BAH)	5.72	Twilet Malcolm (JAM)	5.69
Shot put	Marie-José Alger (MTQ)	12.90	Dawn Woodside (BAH)	12.27	Millicent McCartney (BAH)	12.16
Discus throw	Millicent McCartney (BAH)	42.40	Denise Taylor (BAH)	39.58	Leslie Rooks (BER)	36.88
Javelin throw	Terry-Lynn Paynter (BER)	40.06	Dawn Woodside (BAH)	39.72	Chantell Miller (BAH)	39.60
4 × 100 metres relay	Jamaica	45.63	Trinidad and Tobago	46.52	Bahamas	46.76
4 × 400 metres relay	Jamaica	3:41.1	Barbados	3:48.5	Bahamas	3:50.6

=== Boys under 17 (Youth) ===
Event	Gold		Silver		Bronze	
100 metres	Peter Harker (JAM)	11.05	Anthony Richards (JAM)	11.12	Adrian Bobb (TRI)	11.14
200 metres	Daniel England (JAM)	21.89	Randy Neely (BAH)	22.27	Anthony Richards (JAM)	22.30
400 metres	Daniel England (JAM)	48.8	Ronald Thorne (BAR)	49.2	Terry Harewood (BAR)	49.8
800 metres	Clarence Richards (JAM)	1:57.66	Floyd Howell (JAM)	1:57.67	Sheku Bell (TRI)	1:59.99
1500 metres	Floyd Howell (JAM)	4:08.23	Simeon McDowell (JAM)	4:11.20	Codrington McPherson (GUY)	4:11.29
High jump	Garreth Flowers (BAH)	2.03	Steve LeBlanc (DMA)	2.00	Adrian Gilbert (BAH)	1.92
Long jump	Kareem Streete-Thompson (CAY)	6.91	Bernardo Henry (JAM)	6.74	Neil Edwards (BAH)	6.63
Triple jump	Neil Edwards (BAH)	14.39	Saville Sayers (VIN)	14.14	Sextus Daniel (GLP)	13.95
Shot put	Andrew Hercules (TRI)	12.64	Carrington Maycock (BAH)	12.49	Glenton Evans (JAM)	12.32
Discus throw	Glenton Evans (JAM)	43.04	Robert Taylor (BAH)	42.78	Ryan Haylock (CAY)	40.00
Javelin throw	Angelo Rolle (BAH)	54.60	Ryan Haylock (CAY)	47.72	Robert Taylor (BAH)	47.56

=== Girls under 17 (Youth) ===
Event	Gold		Silver		Bronze	
100 metres	Karen Chevalleau (JAM)	12.06	Andria Lloyd (JAM)	12.18	Jackie Edwards (BAH)	12.24
200 metres	Revoli Campbell (JAM)	23.45w	Andria Lloyd (JAM)	24.28w	Diana Murphy (BAR)	24.35w
400 metres	Revoli Campbell (JAM)	54.4	Diana Murphy (BAR)	55.7	Catherine Scott (JAM)	56.0
800 metres	Karen Bennett (JAM)	2:10.7	Marlene Cyrus (BAR)	2:17.5	Jacqueline Sophia (AHO)	2:17.9
1500 metres	Karen Bennett (JAM)	4:33.2	Barbara Stewart (JAM)	4:39.1	Marlene Cyrus (BAR)	4:50.3
High jump	Joyce Evans (JAM)	1.66	Carabell James (TRI)	1.66	Raquel Morrison (CAY)	1.57
Long jump	Jackie Edwards (BAH)	6.14	Angela Rochester (JAM)	5.54	Denise Lewis (TRI)	5.22
Shot put	Verne Alleyne (TRI)	10.36	Véronique Boniface (MTQ)	10.36	Tiffany Thompson (BAH)	10.00
Discus throw	Tiffany Thompson (BAH)	32.58	Verne Alleyne (TRI)	31.94	Kay Lewis (JAM)	31.70
Javelin throw	Kayla Campbell (BAH)	35.60	Charmaine Hamilton (BAH)	32.76	Geraldine George (TRI)	32.44

== Medal table (unofficial) ==
* Host nation (Trinidad and Tobago)

Rank	Nation	Gold	Silver	Bronze	Total
1	Jamaica (JAM)	28	16	9	53
2	Bahamas (BAH)	9	13	10	32
3	Trinidad and Tobago (TTO)*	4	6	10	20
4	Martinique (MTQ)	4	2	3	9
5	Cayman Islands (CAY)	3	1	2	6
6	Barbados (BAR)	1	7	9	17
7	Saint Vincent and the Grenadines (VIN)	1	2	1	4
8	Saint Kitts and Nevis (SKN)	1	1	1	3
9	Bermuda (BER)	1	0	1	2
10	Guadeloupe (GLP)	0	3	2	5
11	Dominica (DMA)	0	1	1	2
12	Guyana (GUY)	0	0	2	2
13	Netherlands Antilles (AHO)	0	0	1	1
Totals (13 entries)		52	52	52	156
