= Dedra Davis =

Bahamian athlete

Personal information
- Born: 17 July 1973 (age 53)

Sport
- Sport: Athletics
- Events: Long jump, 100 metres

Dedra Davis (born 17 July 1973) is a retired Bahamian athlete who specialised in the long jump and sprinting events. She represented her country at the 1993 World Championships.

Davis started her NCAA career with the Missouri State Lady Bears track and field team. After sitting out her first year due to Proposition 48, she became their first automatic NCAA qualifier and placed 5th in the long jump at the 1992 NCAA Division I Outdoor Track and Field Championships.

She transferred to the Tennessee Volunteers women's track and field team for the 1992-93 season. For the Volunteers, she won the 1994 NCAA Division I Outdoor Track and Field Championships in the long jump.

== International competitions ==
| Year | Competition | Venue | Position | Event | Notes |
Representing the Bahamas
| 1989 | CARIFTA Games (U17) | Bridgetown, Barbados | 1st | Long jump | 5.88 m |
| 1990 | CARIFTA Games (U20) | Kingston, Jamaica | 2nd | Long jump | 6.14 m |
| 1990 | Central American and Caribbean; Junior Championships (U20) | Havana, Cuba | 3rd | 4 × 100 m relay | 47.44 |
| 1990 | Central American and Caribbean; Junior Championships (U20) | Havana, Cuba | 3rd | Long jump | 5.84 m |
| 1991 | CARIFTA Games (U20) | Port of Spain, Trinidad and Tobago | 6th | 200 m | 24.80 |
| 1991 | CARIFTA Games (U20) | Port of Spain, Trinidad and Tobago | 5th | 400 m | 57.40 |
| 1991 | CARIFTA Games (U20) | Port of Spain, Trinidad and Tobago | 1st | Long jump | 6.35 m |
| 1992 | CARIFTA Games (U20) | Nassau, Bahamas | 3rd | 100 m | 11.61 (w) |
| 1992 | CARIFTA Games (U20) | Nassau, Bahamas | 2nd | 4 × 100 m relay | 45.61 |
| 1992 | CARIFTA Games (U20) | Nassau, Bahamas | 1st | Long jump | 6.30 m |
| 1992 | Central American and Caribbean; Junior Championships (U20) | Tegucigalpa, Honduras | 1st | 100 m | 12.0 |
| 1992 | Central American and Caribbean; Junior Championships (U20) | Tegucigalpa, Honduras | 1st | Long jump | 6.00 m |
| 1993 | Universiade | Buffalo, United States | 4th | Long jump | 6.49 m |
| 1993 | World Championships | Stuttgart, Germany | 37th (h) | 100 m | 12.00 |
| 1993 | World Championships | Stuttgart, Germany | 26th (q) | Long jump | 6.11 m |
| 1994 | Commonwealth Games | Victoria, Canada | 5th | 4 × 100 m relay | 44.89 |
| 1994 | Commonwealth Games | Victoria, Canada | 11th | Long jump | 5.98 m |

== Personal bests ==
Outdoor

- 100 metres – 11.31 (+1.3 m/s, Knoxville 1994)
- 200 metres – 23.04 (-0.1 m/s, Trento 1996)
- Long jump – 6.49 (Buffalo 1993)

Indoor

- 60 metres – 7.44 (Madrid 1997)
- Long jump – 6.71 (Indianapolis 1994)
