= Alejandro Argudín-Zaharia =

Cuban-Romanian athlete (born 1974)

Personal information
- Nicknames: Charlie, Alex
- Nationality: Romania
- Born: March 10, 1974 (age 52) Havana, Cuba
- Height: 1.74 m (5 ft 8 1/2 in)
- Weight: 143 lb (65 kg)

Alejandro Argudín-Zaharia
Medal record

Men's Athletics

Representing Romania

Jeux de la Francophonie
Gold medal – first place	1997 Antananarivo	400 m hurdles

Alejandro Argudín-Zaharia
Medal record

Men's Athletics

Representing Cuba

Central American and Caribbean Junior Championships
Gold medal – first place	1990 Havana	400 m hurdles

Pan American Junior Athletics Championships
Gold medal – first place	1993 Winnipeg	400 m hurdles

Pan American Junior Athletics Championships
Silver medal – second place	1991 Kingston	4×400 m relay

Pan American Junior Athletics Championships
Silver medal – second place	1993 Winnipeg	4×400 m relay

Central American and Caribbean Junior Championships
Bronze medal – third place	1990 Havana	4×400 m relay

Pan American Junior Athletics Championships
Bronze medal – third place	1991 Kingston	400 m hurdles

Alejandro Argudín-Zaharia (born 10 March 1974 in Havana) is a retired Cuban-Romanian athlete who specialized in the 400 metres hurdles.

== Biography ==
He was born from a Cuban geotechnical engineer father who worked for Embassy of Cuba in Bucharest and a Romanian mother.

His personal best time of 49.22 seconds, achieved when he won the gold medal at the 1997 Jeux de la Francophonie, is also a Romanian record.

Argudin-Zaharia retired in 1998 because of injury citing Achilles tendon rupture, and now works as a fitness instructor.

He was the fitness coach of the kickboxing stars Benjamin Adegbuyi and Bogdan and Andrei Stoica for some years until 2015.
