= Shermaine Ross =

Personal information
- Full name: Shermaine Ross-Phillip
- Nationality: Grenada
- Born: 20 July 1972 (age 53) St. George's, Grenada

Achievements and titles
- Personal best(s): 400m 53.44 (1995); 800m 2:O9.04
Medal record
CARIFTA Games (U20)
Bronze medal – third place	1989 Bridgetown	400m
Bronze medal – third place	1990 Kingston	800m
Bronze medal – third place	1991 Port of Spain	400m

Shermaine Ross (born 20 July 1972) is a former Grenadian sprinter who competed in the Women's 400m competition at the 1992 Summer Olympics. She ran a personal best time of 55.49s in the heats but did not advance to the later rounds. She also represented Grenada at the CARIFTA Games earning 3 consecutive bronze medals from 1989 to 1991.

Competing for the Seton Hall Pirates track and field team, Ross placed 5th at the 1995 NCAA Division I Indoor Track and Field Championships in the 4 × 400 meter relay.

== Competition record ==
Year	Competition	Venue	Position	Event	Notes
Representing Grenada
1989	1989 CARIFTA Games	Bridgetown, Barbados	3rd	400m U20	56.00
1990	1990 CARIFTA Games	Kingston, Jamaica	3rd	800m U20	2:15.80
1991	1991 CARIFTA Games	Port of Spain, Trinidad and Tobago	3rd	400m U20	55.87
