= Ronnie Holassie =

Trinbagonian long-distance runner (born 1971)

Medal record

Men's athletics

Representing Trinidad and Tobago

CARIFTA Games Junior (U20)
Gold medal – first place	1989 Bridgetown	5000m
Gold medal – first place	1990 Kingston	5000m
Silver medal – second place	1988 Kingston	5000m

Ronald Holassie (born July 29, 1971 in Port of Spain) is a male long-distance runner from Trinidad and Tobago, who twice competed for his native country at the Summer Olympics: 1996 and 2000. He set his personal best (2:13:03) in the marathon on April 29, 2001 in Jacksonville, breaking the national record.

== International competitions ==
Year	Competition	Venue	Position	Event	Notes
Representing Trinidad and Tobago
1996	Olympic Games	Atlanta, United States	75th	Marathon	2:27:20
2000	Olympic Games	Sydney, Australia	32nd	Marathon	2:19:24
2001	World Championships	Edmonton, Canada	—	Marathon	DNF
