= Athletics at the 1991 Pan American Games – Women's 800 metres =

Women's 800 metres at the Pan American Games

The women's 800 metres event at the 1991 Pan American Games was held in Havana, Cuba on 7 and 8 August.

== Medalists ==
Gold	Silver	Bronze
Ana Fidelia Quirot; Cuba	Alisa Hill; United States	Celeste Halliday; Suriname

== Results ==
=== Heats ===
Rank	Heat	Name	Nationality	Time	Notes
1	1	Ana Fidelia Quirot	Cuba	2:01.47	Q
2	1	Alisa Hill	United States	2:01.86	Q
3	2	Letitia Vriesde	Suriname	2:03.73	Q
4	2	Celeste Halliday	United States	2:04.27	Q
5	1	Adina Valdez	Trinidad and Tobago	2:04.42	Q
6	2	Daisy Ocasio	Puerto Rico	2:04.58	Q
7	1	Cathy Rattray	Jamaica	2:04.87	q
8	2	Inez Turner	Jamaica	2:05.47	q
9	2	Maura Savón	Cuba	2:07.82	
10	1	Jeanette Wood	Canada	2:08.39	
11	1	Donna Bean	Bermuda	2:10.31	
12	2	Niusha Mancilla	Bolivia	2:13.21	
13	1	Soledad Acerenza	Uruguay	2:13.31	

=== Final ===
Rank	Name	Nationality	Time	Notes
1st place, gold medalist(s)	Ana Fidelia Quirot	Cuba	1:58.71	
2nd place, silver medalist(s)	Alisa Hill	United States	1:59.99	
3rd place, bronze medalist(s)	Celeste Halliday	United States	2:01.41	
4	Letitia Vriesde	Suriname	2:01.46	
5	Inez Turner	Jamaica	2:02.68	
6	Daisy Ocasio	Puerto Rico	2:05.46	
7	Adina Valdez	Trinidad and Tobago	2:07.86	
8	Cathy Rattray	Jamaica	2:08.21	
