= Florence Ekpo-Umoh =

Nigerian-German sprinter

Florence Ekpo-Umoh (born 27 December 1977 in Lagos) is a Nigerian-German sprinter, who specializes in the 400 m. She was suspended from competing for two years for doping.

== Career ==
Ekpo-Umoh last competed for her birth country Nigeria at the 1994 World Junior Championships. She defected to Germany in 1995 during a training camp there, married her German trainer in 1998 and received German citizenship in 2000. Since 1998, she represented the sports club USC Mainz.

In 2003, Ekpo-Umoh was found guilty of stanozolol doping. The sample was delivered on 24 January 2003 in an out-of-competition test in South Africa. She was suspended from the sport until March 2005.

Her personal best time is 51.13 seconds, achieved in June 2001 in Stuttgart.

== Achievements ==
Year	Competition	Venue	Position	Event	Notes
Representing Nigeria
1994	World Junior Championships	Lisbon, Portugal	8th (sf)	400m	53.84
1994	World Junior Championships	Lisbon, Portugal	14th (h)	4 × 400 m relay	3:49.16
Representing Germany
2001	World Indoor Championships	Lisbon, Portugal	3rd	4 × 400 m relay	3:31.00
2001	World Championships	Edmonton, Canada	2nd	4 × 400 m relay	3:21.97
2002	European Championships	Munich, Germany	1st	4 × 400 m relay	3:25.10
2002	World Cup	Madrid, Spain	6th	4 × 400 m relay	3:31.09

== See also ==
- List of sportspeople sanctioned for doping offences
