= Manuel Joseph =

French writer (1965–2021)

- Born: 22 May 1965; Aubervilliers, France
- Died: October 2021 (aged 56)
- Occupation: Writer

Manuel Joseph (22 May 1965 – October 2021) was a French writer.

== Works ==
- Heroes are heroes are (1994)
- Edenadale (1994)
- La Gueule de l'emploi (1999)
- Ça m'a même pas fait mal (2001)
- Amilka aime Pessoa (2002)
- De la sculpture considérée comme une tauromachie (2003)
- Le Bleu du ciel dans la peau (2009)
- La Sécurité des personnes et des biens (2010)
- La Tête au carré (2010)
- Exhibiting Poetry Today: Manuel Joseph, catalogue de l’exposition de Thomas Hirschhorn (2010)
- Les Baisetioles (2020)
