= Kareem Streete-Thompson =

Caymanian-American athlete

Personal information
- Nationality: Cayman Islands United States
- Born: 30 March 1973 (age 53) Ithaca, New York

Sport
- Sport: Athletics
- Events: Long jump, 100 metres
Medal record
Men's athletics
Representing the Cayman Islands
World Indoor Championships
Silver medal – second place	2001 Lisbon	Long Jump
Commonwealth Games
Bronze medal – third place	2002 Manchester	Long Jump
Pan American Games
Silver medal – second place	1999 Winnipeg	Long Jump
World Junior Championships
Bronze medal – third place	1990 Plovdiv	Long Jump

Kareem Streete-Thompson (born March 30, 1973) is a Caymanian-American athlete specializing in the long jump and the 100 metres. He was born in Ithaca, New York.

Although born in the United States, he lived his first 18 years in the Cayman Islands. Originally he represented the Cayman Islands, then the United States, and then from 1999 the Cayman Islands again.

Competing for the Rice Owls track and field program, he won two NCAA titles in the long jump.

Two times in the role, he was awarded the Austin Sealy Trophy for the most outstanding athlete of the 1989 CARIFTA Games and 1990 CARIFTA Games.

In the 2004 Summer Olympics, he participated in the 100 metres, achieving a second place and a season's best time in the heat from which he qualified, before exiting the competition in the second round with a fifth-placed finish. In the long jump competition, he did not qualify for the final.

== Achievements ==
Year	Competition	Venue	Position	Event	Notes
Representing the Cayman Islands
1987	CARIFTA Games (U-17)	Port of Spain, Trinidad and Tobago	1st	Long jump	6.91 m
1988	CARIFTA Games (U-17)	Kingston, Jamaica	1st	Long jump	7.06 m
1988	World Junior Championships	Sudbury, Canada	47th (h)	100m	11.30 (-1.0 m/s)
1988	World Junior Championships	Sudbury, Canada	24th (q)	Long jump	6.84 m (-0.6 m/s)
1989	CARIFTA Games (U-17)	Bridgetown, Barbados	2nd	100 m	10.88
1989	CARIFTA Games (U-17)	Bridgetown, Barbados	3rd	200 m	21.9
1989	CARIFTA Games (U-17)	Bridgetown, Barbados	1st	Long jump	7.83 m
1990	Commonwealth Games	Auckland, New Zealand	29th (qf)	100 m	10.89
1990	Commonwealth Games	Auckland, New Zealand	11th	Long jump	7.53 m
1990	CARIFTA Games (U-20)	Kingston, Jamaica	1st	Long jump	7.94 m
1990	Central American and Caribbean Junior Championships (U-20)	Havana, Cuba	4th	200 m	22.41 (-0.9 m/s)
1990	Central American and Caribbean Junior Championships (U-20)	Havana, Cuba	1st	Long jump	7.97 m (0.3 m/s)
1990	World Junior Championships	Plovdiv, Bulgaria	3rd	Long jump	7.94 m (-0.2 m/s)
1991	Universiade	Sheffield, United Kingdom	(q)	Long jump	7.50 m
1991	World Championships	Tokyo, Japan	38th (q)	Long jump	6.99 m (+0.3 m/s)
1992	Central American and Caribbean Junior Championships (U-20)	Tegucigalpa, Honduras	2nd	100 m	10.6 (0.0 m/s)
1992	Central American and Caribbean Junior Championships (U-20)	Tegucigalpa, Honduras	1st	Long jump	7.57 m
1992	Olympic Games	Barcelona, Spain	46th (h)	100 m	10.78 (-2.2 m/s)
1992	Olympic Games	Barcelona, Spain	38th (q)	Long jump	7.39 m (-0.5 m/s)
Representing United States
1993	Universiade	Buffalo, United States	1st	Long jump	8.22 m (w)
1994	Goodwill Games	St. Petersburg, Russia	3rd	Long jump	8.29 m
1995	World Championships	Gothenburg, Sweden	14th	Long jump	7.43 m (-2.1 m/s)
Representing Cayman Islands
1999	Pan American Games	Winnipeg, Canada	2nd	Long jump	8.12 m
1999	World Championships	Seville, Spain	8th	100 m	10.24 (+0.2 m/s)
1999	World Championships	Seville, Spain	24th (q)	Long jump	7.75 m (+0.2 m/s)
2000	Olympic Games	Sydney, Australia	13th (q)	Long jump	7.99 m (+0.3 m/s)
2001	World Indoor Championships	Lisbon, Portugal	2nd	Long jump	8.16 m
2001	Central American and Caribbean Championships	Guatemala City, Guatemala	1st	Long jump	7.97 m A
2001	World Championships	Edmonton, Canada	5th	Long jump	8.10 m (+0.7 m/s)
2002	Commonwealth Games	Manchester, England	3rd	Long jump	7.89 m (+1.2 m/s)
2003	Central American and Caribbean Championships	St George's, Grenada	8th	4 × 100 m	41.50
2003	Central American and Caribbean Championships	St George's, Grenada	1st	Long jump	8.12 m w
2003	World Championships	Paris, France	15th (q)	Long jump	7.87 m (-1.0 m/s)
2003	Pan American Games	Santo Domingo, Dominican Republic	9th (h)	4 × 100 m	41.10
2003	Pan American Games	Santo Domingo, Dominican Republic	4th	Long jump	7.96 m
2004	Olympic Games	Athens, Greece	21st (qf)	100 m	10.24 (-0.2 m/s)
2004	Olympic Games	Athens, Greece	20th (q)	Long jump	7.85 m (+0.7 m/s)
2006	Commonwealth Games	Melbourne, Australia	23rd (qf)	100 m	10.71 (-0.4 m/s)
2006	Commonwealth Games	Melbourne, Australia	12th (h)	4 × 100 m	40.76
2006	Central American and Caribbean Games	Cartagena, Colombia	14th (sf)	100 m	10.47
