= Charmaine Howell =

Jamaican middle-distance runner

Personal information
- Born: 13 March 1975 (age 51) Trelawny Parish, Jamaica

Sport
- Sport: Track and field
Medal record
Women's Athletics
Representing Jamaica
Olympic Games
| Silver medal – second place | 2000 Sydney | 4x400m relay |
CAC Junior Championships (U20)
| Silver medal – second place | 1994 Port of Spain | 800 m |
CAC Junior Championships (U17)
| Bronze medal – third place | 1990 Havana | 1200 m |
| Bronze medal – third place | 1990 Havana | 4x400 m relay |
CARIFTA Games Junior (U20)
| Gold medal – first place | 1993 Fort-de-France | 4x400m relay |
| Gold medal – first place | 1994 Bridgetown | 1500m |
| Silver medal – second place | 1993 Fort-de-France | 800m |
| Silver medal – second place | 1993 Fort-de-France | 1500m |
| Bronze medal – third place | 1994 Bridgetown | 800m |
CARIFTA Games Youth (U17)
| Silver medal – second place | 1990 Kingston | 800m |
| Silver medal – second place | 1990 Kingston | 1500m |
| Bronze medal – third place | 1991 Port of Spain | 400m |
| Bronze medal – third place | 1991 Port of Spain | 800m |

Charmaine L. Howell (born 13 March 1975) is a retired Jamaican athlete who specialized in the 800 metres.

== Career ==
She competed at the 2000 Olympics, being knocked out in the semi-final. She also ran for the Jamaican 4 x 400 metres relay team in the heats and could therefore receive an Olympic silver medal after Lorraine Graham, Deon Hemmings, Sandie Richards and Catherine Scott-Pomales finished second in the final.

Her personal best time over 800 metres was 1:59.61 minutes, achieved in June 2001 in Portland.

Since retiring, Charmaine has become a Financial Counselor and Zumba Instructor.

== Achievements ==
| Year | Competition | Venue | Position | Event | Notes |
Representing Jamaica
| 1990 | CARIFTA Games (U-17) | Kingston, Jamaica | 2nd | 800 m | 2:12.64 |
| 1990 | CARIFTA Games (U-17) | Kingston, Jamaica | 2nd | 1500 m | 4:46.86 |
| 1990 | Central American and Caribbean; Junior Championships (U-17) | Havana, Cuba | 4th | 800 m | 2:14.74 |
| 1990 | Central American and Caribbean; Junior Championships (U-17) | Havana, Cuba | 3rd | 1200 m | 3:37.69 |
| 1990 | Central American and Caribbean; Junior Championships (U-17) | Havana, Cuba | 3rd | 4x400 m relay | 3:54.57 |
| 1991 | CARIFTA Games (U-17) | Port of Spain, Trinidad and Tobago | 3rd | 400 m | 57.90 |
| 1991 | CARIFTA Games (U-17) | Port of Spain, Trinidad and Tobago | 3rd | 800 m | 2:13.80 |
| 1993 | CARIFTA Games (U-20) | Fort-de-France, Martinique | 2nd | 800 m | 2:11.94 |
| 1993 | CARIFTA Games (U-20) | Fort-de-France, Martinique | 2nd | 1500 m | 4:41.86 |
| 1993 | CARIFTA Games (U-20) | Fort-de-France, Martinique | 1st | 4x400 m relay | 3:35.76 |
| 1994 | CARIFTA Games (U-20) | Bridgetown, Barbados | 3rd | 800 m | 2:11.91 |
| 1994 | CARIFTA Games (U-20) | Bridgetown, Barbados | 1st | 1500 m | 4:44.46 |
| 1994 | Central American and Caribbean Junior; Championships (U-20) | Port of Spain, Trinidad and Tobago | 2nd | 800 m | 2:09.1 |
| 1994 | World Junior Championships | Lisbon, Portugal | 9th (h) | 4×400m relay | 3:39.58 |
| 1997 | Central American and Caribbean Championships | San Juan, Puerto Rico | 2nd | 4 × 400 m relay | 3:32.28 |
| 1998 | Central American and Caribbean Games | Maracaibo, Venezuela | 6th | 800 m | 2:09.69 |
| 1999 | Central American and Caribbean Championships | Bridgetown, Barbados | 1st | 800 m | 2:03.85 |
| 1999 | Central American and Caribbean Championships | Bridgetown, Barbados | 1st | 4x400 m relay | 3:30.00 |
| 1999 | Pan American Games | Winnipeg, Canada | 9th (h) | 800 m | 2:04.65 |
| 1999 | Pan American Games | Winnipeg, Canada | 4th | 4x400 m relay | 3:30.76 SB |
| 1999 | World Championships | Seville, Spain | 33rd (h) | 800 m | 2:04.73 |
| 1999 | World Championships | Seville, Spain | 7th (h) | 4x400 m relay | 3:27.78 SB |
| 2000 | Olympic Games | Sydney, Australia | 13th (sf) | 800 m | 2:00.63 |
| 2000 | Olympic Games | Sydney, Australia | 2nd | 4 x 400 m relay | 3:25.65 SB (h) |
| 2002 | Commonwealth Games | Manchester, United Kingdom | 13th (sf) | 800 m | 2:04.15 |
| 2002 | Commonwealth Games | Manchester, United Kingdom | 1st (h) | 4x400 m relay | 3:31.99 |
