= Victor Houston (athlete) =

Barbadian athlete

Personal information
- Born: February 24, 1974 (age 52)
Medal record
Men's Athletics
Representing Barbados
Central American and Caribbean Championships
Gold medal – first place	1999 Bridgetown	400m Hurdles
Silver medal – second place	1999 Bridgetown	110m Hurdles
CAC Junior Championships (U20)
Gold medal – first place	1992 Tegucigalpa	High jump
Silver medal – second place	1992 Tegucigalpa	Triple jump
Bronze medal – third place	1992 Tegucigalpa	Long jump
CAC Junior Championships (U17)
Gold medal – first place	1990 Havana	High jump
Silver medal – second place	1990 Havana	Triple jump
Bronze medal – third place	1990 Havana	Javelin throw
CARIFTA Games Junior (U20)
Gold medal – first place	1992 Nassau	High Jump
Gold medal – first place	1993 Fort-de-France	High Jump
Gold medal – first place	1993 Fort-de-France	Triple Jump
Silver medal – second place	1991 Port of Spain	High Jump
Silver medal – second place	1991 Port of Spain	Triple Jump
Silver medal – second place	1992 Nassau	Triple Jump
Silver medal – second place	1992 Nassau	4x100m relay
Bronze medal – third place	1993 Fort-de-France	Long Jump
Bronze medal – third place	1993 Fort-de-France	4x100m relay
Bronze medal – third place	1993 Fort-de-France	4x400m relay
CARIFTA Games Youth (U17)
Gold medal – first place	1989 Bridgetown	High Jump
Gold medal – first place	1990 Kingston	Triple Jump
Gold medal – first place	1990 Kingston	Javelin Throw
Silver medal – second place	1990 Kingston	High Jump
Silver medal – second place	1990 Kingston	Long Jump

Victor Emmanuel Livingstone Houston (born February 24, 1974) is a retired male track and field athlete from Barbados.

== Career ==
Competing for the Auburn Tigers track and field team, Houston won the 1996 NCAA Division I Outdoor Track and Field Championships in the decathlon.

He twice represented his native country at the Summer Olympics: 1996 and 2000. He competed in the men's decathlon and hurdling events during his career. Since 2011, Houston has been an assistant track and field coach at Texas Tech University.

== Achievements ==
Year	Competition	Venue	Position	Event	Notes
Representing Barbados
1989	CARIFTA Games (U-17)	Bridgetown, Barbados	1st	High jump	2.00 m
1990	CARIFTA Games (U-17)	Kingston, Jamaica	2nd	High jump	2.00 m
1990	CARIFTA Games (U-17)	Kingston, Jamaica	2nd	Long jump	7.04 m
1990	CARIFTA Games (U-17)	Kingston, Jamaica	1st	Triple jump	14.73 m
1990	CARIFTA Games (U-17)	Kingston, Jamaica	1st	Javelin throw	52.50 m
1990	Central American and Caribbean Junior Championships (U-17)	Havana, Cuba	1st	High jump	2.05 m
1990	Central American and Caribbean Junior Championships (U-17)	Havana, Cuba	4th	Long jump	6.87 m (0.1 m/s)
1990	Central American and Caribbean Junior Championships (U-17)	Havana, Cuba	2nd	Triple jump	14.90 m (0.0 m/s)
1990	Central American and Caribbean Junior Championships (U-17)	Havana, Cuba	3rd	Javelin throw	51.04 m
1991	CARIFTA Games (U-20)	Port of Spain, Trinidad and Tobago	2nd	High jump	2.05 m
1991	CARIFTA Games (U-20)	Port of Spain, Trinidad and Tobago	5th	Long jump	7.32 m
1991	CARIFTA Games (U-20)	Port of Spain, Trinidad and Tobago	2nd	Triple jump	15.17 m
1991	CARIFTA Games (U-20)	Port of Spain, Trinidad and Tobago	6th	Javelin throw	48.88 m
1992	CARIFTA Games (U-20)	Nassau, Bahamas	1st	High jump	2.08 m
1992	CARIFTA Games (U-20)	Nassau, Bahamas	4th	Long jump	7.26 m
1992	CARIFTA Games (U-20)	Nassau, Bahamas	2nd	Triple jump	15.12 m w
1992	CARIFTA Games (U-20)	Nassau, Bahamas	2nd	4 × 100 m	41.84
1992	Central American and Caribbean Junior Championships (U-20)	Tegucigalpa, Honduras	1st	High jump	2.08 m
1992	Central American and Caribbean Junior Championships (U-20)	Tegucigalpa, Honduras	3rd	Long jump	7.06 m
1992	Central American and Caribbean Junior Championships (U-20)	Tegucigalpa, Honduras	2nd	Triple jump	15.20 m
1993	CARIFTA Games (U-20)	Fort-de-France, Martinique	1st	High jump	2.10 m
1993	CARIFTA Games (U-20)	Fort-de-France, Martinique	3rd	Long jump	7.10 m
1993	CARIFTA Games (U-20)	Fort-de-France, Martinique	1st	Triple jump	15.68 m
1993	CARIFTA Games (U-20)	Fort-de-France, Martinique	3rd	4 × 100 m	42.47
1993	CARIFTA Games (U-20)	Fort-de-France, Martinique	3rd	4 × 400 m	3:19.72
1994	Commonwealth Games	Victoria, Canada	12th	Decathlon	6898 pts
1996	Olympic Games	Atlanta, United States	–	Decathlon	DNF
1997	World Championships	Athens, Greece	17th	Decathlon	7777 pts
1998	Central American and Caribbean Games	Maracaibo, Venezuela	4th	400 m H	50.05
1998	Commonwealth Games	Kuala Lumpur, Malaysia	5th	400 m H	49.21
1998	Commonwealth Games	Kuala Lumpur, Malaysia	9th (h)	4 × 400 m	40.16
1999	Central American and Caribbean Championships	Bridgetown, Barbados	2nd	110 m H	13.71
1999	Central American and Caribbean Championships	Bridgetown, Barbados	1st	4 × 100 m	39.75
1999	Pan American Games	Winnipeg, Canada	10th (h)	400 m H	50.73
1999	World Championships	Seville, Spain	37th (h)	110 m H	13.86 (-0.3 m/s)
1999	World Championships	Seville, Spain	38th (h)	400 m H	50.57
2000	Olympic Games	Sydney, Australia	32nd (h)	110 m H	14.06 (-0.6 m/s)
2000	Olympic Games	Sydney, Australia	49th (h)	400 m H	51.51
