= Inez Turner =

Jamaican athletics competitor

Personal information
- Born: 3 January 1972 (age 54) Trelawny Parish, Jamaica
Medal record
Women's athletics
Representing Jamaica
World Championships
Bronze medal – third place	1997 Athens	4x400 m relay
Summer Universiade
Silver medal – second place	1993 Buffalo	800 m
Commonwealth Games
Gold medal – first place	1994 Victoria	800m
CAC Junior Championships (U20)
Gold medal – first place	1990 Havana	800 m
Silver medal – second place	1990 Havana	400 m
Silver medal – second place	1990 Havana	4x400 m relay
CARIFTA Games Junior (U20)
Gold medal – first place	1989 Bridgetown	400m
Gold medal – first place	1989 Bridgetown	800m
Gold medal – first place	1990 Kingston	800m
Gold medal – first place	1990 Kingston	4x400m relay
Gold medal – first place	1991 Port of Spain	400m
Gold medal – first place	1991 Port of Spain	800m
Silver medal – second place	1990 Kingston	400m
CARIFTA Games (Under 17s)
Gold medal – first place	1988 Kingston	800m
Silver medal – second place	1988 Kingston	400m

Inez Turner (born 3 January 1972) is a retired female sprinter and middle-distance runner from Jamaica.

== Career ==
Turner competed for the Barton Cougars track and field team in the NJCAA and then transferred to the Texas State Bobcats track and field team, where she competed in the NCAA.

In 1991 she was awarded the Austin Sealy Trophy for the most outstanding athlete of the 1991 CARIFTA Games. She won the 800m gold at the 1994 Commonwealth Games. Together with Lorraine Fenton, Deon Hemmings and Sandie Richards she claimed a bronze medal in the women's 4 x 400 metres relay at the 1997 World Championships in Athletics.

== Personal bests ==
- 400 meters - 51.38 (1993)
- 800 meters - 1:59.49 (1995)

== International competitions ==
Year	Competition	Venue	Position	Event	Notes
Representing Jamaica
1988	CARIFTA Games (U-17)	Kingston, Jamaica	2nd	400 m	54.86
1988	CARIFTA Games (U-17)	Kingston, Jamaica	1st	800 m	2:10.00
1989	CARIFTA Games (U-20)	Bridgetown, Barbados	1st	400 m	52.7
1989	CARIFTA Games (U-20)	Bridgetown, Barbados	1st	800 m	2:07.6
1990	CARIFTA Games (U-20)	Kingston, Jamaica	2nd	400 m	54.79
1990	CARIFTA Games (U-20)	Kingston, Jamaica	1st	800 m	2:10.58
1990	CARIFTA Games (U-20)	Kingston, Jamaica	1st	4 × 400 m relay	3:38.28
1990	Central American and Caribbean; Junior Championships (U-20)	Havana, Cuba	2nd	400 m	53.91
1990	Central American and Caribbean; Junior Championships (U-20)	Havana, Cuba	1st	800 m	2:09.16
1990	Central American and Caribbean; Junior Championships (U-20)	Havana, Cuba	2nd	4 × 400 m relay	3:38.07
1990	World Junior Championships	Plovdiv, Bulgaria	3rd (h)	800m	2:06.69
1990	World Junior Championships	Plovdiv, Bulgaria	2nd	4 × 400 m relay	3:31.09
1991	CARIFTA Games (U-20)	Port of Spain, Trinidad and Tobago	1st	400 m	53.80
1991	CARIFTA Games (U-20)	Port of Spain, Trinidad and Tobago	1st	800 m	2:08.36
1991	Pan American Junior Championships	Kingston, Jamaica	1st	800 m	2:04.57
1991	Pan American Junior Championships	Kingston, Jamaica	1st	4 × 400 m relay	3:33.13
1991	Pan American Games	Havana, Cuba	5th	800 m	2:02.68
1991	Pan American Games	Havana, Cuba	3rd	4 × 400 m relay	3:28.33
1993	Universiade	Buffalo, United States	2nd	800 m	2:04.14
1993	Central American and Caribbean Championships	Cali, Colombia	3rd	800 m	52.64
1993	World Championships	Stuttgart, Germany	11th (sf)	400 m	52.25
1993	World Championships	Stuttgart, Germany	4th	4 × 400 m relay	3:23.83
1994	Commonwealth Games	Victoria, Canada	1st	800 m	2:01.74
1994	Commonwealth Games	Victoria, Canada	2nd	4 × 400 m relay	3:28.63
1995	World Indoor Championships	Barcelona, Spain	6th	800 m	2:02.00
1995	World Championships	Gothenburg, Sweden	–	800 m	DQ
1996	Olympic Games	Atlanta, United States	21st (h)	800 m	2:01.48
1996	Olympic Games	Atlanta, United States	6th (h)	4 × 400 m relay	3:25.33
1997	World Indoor Championships	Paris, France	9th (sf)	800 m	2:03.51
1997	World Championships	Athens, Greece	28th (h)	400 m	53.34
1997	World Championships	Athens, Greece	3rd	4 × 400 m relay	3:21.30 NR
