= Alex Morgan (runner) =

Jamaican athlete

Personal information
- Nationality: Jamaican
- Born: 27 December 1972 (age 53)

Sport
- Sport: Middle-distance running
- Event: 800 metres

Alex Morgan (born 27 December 1972) is a retired Jamaican middle-distance runner. He competed in the men's 800 metres at the 1996 Summer Olympics.

Morgan competed for the George Mason Patriots track and field team in the NCAA.
