= Andria Lloyd =

Jamaican sprinter (born 1971)

Medal record

Women's athletics

Representing Jamaica

Olympic Games
Bronze medal – third place	1996 Atlanta	4x100m relay

CARIFTA Games Junior (U20)
Silver medal – second place	1989 Bridgetown	100m
Bronze medal – third place	1989 Bridgetown	200m

CARIFTA Games Youth (U17)
Silver medal – second place	1987 Port of Spain	100m
Silver medal – second place	1987 Port of Spain	200m

Andria Lloyd (born 10 August 1971 in Rastatt, West Germany) participated in the 1996 Summer Olympics. She received a bronze medal, competing for Jamaica in the 4 × 100 m relay.

Lloyd attended high school in Camperdown. She attended college at the University of Alabama, where she was an All-American sprinter. Her personal best is 11.36 seconds in the 100 m, which came in 1996.
