= Rudolph Mighty =

Jamaican sprinter (born 1972)

Personal information
- Nationality: Jamaican
- Born: 25 November 1972 (age 53)

Sport
- Sport: Sprinting
- Event: 4 × 100 metres relay

Rudolph Mighty (born 25 November 1972) is a Jamaican sprinter. He competed in the men's 4 × 100 metres relay at the 1992 Summer Olympics.
