= Terrence McCrea =

Jamaican hurdler (born 1971)

Terrence McCrea (born 31 December 1971) is a retired Jamaican hurdler.
