= Percival Spencer (sprinter) =

Jamaican sprinter (born 1975)

Personal information
- Nationality: Jamaica
- Born: 24 February 1975 (age 51)

Sport
- Sport: Running
- Event(s): 100 metres, 200 metres

Achievements and titles
- Olympic finals: 1996 Summer Olympics
- Personal best(s): 100 m: 9.98 s (Kingston 1997); 200 m: 20.20 s (Nassau 1999)

Percival Spencer (born 24 February 1975) is a former Jamaican sprinter, who specialised in the 100 and 200 meters. He was the 1997 Jamaica National Champion in the 100 m.

He spent his collegiate career at Texas Christian University. He won the 100 and 200 metres at the 1997 Western Athletic Conference track and field championships.

Spencer participated in the 1996 Summer Olympics, and 1997 World Championships in Athletics.

== Personal best ==
| Distance | Time | venue |
|---|---|---|
| 100 m | 9.98 s | Kingston, Jamaica (20 June 1997) |
| 200 m | 20.44 s | Nassau, The Bahamas (26 May 1999) |
