= Claudine Williams =

Jamaican sprinter

Personal information
- Nationality: Jamaican
- Born: 8 January 1976 (age 50) Kingston, Jamaica

Sport
- Sport: Sprinting
- Event: 400 metres
Medal record
Representing Jamaica
Pan American Games
Bronze medal – third place	1999 Winnipeg	400m
Central American and Caribbean Games
Bronze medal – third place	1993 Ponce	4x100m relay

Claudine Venice Williams (born 8 January 1976) is a Jamaican sprinter. She competed in the women's 400 metres at the 1992 Summer Olympics.

Running as a foreign national, Williams won the 1991 Japan Championships in Athletics in the 400 metres in a time of 52.70 seconds.

Competing for the LSU Lady Tigers track and field team, Williams won the 1999 NCAA Division I Outdoor Track and Field Championships in the 800 m.
