= Marsha Mark-Baird =

Trinidadian heptathlete (born 1974)

Personal information
- Full name: Marsha Mark-Baird
- Nationality: Trinidad and Tobago
- Born: 20 January 1974 (age 52) Point Fortin, Trinidad and Tobago
- Height: 1.70 m (5 ft 7 in)
- Weight: 60 kg (132 lb)

Sport
- Sport: Athletics
- Event: Heptathlon
- College team: BYU Cougars
- Coached by: Craig Poole

Achievements and titles
- Personal bests: Heptathlon: 5962 points (2004)
Medal record
Women's athletics
Representing Trinidad and Tobago
Central American and Caribbean Games
Silver medal – second place	1998 Maracaibo	Heptathlon

Marsha Mark-Baird (born January 20, 1974, in Point Fortin) is a track and field athlete from Trinidad and Tobago, specializing in the heptathlon. She represented her nation Trinidad and Tobago in two editions of the Olympic Games (2000 and 2004), finishing twenty-second in Sydney and twenty-fifth in Athens with a then national record and her personal best score of 5962 points. Leading up to her Olympic career, Mark-Baird also picked up a silver medal in heptathlon at the 1998 Central American and Caribbean Games in Maracaibo, Venezuela.

== Career ==
A convert to the Church of Jesus Christ of Latter-day Saints, Mark-Baird started competing in the heptathlon upon her admission to Ricks College in 1993. Two years later, she transferred to Brigham Young University in Provo, Utah, on a sports scholarship, training as a member of the BYU Cougars track and field squad under the tutelage of head coach Craig Poole. While competing for the Cougars, Mark-Baird placed ninth in the heptathlon at the outdoor NCAA Championships and had contributed to a stalwart, runner-up finish for the women's track and field team at the Western Athletic Conference in San Diego, California, on her junior year.

After graduating from BYU with a master's degree in social work, Mark-Baird emerged herself to be part of the world elite in heptathlon. Her first major global outing came at the 1998 Central American and Caribbean Games in Maracaibo, Venezuela, where she attained a personal record of 5706 points to take home the silver medal for Trinidad and Tobago.

=== Olympic Games ===
On her Olympic debut in Sydney 2000, Mark-Baird became the first ever athlete from Trinidad and Tobago to compete in the heptathlon, finishing in twenty-second with 5627 points.

At the 2004 Summer Olympics in Athens, Mark-Baird qualified for her second Trinidad and Tobago team in the women's heptathlon. Leading up to her second Games, she improved her personal best score to 5934 at the track and field meeting in California during her 2004 season, that got her past the IAAF Olympic "B" standard. Mark-Baird put up a startling effort in the javelin throw to accumulate a Trinidad and Tobago record total of 5962 points, but slipped to twenty-fifth overall from her position in Sydney four years earlier.

=== Retirement and comeback ===
After the 2004 season, Mark-Baird announced her retirement from the sport to focus on both her personal life and social work endeavors. Upon watching U.S. swimmer Dara Torres and fellow sportsman and table tennis player Dexter St. Louis compete at the age of 41 in Beijing 2008, Mark-Baird sought her sights of planning an Olympic comeback. In early 2015, she began to train and compete again in heptathlon for the 2016 Summer Olympics in Rio de Janeiro.

=== Masters ===
In August 2015, Mark-Baird competed in her first World Masters Championships in Lyon, France. She earned individual gold in the W40 heptathlon and long jump, and anchored the victorious women's over-35 4 × 100 m relay with Ayanna Hutchinson, Dawnelle Stafford and Sasha Springer.

== Personal life ==
Mark-Baird currently resides in Provo, Utah, with her husband and personal manager Gregory Baird, and three of their sons, Mark, Ty, and London (whose name was linked to her Olympic comeback plans). Since her admission to college in 1993, Mark-Baird continues to serve full-time as a member of the Church of Jesus Christ of Latter-day Saints.

== Personal bests ==
Event	Best	Venue	Year	Notes
100 meter hurdles	13.58s	Athens, Greece	August 20, 2004	
High jump	1.71 m	La Salle, Colorado, United States	August 7, 2000	
Shot put	11.44 m	Athens, Greece	August 20, 2004	
200 meters	25.11 s	Athens, Greece	August 21, 2004	
Long jump	6.44 m	Provo, Utah, United States	April 2, 2004	
Javelin throw	49.90 m	Athens, Greece	August 21, 2004	
800 meters	2:21.21	Athens, Greece	August 21, 2004	
Heptathlon	5,962 points	Athens, Greece	August 21, 2004	

- All information taken from IAAF profile.
