= Catherine Scott (athlete) =

Jamaican athletics competitor

Medal record

Women's athletics

Representing Jamaica

Olympic Games
Silver medal – second place	2000 Sydney	4 × 400 m Relay

World Championships
Gold medal – first place	2001 Edmonton	4 × 400 m relay

World Indoor Championships
Silver medal – second place	2001 Lisbon	4 × 400 m

CARIFTA Games Junior (U20)
Gold medal – first place	1990 Kingston	400 m
Gold medal – first place	1990 Kingston	4 × 100 m relay
Gold medal – first place	1990 Kingston	4 × 400 m relay

CARIFTA Games Youth (U17)
Gold medal – first place	1989 Bridgetown	100 m
Gold medal – first place	1989 Bridgetown	400 m
Bronze medal – third place	1987 Port of Spain	400 m

Catherine Scott (born 27 August 1973 in Clarendon Parish) is a retired Jamaican athlete who specialized in the 400 metres hurdles. She also competed on the successful Jamaican team in the 4 × 400 metres relay, winning an Olympic silver medal in 2000. she is the sister of Michael Blackwood.

== Achievements ==
Year	Competition	Venue	Position	Event	Notes
Representing Jamaica
1990	World Junior Championships	Plovdiv, Bulgaria	7th (sf)	400 m	53.46
1990	World Junior Championships	Plovdiv, Bulgaria	2nd	4 × 400 m relay	3:31.09
1991	Central American and Caribbean Championships	Xalapa, Mexico	2nd	400 m	53.39 A
1991	Central American and Caribbean Championships	Xalapa, Mexico	1st	4 × 400 m relay	3:38.18
1992	World Junior Championships	Seoul, South Korea	8th (sf)	400 m	53.91
1992	World Junior Championships	Seoul, South Korea	2nd	4 × 400 m relay	3:32.68
2000	Olympic Games	Sydney, Australia	2nd	4 × 400 m	3:23.25
2001	World Indoor Championships	Lisbon, Portugal	2nd	4 × 400 m	3:30.79
2001	World Championships	Edmonton, Canada	1st	4 × 400 m	3:20.65
2003	World Indoor Championships	Birmingham, England	2nd	4 × 400 m	3:31.23

=== Personal bests ===
- 400 metres – 51.65 s (2000)
- 400 metres hurdles – 54.93 s (2000)
