= Leon Gordon (athlete) =

Jamaican sprinter

Personal information
- Born: 1 July 1974 (age 51)

Sport
- Sport: Athletics

Leon Gordon (also spelled Leion Gordon; born 1 July 1974) is a former Jamaican sprinter who competed in the men's 100m competition at the 1996 Summer Olympics. He recorded a 10.48, not enough to qualify for the next round past the heats. His personal best is 10.19, set in 1996. He was also on the 1996 Jamaican men's 4 × 100 m relay team, which won its heat, and was subsequently disqualified in the semifinal round.

Gordon competed for the Texas Tech Red Raiders track and field team in the NCAA.
