= Diane Guthrie-Gresham =

Jamaican athlete (born 1971)

Personal information
- Born: October 24, 1971 (age 54) Saint Elizabeth Parish, Jamaica

Sport
- Sport: Track and field
Medal record
Representing Jamaica
Pan American Games
Gold medal – first place	1991 Havana	Long jump

Diane Claire Guthrie-Gresham (born 24 October 1971) is a retired female track and field athlete from Jamaica, who specialized in the long jump and heptathlon during her career.

Diane holds the National Collegiate Athletics Association championship meet record for women's Heptathlon, as well as the Caribbean record for that event. Competing for George Mason University, she compiled a total of 6527 at the University of Tennessee's Tom Black Track in Knoxville, Tennessee, between 2–3 June 1995. She won her second NCAA title with that mark, and also broke Jackie Joyner-Kersee's NCAA meet record. Joyner-Kersee had set the record of 6390 points in Houston in 1983 when she was competing for UCLA, by 137 points.

Lifetime best: 6527(13.86w, 1.86/6-1¼, 13.80/45-3½, 24.91 [3728], 6.92/22-8½w), 49.04/160-11, 2:20.82 [2799])

== College ==
She was born in Saint Elizabeth Parish, Jamaica. While at George Mason University, she won the Broderick Award (now the Honda Sports Award) as the nation's best female collegiate track and field competitor in 1995.

== Achievements ==
Year	Competition	Venue	Position	Event	Notes
Representing Jamaica
1991	Pan American Games	Havana, Cuba	1st	Long jump	6.64 m
1992	Olympic Games	Barcelona, Spain	—	Long jump	NM
1996	Olympic Games	Atlanta, United States	16th	Heptathlon	6087
