= 2002 NACAC Under-25 Championships in Athletics – Results =

These are the full results of the 2002 NACAC Under-25 Championships in Athletics which took place between August 9 and August 11, 2002, at E.M. Stevens Stadium in San Antonio, Texas, United States.

== Men's results ==
=== 100 meters ===
Final
Wind: +0.3 m/s

Rank	Name	Nationality	Time	Notes
1st place, gold medalist(s)	Jason Smoots	United States	10.22	
2nd place, silver medalist(s)	Tom Green	United States	10.45	
3rd place, bronze medalist(s)	Rhoan Sterling	Canada	10.47	
4	Lerone Clarke	Jamaica	10.50	
5	Joel Báez	Dominican Republic	10.53	
6	Bob Colville	Costa Rica	10.63	
7	Winston Smith	Jamaica	10.67	
8	Juan Encarnación	Dominican Republic	10.70	

Heat 1
Wind: +1.2 m/s

Rank	Name	Nationality	Time	Notes
1	Rhoan Sterling	Canada	10.55	Q
2	Bob Colville	Costa Rica	10.56	Q
3	Leonardo Matos	Dominican Republic	10.74	
4	Jamial Rolle	Bahamas	10.76	
5	Julio Felix	U.S. Virgin Islands	10.83	
6	Jason Gill	Barbados	10.91	
7	Irvin Browne	Saint Kitts and Nevis	11.03	

Heat 2
Wind: +0.9 m/s

Rank	Name	Nationality	Time	Notes
1	Lerone Clarke	Jamaica	10.54	Q
2	Tom Green	United States	10.59	Q
3	Juan Encarnación	Dominican Republic	10.62	q
4	Azik Graham	Saint Vincent and the Grenadines	10.92	
5	Nathan Justin	Saint Lucia	11.03	
6	Jonnie Eduar Lowe	Honduras	11.07	
7	Denis Gutiérrez	Nicaragua	11.13	

Heat 3
Wind: +0.9 m/s

Rank	Name	Nationality	Time	Notes
1	Jason Smoots	United States	10.28	Q
2	Joel Báez	Dominican Republic	10.51	Q
3	Winston Smith	Jamaica	10.71	q
4	Kevin Bartlett	Barbados	10.73	
5	Clement Taylor	Bahamas	10.75	
6	Ralston Henry	British Virgin Islands	11.38	

=== 200 meters ===
Final
Wind: +0.5 m/s

Rank	Name	Nationality	Time	Notes
1st place, gold medalist(s)	Dominic Demeritte	Bahamas	20.60	
2nd place, silver medalist(s)	Ryan Olkowski	United States	20.91	
3rd place, bronze medalist(s)	Ainsley Waugh	Jamaica	21.04	
4	Jamial Rolle	Bahamas	21.06	
5	Rhoan Sterling	Canada	21.09	
6	Luis Céspedes	Dominican Republic	21.19	
7	Joseph Colville	Costa Rica	21.44	

Heat 1
Wind: +1.6 m/s

Rank	Name	Nationality	Time	Notes
1	Ainsley Waugh	Jamaica	20.96	Q
2	Rhoan Sterling	Canada	21.05	Q
3	Jamial Rolle	Bahamas	21.06	q
4	Osvaldo Nieves	Puerto Rico	21.49	
5	Juan Sainfleur	Dominican Republic	21.56	
6	Derrick Johnson	United States	21.97	
7	Nathan Justin	Saint Lucia	22.25	

Heat 2
Wind: +1.2 m/s

Rank	Name	Nationality	Time	Notes
1	Dominic Demeritte	Bahamas	20.90	Q
2	Ryan Olkowski	United States	21.00	Q
3	Sherwin James	Dominica	21.42	
4	Hugh Reid	Barbados	21.83	
5	Kenneth Telemaque	U.S. Virgin Islands	22.19	
6	Azik Graham	Saint Vincent and the Grenadines	22.75	

Heat 3
Wind: +0.9 m/s

Rank	Name	Nationality	Time	Notes
1	Joseph Colville	Costa Rica	21.24	Q
2	Winston Smith	Jamaica	21.25	Q
3	Luis Céspedes	Dominican Republic	21.29	q
4	Julio Felix	U.S. Virgin Islands	21.83	
5	Irvin Browne	Saint Kitts and Nevis	22.19	
6	Jonnie Eduar Lowe	Honduras	22.44	
7	Óscar Silva	Nicaragua	22.93	

=== 400 meters ===
Final

Rank	Name	Nationality	Time	Notes
1st place, gold medalist(s)	Christopher Brown	Bahamas	45.50	
2nd place, silver medalist(s)	Godfrey Herring	United States	45.65	
3rd place, bronze medalist(s)	William Kenyon	United States	45.76	
4	Carlos Yohelin Santa	Dominican Republic	45.77	
5	Richard James	Jamaica	47.00	
6	Lanceford Spence	Jamaica	47.06	
7	Chris Lloyd	Dominica	47.48	
8	Geronimo Goeloe	Netherlands Antilles	47.55	

Heat 1

Rank	Name	Nationality	Time	Notes
1	William Kenyon	United States	46.69	Q
2	Richard James	Jamaica	46.93	Q
3	Nigel Leonce	Saint Lucia	49.06	
	Jonnie Eduar Lowe	Honduras	DNF	

Heat 2

Rank	Name	Nationality	Time	Notes
1	Carlos Yohelin Santa	Dominican Republic	46.05	Q
2	Geronimo Goeloe	Netherlands Antilles	47.74	Q
3	Arismendy Peguero	Dominican Republic	47.75	
4	Kenneth Telemaque	U.S. Virgin Islands	48.72	
5	Charles Micha	Dominica	48.85	

Heat 3

Rank	Name	Nationality	Time	Notes
1	Lanceford Spence	Jamaica	45.93	Q
2	Christopher Brown	Bahamas	46.19	Q
3	Godfrey Herring	United States	46.20	q
4	Chris Lloyd	Dominica	47.03	q
5	Hugh Reid	Barbados	47.57	
6	Fabian Felix	Saint Lucia	48.71	

=== 800 meters ===
Final

Rank	Name	Nationality	Time	Notes
1st place, gold medalist(s)	Achraf Tadili	Canada	1:48.19	
2nd place, silver medalist(s)	Luis Soto	Puerto Rico	1:48.41	
3rd place, bronze medalist(s)	Elliott Blount	United States	1:48.55	
4	Heleodoro Navarro	Mexico	1:49.33	
5	Moise Joseph	United States	1:49.62	
6	Aldwyn Sappleton	Jamaica	1:49.98	
7	Alexius Roberts	Bahamas	1:50.91	
8	Nickie Peters	Saint Vincent and the Grenadines	1:53.10	

Heat 1

Rank	Name	Nationality	Time	Notes
1	Moise Joseph	United States	1:50.34	Q
2	Aldwyn Sappleton	Jamaica	1:50.69	Q
3	Luis Soto	Puerto Rico	1:50.76	Q
4	Nigel Leonce	Saint Lucia	1:52.16	
5	Kenneth Otarola	Costa Rica	1:53.07	
6	Clive Baron	Dominica	1:58.39	

Heat 2

Rank	Name	Nationality	Time	Notes
1	Elliott Blount	United States	1:51.03	Q
2	Achraf Tadili	Canada	1:51.11	Q
3	Nickie Peters	Saint Vincent and the Grenadines	1:51.35	Q
4	Heleodoro Navarro	Mexico	1:51.42	q
5	Alexius Roberts	Bahamas	1:51.62	q
6	César Arias	El Salvador	1:55.41	
7	Damian Simmons	Bermuda	1:56.99	

=== 1500 meters ===
Final

Rank	Name	Nationality	Time	Notes
1st place, gold medalist(s)	Ryan McKenzie	Canada	3:51.31	
2nd place, silver medalist(s)	Dan Wilson	United States	3:51.64	
3rd place, bronze medalist(s)	Heleodoro Navarro	Mexico	3:52.10	
4	Hunter Spencer	United States	3:53.91	
5	Kenneth Otarola	Costa Rica	3:55.99	
6	Omar Chavarría	Mexico	3:57.58	

=== 5000 meters ===
Final

Rank	Name	Nationality	Time	Notes
1st place, gold medalist(s)	Reid Coolsaet	Canada	14:44.46	
2nd place, silver medalist(s)	Jonnathan Morales	Mexico	14:45.16	
3rd place, bronze medalist(s)	Karl Savage	United States	14:48.35	
4	Jeffrey Pérez	Costa Rica	14:49.19	
5	Sergio de León Solis	Guatemala	15:00.17	

=== 10,000 meters ===
Final

Rank	Name	Nationality	Time	Notes
1st place, gold medalist(s)	Jonnathan Morales	Mexico	30:16.26	
2nd place, silver medalist(s)	Brian Sell	United States	30:16.29	
3rd place, bronze medalist(s)	James Carney	United States	30:48.28	
4	Edher Cortés	Mexico	32:56.17	
5	Nathan Kendrick	Canada	33:25.05	

=== Half marathon ===
Final

Rank	Name	Nationality	Time	Notes
1st place, gold medalist(s)	Michael Wisniewski	United States	1:10:05.00	

=== 3000 meters steeplechase ===
Final

Rank	Name	Nationality	Time	Notes
1st place, gold medalist(s)	Jordan Desilets	United States	8:52.10	
2nd place, silver medalist(s)	Ian Collings	Canada	8:59.73	
3rd place, bronze medalist(s)	Luke Watson	United States	9:19.39	
4	Rubén Tripp	Mexico	9:46.48	

=== 110 meters hurdles ===
Final
Wind: +1.3 m/s

Rank	Name	Nationality	Time	Notes
1st place, gold medalist(s)	Terrence Trammell	United States	13.45	
2nd place, silver medalist(s)	Ron Bramlett	United States	13.53	
3rd place, bronze medalist(s)	Jared MacLeod	Canada	13.80	
4	Hugh Henry	Barbados	14.20	
5	Robert Charbonneau	Canada	14.32	
6	Emmanuel Daux	Haiti	14.46	
7	Roberto Carbajal	Mexico	14.96	
8	José Calixto Sierra	Honduras	17.25	

=== 400 meters hurdles ===
Final

Rank	Name	Nationality	Time	Notes
1st place, gold medalist(s)	James Carter	United States	48.95	
2nd place, silver medalist(s)	Fred Sharpe	United States	49.73	
3rd place, bronze medalist(s)	Dean Griffiths	Jamaica	50.06	
4	Adam Kunkel	Canada	50.22	
5	Ednal Rolle	Bahamas	51.55	
6	Roberto Carbajal	Mexico	51.80	
7	Israel Benítez	Mexico	51.86	
8	Roberto Cortés	El Salvador	54.25	

Heat 1

Rank	Name	Nationality	Time	Notes
1	Dean Griffiths	Jamaica	51.22	Q
2	James Carter	United States	51.55	Q
3	Israel Benítez	Mexico	52.03	Q
4	Roberto Carbajal	Mexico	52.96	q
5	José Calixto Sierra	Honduras	59.15	

Heat 2

Rank	Name	Nationality	Time	Notes
1	Fred Sharpe	United States	52.18	Q
2	Adam Kunkel	Canada	52.78	Q
3	Ednal Rolle	Bahamas	52.82	Q
4	Roberto Cortés	El Salvador	53.57	q

=== High jump ===
Final

Rank	Name	Nationality	Attempts						Result	Notes
Rank	Name	Nationality	2.00	2.05	2.10	2.15	2.18	2.21	Result	Notes
1st place, gold medalist(s)	Romael Lightbourne	Bahamas	-	xo	xo	xo	o	xxx	2.18m	
2nd place, silver medalist(s)	Terrance Woods	United States	-	-	o	o	xo	xxx	2.18m	
3rd place, bronze medalist(s)	Jaswinder Gill	Canada	-	o	o	o	xxx		2.15m	
3rd place, bronze medalist(s)	Mike Kizinkewich	Canada	o	o	o	o	xxx		2.15m	
5	Henderson Pottin	Barbados	-	-	xo	o	xxx		2.15m	
6	Matt Vicent	United States	-	o	o	xxo	xxx		2.15m	
7	Craig Norman	Jamaica	-	xo	-	xxo	xxx		2.15m	
8	Huguens Jean	Haiti	-	o	xxo	xxx			2.10m	
9	Gerardo Martínez	Mexico	xo	xo	xxx				2.05m	
10	Tulio Quiroz	Honduras	xxo	xxx					2.00m	

=== Pole vault ===
Final

Rank	Name	Nationality	Attempts													Result	Notes
Rank	Name	Nationality	4.15	4.30	4.45	4.60	4.75	4.90	5.00	5.10	5.30	5.45	5.55	5.60	5.80	Result	Notes
1st place, gold medalist(s)	Jeremy Scott	United States	-	-	-	-	-	-	-	xxo	o	xxo	o	xx-	x	5.55m	
2nd place, silver medalist(s)	Brad Walker	United States	-	-	-	-	-	o	xxo	xo	xo	xxx				5.30m	
3rd place, bronze medalist(s)	Ricardo Pallares	Mexico	-	-	-	o	o	o	xxo	xxx						5.00m	
4	César Nava	Mexico	-	-	-	-	o	xo	xxx							4.90m	
5	Jorge Solórzano	Guatemala	xo	xxo	xxx											4.30m	
	Simon Bélanger	Canada	-	-	-	xxx										NH	
	Óscar Hernández	El Salvador	-	xxx												NH	

=== Long jump ===
Final

Rank	Name	Nationality	Attempts						Result	Notes
Rank	Name	Nationality	1	2	3	4	5	6	Result	Notes
1st place, gold medalist(s)	Osbourne Moxey	Bahamas	7.58m (-0.4)	x (-1.1)	7.76m (-0.1)	8.04m (0.3)	x (0.5)	8.19m (0.8)	8.19m (+0.8 m/s)	
2nd place, silver medalist(s)	William Montgomery	United States	7.19m (-0.1)	x (-0.2)	7.33m (0.7)	7.90m (1.5)	7.84m (1.1)	7.76m (0.7)	7.90m (+1.5 m/s)	
3rd place, bronze medalist(s)	LeJuan Simon	United States	7.46m (-0.6)	7.78m (-0.7)	7.45m (0.7)	6.62m (0.4)	7.75m (1.9)	x (1.2)	7.78m (-0.7 m/s)	
4	Kevin Bartlett	Barbados	x (-0.1)	5.58m (-2.0)	7.14m (1.8)	7.38m (1.2)	x (-1.5)	7.51m (1.3)	7.51m (+1.3 m/s)	
5	Sherwin James	Dominica	7.20m (-0.1)	6.86m (-0.1)	7.23m w (2.2)	7.27m (0.5)	x (1.1)	x (1.1)	7.27m (+0.5 m/s)	
5	Jean Cummings	Saint Vincent and the Grenadines	x (0.1)	x (-3.2)	7.02m (1.4)	6.86m (0.8)	7.27m (1.6)	7.08m (0.7)	7.27m (+1.6 m/s)	
7	Carlos Nieves	Puerto Rico	7.01m (-0.5)	x (-0.0)	7.22m (0.1)	x (1.2)	x w (3.1)	7.18m (1.6)	7.22m (+0.1 m/s)	
8	Alberto Rodas	Canada	6.92m (0.1)	7.13m (0.1)	6.91m (1.5)	x w (2.7)	6.98m w (2.3)	7.19m (0.2)	7.19m (+0.2 m/s)	
9	Ralston Henry	British Virgin Islands	6.85m (-0.1)	6.77m (-0.3)	6.75m (1.8)				6.85m (-0.1 m/s)	
10	Juan Mota	Dominican Republic	x (-0.1)	6.81m (-0.1)	x (0.9)				6.81m (-0.1 m/s)	
11	Iván Soberanis	Mexico	6.13m (-0.5)	6.50m (0.6)	x w (3.0)				6.50m (+0.6 m/s)	

=== Triple jump ===
Final

Rank	Name	Nationality	Attempts						Result	Notes
Rank	Name	Nationality	1	2	3	4	5	6	Result	Notes
1st place, gold medalist(s)	Leevan Sands	Bahamas	15.79m (-1.0)	16.10m (-0.1)	16.72m (-1.3)	-	-	x (0.2)	16.72m (-1.3 m/s)	
2nd place, silver medalist(s)	Greg Yeldell	United States	16.23m (-0.5)	16.61m (-0.9)	x (-0.9)	16.20m (-0.2)	x (1.4)	x (-1.7)	16.61m (-0.9 m/s)	
3rd place, bronze medalist(s)	Quincy Howe	Trinidad and Tobago	15.30m (-0.4)	x (0.6)	x (-1.8)	15.18m (-0.6)	15.43m (-1.4)	15.72m (-0.9)	15.72m (-0.9 m/s)	
4	LeJuan Simon	United States	15.43m (-0.5)	15.57m (-0.9)	15.42m (-0.9)	x (-0.4)	x (-0.5)	14.91m (-1.1)	15.57m (-0.9 m/s)	
5	Gerardo Carrasco	Mexico	x (0.0)	14.81m (0.2)	14.97m (-1.1)	x (-0.1)	15.32m (-0.4)	15.42m (-0.8)	15.42m (-0.8 m/s)	
6	Antonio Saunders	Bahamas	14.69m (-1.1)	14.85m (0.3)	x (-0.4)	x (-1.4)	14.93m (-0.2)	15.29m (0.9)	15.29m (+0.9 m/s)	
7	Shawn Peters	Canada	14.94m (-0.3)	14.93m (-0.3)	x (-1.9)	14.95m (-0.2)	14.73m (0.4)	14.61m (-1.2)	14.95m (-0.2 m/s)	

=== Shot put ===
Final

Rank	Name	Nationality	Attempts						Result	Notes
Rank	Name	Nationality	1	2	3	4	5	6	Result	Notes
1st place, gold medalist(s)	Jon Kalnas	United States	17.50m	18.20m	x	17.98m	17.83m	18.70m	18.70m	
2nd place, silver medalist(s)	Chris Adams	United States	17.67m	17.70m	17.64m	x	x	17.10m	17.70m	
3rd place, bronze medalist(s)	Dave Stoute	Trinidad and Tobago	17.45m	17.65m	x	17.53m	x	17.66m	17.66m	
4	Paulino Ríos	Mexico	14.20m	x	14.83m	15.07m	x	15.16m	15.16m	
5	Akim Herbert	Saint Lucia	12.92m	x	x	x	x	12.84m	12.92m	

=== Discus throw ===
Final

Rank	Name	Nationality	Attempts						Result	Notes
Rank	Name	Nationality	1	2	3	4	5	6	Result	Notes
1st place, gold medalist(s)	Jason Young	United States	x	48.18m	52.74m	55.74m	53.28m	x	55.74m	
2nd place, silver medalist(s)	Jon O'Neil	United States	52.55m	x	x	53.26m	x	50.44m	53.26m	
3rd place, bronze medalist(s)	Edwin Guilloty	Puerto Rico	47.63m	48.10m	45.49m	48.74m	48.45m	46.81m	48.74m	
4	Lance Montigny	Canada	46.12m	x	46.78m	45.44m	47.48m	x	47.48m	
5	José Gonzalo May	Mexico	44.77m	42.25m	44.05m	37.85m	39.65m	42.85m	44.77m	
6	Cutberto Martínez	Mexico	42.06m	40.35m	x	x	x	41.68m	42.06m	
	Akim Herbert	Saint Lucia	x	x	-	-	-	-	NM	

=== Hammer throw ===
Final

Rank	Name	Nationality	Attempts						Result	Notes
Rank	Name	Nationality	1	2	3	4	5	6	Result	Notes
1st place, gold medalist(s)	Jake Freeman	United States	65.62m	66.49m	x	x	x	x	66.49m	
2nd place, silver medalist(s)	Carey Ryan	United States	61.58m	58.18m	61.43m	61.41m	60.62m	60.01m	61.58m	
3rd place, bronze medalist(s)	Mike Sagert	Canada	48.73m	x	47.21m	x	x	x	48.73m	
4	Miguel Sarquiz	Mexico	x	x	45.33m	x	47.84m	47.18m	47.84m	

=== Javelin throw ===
Final

Rank	Name	Nationality	Attempts						Result	Notes
Rank	Name	Nationality	1	2	3	4	5	6	Result	Notes
1st place, gold medalist(s)	Christopher Clever	United States	64.25m	67.63m	68.17m	67.36m	67.90m	68.53m	68.53m	
2nd place, silver medalist(s)	Justin St.Clair	United States	64.48m	67.31m	63.43m	x	66.25m	x	67.31m	
3rd place, bronze medalist(s)	Kieron Francis	Grenada	57.83m	58.85m	x	56.90m	63.22m	58.88m	63.22m	
4	Gustavo Siller	Mexico	61.97m	x	57.65m	60.05m	x	x	61.97m	
5	Javier Ugarte	Nicaragua	56.31m	56.18m	56.40m	56.53m	57.90m	58.97m	58.97m	
6	Pat Clark	Canada	54.94m	53.94m	52.80m	52.60m	58.22m	57.12m	58.22m	
7	José Raúl Lanza	Honduras	41.06m	x	x	x	45.77m	x	45.77m	

=== Decathlon ===
Final

Rank	Name	Nationality	100m	LJ	SP	HJ	400m	110m H	DT	PV	JT	1500m	Points	Notes
1st place, gold medalist(s)	David Lemen	United States	11.33 (1.3); 789pts	6.88 (-0.2); 785pts	12.85; 658pts	1.86; 679pts	52.28; 713pts	15.42 (-1.9); 799pts	37.98; 624pts	5.10; 941pts	56.74; 689pts	4:59.57; 562pts	7239	
2nd place, silver medalist(s)	Josef Karas	Canada	11.38 (1.3); 778pts	7.03 (-1.7); 821pts	12.45; 634pts	1.86; 679pts	52.32; 711pts	16.28 (-1.9); 702pts	42.75; 721pts	4.40; 731pts	45.22; 518pts	4:47.74; 632pts	6927	
3rd place, bronze medalist(s)	Clifford Caines	Canada											6833	
4	Juan Pedro Santarrosa	Mexico											6111	

=== 20,000 meters walk ===
Final

Rank	Name	Nationality	Time	Notes
1st place, gold medalist(s)	Cristián Berdeja	Mexico	1:32:20.00	
2nd place, silver medalist(s)	Steve Quirke	United States	1:44:20.00	
	Donald Cote	Canada	DNF	

=== 4×100 meters relay ===
Final

Rank	Nation	Competitors	Time	Notes
1st place, gold medalist(s)	United States	Tom Green; Jason Smoots; Tyson Gay; Derrick Johnson	39.79	
2nd place, silver medalist(s)	Bahamas	Osbourne Moxey; Jamial Rolle; Christopher Brown; Dominic Demeritte	39.81	
3rd place, bronze medalist(s)	Jamaica	Lerone Clarke; Ainsley Waugh; Winston Smith; Richard James	39.86	
4	Canada	Jared MacLeod; Rhoan Sterling; Jayson Hilchie; Adam Kunkel	40.03	
5	Dominican Republic	Leonardo Matos; Joel Báez; Luis Céspedes; Carlos Yohelin Santa	40.29	
6	Barbados	Jason Gill; Kevin Bartlett; Hugh Henry; Hugh Reid	40.49	
7	Puerto Rico	Joshwyn Rojas; Osvaldo Nieves; Rogelio Pizarro; Aarón Garnett	40.66	

=== 4×400 meters relay ===
Final

Rank	Nation	Competitors	Time	Notes
1st place, gold medalist(s)	United States	James Carter; William Kenyon; Godfrey Herring; Brandon Couts	3:01.15	
2nd place, silver medalist(s)	Jamaica	Dean Griffiths; Richard James; Aldwyn Sappleton; Lanceford Spence	3:05.19	
3rd place, bronze medalist(s)	Bahamas	Ednal Rolle; Alexius Roberts; Dwayne Lynes; Christopher Brown	3:07.47	
4	Puerto Rico	Aarón Garnett; Luis Soto; Joshwyn Rojas; Rogelio Pizarro	3:12.46	

== Women's results ==
=== 100 meters ===
Final
Wind: +0.3 m/s

Rank	Name	Nationality	Time	Notes
1st place, gold medalist(s)	Amandi Rhett	United States	11.62	
2nd place, silver medalist(s)	Melocia Clarke	Jamaica	11.66	
3rd place, bronze medalist(s)	Tamica Clarke	Bahamas	11.67	
4	Nakeya Crutchfield	United States	11.96	
5	Judythe Kitson	Jamaica	12.14	
6	Ruth Grajeda	Mexico	12.22	
7	Karla Hernández	El Salvador	12.73	
8	Auxiliadora Bonilla	Nicaragua	12.88	

=== 200 meters ===
Final
Wind: -0.3 m/s

Rank	Name	Nationality	Time	Notes
1st place, gold medalist(s)	Shellene Williams	Jamaica	23.78	
2nd place, silver medalist(s)	Winsome Howell	Jamaica	24.17	
3rd place, bronze medalist(s)	Martine Cloutier-LeBlanc	Canada	24.34	
4	Melinda Smedley	United States	24.37	
5	Ruth Grajeda	Mexico	24.82	
6	Kadie Joseph	U.S. Virgin Islands	25.39	
	Clara Hernández	Dominican Republic	DNF	
	Crystal Cox	United States	DQ	^{†}

^{†}: Crystal Cox ranked initially 1st (23.02s), but was disqualified later for infringement of IAAF doping rules.

Heat 1
Wind: +0.0 m/s

Rank	Name	Nationality	Time	Notes
1	Shellene Williams	Jamaica	24.10	Q
2	Kadie Joseph	U.S. Virgin Islands	25.62	Q
3	Karla Hernández	El Salvador	26.05	
	Crystal Cox	United States	DQ	Q ^{†}

^{†}: Crystal Cox initially reached the final (23.17s), but was disqualified later for infringement of IAAF doping rules.

Heat 2
Wind: -0.3 m/s

Rank	Name	Nationality	Time	Notes
1	Winsome Howell	Jamaica	24.07	Q
2	Martine Cloutier-LeBlanc	Canada	24.56	Q
3	Clara Hernández	Dominican Republic	24.62	Q
4	Ruth Grajeda	Mexico	24.65	q
5	Melinda Smedley	United States	24.68	q

=== 400 meters ===
Final

Rank	Name	Nationality	Time	Notes
1st place, gold medalist(s)	Allison Beckford	Jamaica	51.21	
2nd place, silver medalist(s)	Christine Amertil	Bahamas	52.80	
3rd place, bronze medalist(s)	Tia Trent	United States	53.08	
4	Lorena de la Rosa	Dominican Republic	53.79	
5	Nadia Cunningham	Jamaica	53.86	
6	Magali Yáñez	Mexico	54.50	
7	Martine Cloutier-LeBlanc	Canada	55.36	
	Crystal Cox	United States	51.63	^{†}

^{†}: Crystal Cox ranked initially 2nd (51.63s), but was disqualified later for infringement of IAAF doping rules.

Heat 1

Rank	Name	Nationality	Time	Notes
1	Christine Amertil	Bahamas	52.41	Q
2	Tia Trent	United States	52.60	Q
3	Nadia Cunningham	Jamaica	54.02	q
4	Magali Yáñez	Mexico	55.36	q
5	Kadie Joseph	U.S. Virgin Islands	56.39	
	Crystal Cox	United States	52.24	Q ^{†}

^{†}: Crystal Cox initially reached the final (52.24s), but was disqualified later for infringement of IAAF doping rules.

Heat 2

Rank	Name	Nationality	Time	Notes
1	Allison Beckford	Jamaica	54.48	Q
2	Lorena de la Rosa	Dominican Republic	54.94	Q
3	Martine Cloutier-LeBlanc	Canada	55.81	Q
	Yelmi Martínez	Dominican Republic	55.81	

=== 800 meters ===
Final

Rank	Name	Nationality	Time	Notes
1st place, gold medalist(s)	Chantee Earl	United States	2:03.17	
2nd place, silver medalist(s)	Sasha Spencer	United States	2:04.47	
3rd place, bronze medalist(s)	Tamika Williams	Bermuda	2:05.52	
4	Lizaira del Valle	Puerto Rico	2:07.94	
5	Angeles Pantoja	Mexico	2:09.50	
6	Allison Salter	Canada	2:10.65	
7	Ana Lucía Hurtado	Guatemala	2:11.29	
8	Sherma Aurelien	U.S. Virgin Islands	2:25.57	

=== 1500 meters ===
Final

Rank	Name	Nationality	Time	Notes
1st place, gold medalist(s)	Bethany Brewster	United States	4:28.16	
2nd place, silver medalist(s)	Maurica Carlucci	United States	4:31.26	
3rd place, bronze medalist(s)	Heather Lee	Canada	4:37.62	

=== 5000 meters ===
Final

Rank	Name	Nationality	Time	Notes
1st place, gold medalist(s)	Ann Brooks	United States	16:57.02	
2nd place, silver medalist(s)	Gisel Bautista	Mexico	17:19.27	

=== Half marathon ===
Final

Rank	Name	Nationality	Time	Notes
1st place, gold medalist(s)	Madaí Pérez	Mexico	1:16:05.00	
2nd place, silver medalist(s)	Alison Holinka	United States	1:22:02.00	
3rd place, bronze medalist(s)	Beth Fonner	United States	1:27:02.00	

=== 3000 meters steeplechase ===
Final

Rank	Name	Nationality	Time	Notes
1st place, gold medalist(s)	Mollie DeFrancesco	United States	10:53.47	
2nd place, silver medalist(s)	Kristen Brennard	Canada	11:05.47	

=== 100 meters hurdles ===
Final
Wind: +1.7 m/s

Rank	Name	Nationality	Time	Notes
1st place, gold medalist(s)	Toni-Ann D'Oyley	Jamaica	12.92	
2nd place, silver medalist(s)	Danielle Carruthers	United States	13.00	
3rd place, bronze medalist(s)	Chitua Ohaeri	United States	13.52	
4	Jessica King	Canada	13.87	
5	Lucilia Contreras	Mexico	13.92	

=== 400 meters hurdles ===
Final

Rank	Name	Nationality	Time	Notes
1st place, gold medalist(s)	Megan Addy	United States	57.22	
2nd place, silver medalist(s)	Brenda Taylor	United States	57.65	
3rd place, bronze medalist(s)	Jazmín Rodríguez	Dominican Republic	1:01.78	
4	Lourdes Escalona	Mexico	1:04.32	

=== High jump ===
Final

Rank	Name	Nationality	Attempts												Result	Notes
Rank	Name	Nationality	1.60	1.65	1.70	1.76	1.79	1.82	1.85	1.87	1.89	1.92	1.95	1.98	Result	Notes
1st place, gold medalist(s)	Juana Arrendel	Dominican Republic	-	-	-	o	o	o	o	o	o	o	o	xxx	1.95m	
2nd place, silver medalist(s)	Kristen Matthews	Canada	-	-	o	o	o	xo	xxo	xxx					1.85m	
3rd place, bronze medalist(s)	Gina Curtis-Rickert	United States	o	o	o	xxo	xxx								1.76m	

=== Pole vault ===
Final

Rank	Name	Nationality	Attempts																Result	Notes
Rank	Name	Nationality	3.10	3.25	3.35	3.45	3.55	3.60	3.65	3.70	3.75	3.80	3.85	3.90	3.95	4.00	4.10	4.30	Result	Notes
1st place, gold medalist(s)	Andrea Wildrick	United States	-	-	-	-	-	-	-	-	-	-	-	-	o	o	o	xxx	4.10m	
2nd place, silver medalist(s)	Dana Ellis	Canada	-	-	-	-	-	-	-	-	-	-	-	xxo	-	xo	xxx		4.00m	
3rd place, bronze medalist(s)	Alejandra Mesa	Mexico	-	-	-	-	o	-	o	-	o	-	xxx						3.75m	
4	Michelle Vélez	Puerto Rico	-	-	-	-	-	xxo	-	xxx									3.60m	
5	Jéssica Piñon	Mexico	o	o	xo	xxx													3.35m	
	Kelsie Hendry	Canada	-	-	-	-	-	-	-	-	-	xxx							NH	
	Becky Holliday	United States	-	-	-	-	-	-	-	xxx									NH	
	Andrea Zambrana	Puerto Rico	-	-	-	-	-	xxx											NH	

=== Long jump ===
Final

Rank	Name	Nationality	Attempts						Result	Notes
Rank	Name	Nationality	1	2	3	4	5	6	Result	Notes
1st place, gold medalist(s)	Brianna Glenn	United States	x (-0.8)	5.84m (-1.3)	6.11m (-0.8)	5.83m (-2.4)	6.02m (-1.0)	6.22m (-1.0)	6.22m (-1.0 m/s)	
2nd place, silver medalist(s)	Melocia Clarke	Jamaica	5.89m (0.0)	6.10m (-0.8)	6.04m (-1.6)	5.96m (-1.3)	6.15m (-0.8)	5.84m (-1.5)	6.15m (-0.8 m/s)	
3rd place, bronze medalist(s)	Rose Richmond	United States	5.92m (0.0)	5.99m (-0.8)	5.98m (-2.1)	6.13m (-2.4)	6.14m (-1.5)	x (-0.6)	6.14m (-1.5 m/s)	
4	Ayesha Maycock	Barbados	x (0.0)	5.70m (0.0)	5.70m (-1.0)	5.62m (-2.7)	5.69m (-1.1)	6.02m (-0.9)	6.02m (-0.9 m/s)	
5	Lauren Maul	Barbados	x (-0.1)	5.69m (0.0)	5.58m (-2.9)	5.49m (-1.9)	x (-2.0)	x (-1.1)	5.69m (+0.0 m/s)	
6	Kelly Goheen	Canada	5.09m (-0.5)	x (-2.1)	x (-1.2)	x (-1.8)	x (-1.3)	5.07m (-1.6)	5.09m (-0.5 m/s)	

=== Triple jump ===
Final

Rank	Name	Nationality	Attempts						Result	Notes
Rank	Name	Nationality	1	2	3	4	5	6	Result	Notes
1st place, gold medalist(s)	Yuliana Perez	United States	13.26m (-0.1)	13.22m (-1.9)	13.27m (-0.9)	13.08m (-1.5)	13.05m (-0.2)	13.24m (0.1)	13.27m (-0.9 m/s)	
2nd place, silver medalist(s)	Teresa Bundy	United States	12.56m (1.0)	x (-1.6)	12.39m (-0.7)	12.58m (-4.6)	12.17m (-2.0)	12.77m (-0.2)	12.77m (-0.2 m/s)	
3rd place, bronze medalist(s)	Paola Noncayo	Mexico	x (-0.1)	x (0.7)	12.08m (1.1)	x (-3.8)	x (-1.1)	12.05m (-0.7)	12.08m (+1.1 m/s)	

=== Shot put ===
Final

Rank	Name	Nationality	Attempts						Result	Notes
Rank	Name	Nationality	1	2	3	4	5	6	Result	Notes
1st place, gold medalist(s)	Cynthia Ademiluyi	United States	15.80m	15.94m	15.89m	16.04m	16.55m	16.65m	16.65m	
2nd place, silver medalist(s)	Cleopatra Borrel	Trinidad and Tobago	15.82m	15.91m	16.19m	16.24m	16.46m	x	16.46m	
3rd place, bronze medalist(s)	Adriane Blewitt	United States	15.30m	15.85m	15.11m	16.15m	16.24m	16.03m	16.24m	
4	Melissa Gibbon	Jamaica	14.74m	x	15.48m	15.28m	15.30m	15.83m	15.83m	
5	Caroline Larose	Canada	14.67m	14.57m	14.34m	x	13.92m	15.11m	15.11m	
6	Doris Thompson	Bahamas	13.02m	11.14m					13.02m	
7	Tahirah Lewis	British Virgin Islands	10.62m	x	x	10.48m			10.62m	

=== Discus throw ===
Final

Rank	Name	Nationality	Attempts						Result	Notes
Rank	Name	Nationality	1	2	3	4	5	6	Result	Notes
1st place, gold medalist(s)	Summer Pierson	United States	51.71m	50.93m	49.25m	x	50.96m	53.04m	53.04m	
2nd place, silver medalist(s)	Deshaua Williams	United States	x	48.16m	49.35m	48.38m	50.63m	52.30m	52.30m	
3rd place, bronze medalist(s)	Julie Bourgon	Canada	41.57m	48.44m	45.24m	45.82m	49.30m	50.32m	50.32m	
4	Melissa Gibbon	Jamaica	46.84m	47.73m	46.88m	45.16m	44.65m	45.19m	47.73m	
5	Marie-Josée Le Jour	Canada	45.76m	x	x	45.73m	45.88m	43.33m	45.88m	
6	Doris Thompson	Bahamas	42.26m	42.95m	x	x	x	42.33m	42.95m	
7	Tahirah Lewis	British Virgin Islands	x	x	26.02m	x	30.76m	x	30.76m	

=== Hammer throw ===
Final

Rank	Name	Nationality	Attempts						Result	Notes
Rank	Name	Nationality	1	2	3	4	5	6	Result	Notes
1st place, gold medalist(s)	Jamine Moton	United States	58.45m	61.00m	65.10m	64.38m	x	x	65.10m	
2nd place, silver medalist(s)	Amber Campbell	United States	57.77m	54.31m	60.61m	59.82m	62.71m	62.66m	62.71m	
3rd place, bronze medalist(s)	Jennifer Joyce	Canada	52.89m	57.08m	58.61m	x	x	x	58.61m	
4	Nathalie Thénor	Canada	54.12m	x	x	x	51.65m	55.39m	55.39m	
5	Jéssica Ponce	Mexico	47.46m	44.70m	40.17m	45.51m	x	44.93m	47.46m	

=== Javelin throw ===
Final

Rank	Name	Nationality	Attempts						Result	Notes
Rank	Name	Nationality	1	2	3	4	5	6	Result	Notes
1st place, gold medalist(s)	Denise O'Connell	United States	45.73m	48.53m	x	x	52.98m	x	52.98m	
2nd place, silver medalist(s)	Dominique Bilodeau	Canada	50.45m	46.65m	48.42m	50.16m	48.13m	49.17m	50.45m	
3rd place, bronze medalist(s)	Brianne Johnson	United States	x	42.88m	38.39m	40.26m	40.66m	x	42.88m	

=== Heptathlon ===
Final

Rank	Name	Nationality	100m H	HJ	SP	200m	LJ	JT	800m	Points	Notes
1st place, gold medalist(s)	Virginia Miller	United States	13.96 (-0.2); 984pts	1.71; 867pts	11.90; 654pts	24.79 (-0.7); 906pts	5.48 (-1.8); 694pts	35.91; 589pts	2:24.22; 767pts	5461	
2nd place, silver medalist(s)	Sarah Junkin	Canada	14.80 (-0.2); 868pts	1.56; 689pts	10.59; 568pts	25.16 (-0.7); 872pts	5.35 (-0.4); 657pts	33.47; 542pts	2:19.95; 824pts	5020	
3rd place, bronze medalist(s)	Judith Méndez	Dominican Republic	14.70 (-0.2); 882pts	1.59; 724pts	10.70; 575pts	25.76 (-0.7); 818pts	4.95 (0.4); 546pts	46.15; 786pts	2:30.81; 683pts	5014	
4	Samantha Anderson	Canada								4967	
5	Damaris Diana	Puerto Rico								4787	
6	Beatriz Pompa	Mexico								4404	
	Lindsay Taylor	United States								DNF	

=== 20,000 meters walk ===
Final

Rank	Name	Nationality	Time	Notes
1st place, gold medalist(s)	Marina Crivello	Canada	1:52:50.00	

=== 4×100 meters relay ===
Final

Rank	Nation	Competitors	Time	Notes
1st place, gold medalist(s)	United States	Brianna Glenn; Danielle Carruthers; Nakeya Crutchfield; Amandi Rhett	44.10	
2nd place, silver medalist(s)	Jamaica	Melocia Clarke; Judythe Kitson; Shellene Williams; Winsome Howell	44.86	

=== 4×400 meters relay ===
Final

Rank	Nation	Competitors	Time	Notes
1st place, gold medalist(s)	Jamaica	Jenice Daley; Allison Beckford; Nadia Cunningham; Shellene Williams	3:34.06	
2nd place, silver medalist(s)	Dominican Republic	Clara Hernández; Yelmi Martínez; Jazmín Rodríguez; Lorena de la Rosa	3:40.29	
	United States	Marie Woodward; Crystal Cox; Chantee Earl; Sasha Spencer	3:30.60	^{†}

^{†}: The event was initially won by the United States (3:30.60 min), but the team was later disqualified for infringement of IAAF doping rules by team member Crystal Cox.
