= 2003 World Championships in Athletics – Men's 400 metres hurdles =

These are the official results of the Men's 400 metres hurdles event at the 2003 IAAF World Championships in Paris, France. There were a total number of 36 participating athletes, with five qualifying heats, three semi-finals and the final held on Friday August 29, 2003 at 22:05h.

== Summary ==
Félix Sánchez went out with purpose, to defend his championship, taking a clear lead over the first hurdle. He never looked back, just continuing to extend his lead to win by almost a full second. His winning time of 47.25 turned out to be the lifetime personal record of the future double Olympic gold medalist. It was the number 7 time in history, at the time, and has only been surpassed once since, by .01 by 2008 gold medalist Angelo Taylor, though it was also tied by Kerron Clement as he won the 2016 Olympics (which name-checks all Olympic champions from this era, 2000-2016).

Behind Sánchez was the battle for the other medals. Immediately outside of Sánchez, Joey Woody started slower, so Sánchez made up the stagger and passed Woody between the second and third hurdle. The closest to Sánchez, immediately to his inside was Periklis Iakovakis. Through the final turn, Chris Rawlinson and Danny McFarlane began to pull even with Iakovakis. By the eighth hurdle, Llewellyn Herbert pulled even with McFarlane. Between the eighth and ninth hurdles, Herbert put on a burst that put a meter on everyone except Sánchez, with Woody moving into contention behind him. Herbert had a firm grasp on silver until he hit the tenth hurdle, sprawling him to the track. Woody was the next to clear the hurdle and finished strongly to take that silver, a meter ahead of Iakovakis.

== Final ==
| RANK | FINAL | TIME |
|---|---|---|
| | Félix Sánchez (DOM) | 47.25 |
| | Joey Woody (USA) | 48.18 |
| | Periklis Iakovakis (GRE) | 48.24 |
| 4. | Danny McFarlane (JAM) | 48.30 |
| 5. | Kemel Thompson (JAM) | 48.51 |
| 6. | Christopher Rawlinson (GBR) | 48.90 |
| 7. | Mubarak Faraj Al-Nubi (QAT) | 52.64 |
| 8. | Llewellyn Herbert (RSA) | 1:12.10 |

== Semi-final ==
- Held on Wednesday 2003-08-27

| RANK | HEAT 1 | TIME |
|---|---|---|
| 1. | Periklis Iakovakis (GRE) | 48.17 |
| 2. | Joey Woody (USA) | 48.24 |
| 3. | Danny McFarlane (JAM) | 48.35 |
| 4. | Mubarak Faraj Al-Nubi (QAT) | 48.53 |
| 5. | Stéphane Diagana (FRA) | 48.64 |
| 6. | Boris Gorban (RUS) | 49.42 |
| 7. | Mikael Jakobsson (SWE) | 50.06 |
| — | Anthony Borsumato (GBR) | DNF |

| RANK | HEAT 2 | TIME |
|---|---|---|
| 1. | Félix Sánchez (DOM) | 48.16 |
| 2. | Christopher Rawlinson (GBR) | 48.56 |
| 3. | Dean Griffiths (JAM) | 48.64 |
| 4. | Yevgeniy Meleshenko (KAZ) | 48.84 |
| 5. | Alwyn Myburgh (RSA) | 48.98 |
| 6. | Stepan Tesarik (CZE) | 49.23 |
| 7. | Dai Tamesue (JPN) | 49.37 |
| 8. | Naman Keïta (FRA) | 49.57 |

| RANK | HEAT 3 | TIME |
|---|---|---|
| 1. | Kemel Thompson (JAM) | 48.33 |
| 2. | Llewellyn Herbert (RSA) | 48.60 |
| 3. | Jirí Mužík (CZE) | 48.82 |
| 4. | Eric Thomas (USA) | 49.00 |
| 5. | Hadi Soua'an Al-Somaily (KSA) | 49.25 |
| 6. | Ockert Cilliers (RSA) | 49.32 |
| 7. | Eduardo Iván Rodríguez (ESP) | 50.06 |
| 8. | Sébastien Maillard (FRA) | 50.70 |

== Heats ==
Held on Tuesday 2003-08-26

| RANK | HEAT 1 | TIME |
|---|---|---|
| 1. | Periklis Iakovakis (GRE) | 48.76 |
| 2. | Eric Thomas (USA) | 48.87 |
| 3. | Stéphane Diagana (FRA) | 49.00 |
| 4. | Dai Tamesue (JPN) | 49.45 |
| 5. | Ari-Pekka Lattu (FIN) | 50.19 |
| 6. | Adam Kunkel (CAN) | 50.68 |
| 7. | Michael Aguilar (BIZ) | 51.33 |

| RANK | HEAT 2 | TIME |
|---|---|---|
| 1. | Joey Woody (USA) | 48.53 |
| 2. | Christopher Rawlinson (GBR) | 48.73 |
| 3. | Mubarak Faraj Al-Nubi (QAT) | 48.90 |
| 4. | Boris Gorban (RUS) | 49.07 |
| 5. | Naman Keïta (FRA) | 49.08 |
| 6. | Eduardo Iván Rodríguez (ESP) | 49.37 |
| 7. | Edivaldo Monteiro (POR) | 50.31 |
| 8. | Tien-Wen Chen (TPE) | 51.42 |

| RANK | HEAT 3 | TIME |
|---|---|---|
| 1. | Kemel Thompson (JAM) | 48.63 |
| 2. | Jirí Mužík (CZE) | 48.88 |
| 3. | Alwyn Myburgh (RSA) | 48.92 |
| 4. | Hadi Soua'an Al-Somaily (KSA) | 48.97 |
| 5. | Anthony Borsumato (GBR) | 49.16 |
| 6. | Mikael Jakobsson (SWE) | 49.40 |
| 7. | Yacnier Luis (CUB) | 49.73 |

| RANK | HEAT 4 | TIME |
|---|---|---|
| 1. | Félix Sánchez (DOM) | 48.43 |
| 2. | Dean Griffiths (JAM) | 48.75 |
| 3. | Ockert Cilliers (RSA) | 49.17 |
| 4. | Sébastien Maillard (FRA) | 49.25 |
| 5. | Cédric El-Idrissi (SUI) | 50.04 |
| 6. | Ken Yoshizawa (JPN) | 50.34 |
| 7. | Bayano Kamani (PAN) | 51.18 |

| RANK | HEAT 5 | TIME |
|---|---|---|
| 1. | Llewellyn Herbert (RSA) | 48.55 |
| 2. | Danny McFarlane (JAM) | 48.86 |
| 3. | Yevgeniy Meleshenko (KAZ) | 48.95 |
| 4. | Stepan Tesarik (CZE) | 49.09 |
| 5. | Victor Okorie (NGR) | 49.66 |
| — | Bershawn Jackson (USA) | DQ |
| — | Ibrahim Maïga (MLI) | DQ |

== See also ==
- Athletics at the 2003 Pan American Games - Men's 400 metres hurdles
