= IAAF Continental Cup =

International athletics tournament

- Status: defunct
- Genre: Track and field
- Date: varying
- Frequency: biennial
- Country: varying
- Years active: 1977–2018
- Inaugurated: 1977
- Most recent: 2018
- Organiser: World Athletics
- Website: worldathletics.org

The IAAF Continental Cup was an international track and field competition organized by the International Association of Athletics Federations (IAAF).

The event was proposed by IAAF former President Primo Nebiolo and was first held in 1977 as the IAAF World Cup. The event was initially held every two years, but following the establishment of the World Athletics Championships it moved to a quadrennial basis. The 1989 edition was held the same year as the World Indoor Championships, then moved to the even-year between the Summer Olympics, ensuring the sport of athletics had a global competition in all years.

The original format included separate men's and women's competitions consisting of 21 events each, with team points being awarded for the finishing position of each athlete. Eight teams, five continental and three national, entered an athlete in each event: if the stadium had a ninth lane, the host nation would also be permitted to enter.

The eight entrants included the United States, the top two nations in the preceding European Cup and continental teams comprising Africa, Asia, Oceania, the rest of the Americas (North American, Central American and Caribbean Athletic Association and Confederación Sudamericana de Atletismo), and the rest of Europe.

From 2010, the event was rebranded to the IAAF Continental Cup, with the national teams being removed, and team scoring incorporated both the sexes. Two athletes per individual event were entered by four regional teams: Africa, Asia/Pacific, Europe and the Americas), though the regions had only one team each for the relay events.

After a decision at the 206th IAAF Council Meeting, held after the 2016 Summer Olympics, long-distance events were removed from the programme, and the 4 × 400 metres relay event was modified to a mixed-gender event.

A nation-based competition, the Athletics World Cup, was staged in 2018 by an independent promoter. The IAAF competition was briefly rebranded as the World Athletics Continental Cup in 2019, but the event was scrapped in March 2020.

== Results ==
=== IAAF World Cup ===
Edition	Year	Venue	Division	Cup winners	Second place	Third place
1st	1977	Düsseldorf	Men	East Germany	United States	West Germany
1st	1977	Düsseldorf	Women	Europe	East Germany	Soviet Union
2nd	1979	Montreal	Men	United States	Europe	East Germany
2nd	1979	Montreal	Women	East Germany	Soviet Union	Europe
3rd	1981	Rome	Men	Europe	East Germany	United States
3rd	1981	Rome	Women	East Germany	Europe	Soviet Union
4th	1985	Canberra	Men	United States	Soviet Union	East Germany
4th	1985	Canberra	Women	East Germany	Soviet Union	Europe
5th	1989	Barcelona	Men	United States	Europe	(United Kingdom) Great Britain
5th	1989	Barcelona	Women	East Germany	Soviet Union	(United States) America
6th	1992	Havana	Men	Africa	(United Kingdom) Great Britain	Europe
6th	1992	Havana	Women	(Commonwealth of Independent States) Unified Team	Europe	(United States) America
7th	1994	London	Men	Africa	(United Kingdom) Great Britain	(United States) America
7th	1994	London	Women	Europe	(United States) America	Germany
8th	1998	Johannesburg	Men	Africa	Europe	Germany
8th	1998	Johannesburg	Women	United States	Europe	Africa
9th	2002	Madrid	Men	Africa	Europe	United States
9th	2002	Madrid	Women	Russia	Europe	(United States) America
10th	2006	Athens	Men	Europe	United States	Africa
10th	2006	Athens	Women	Russia	Europe	(United States) America

=== IAAF Continental Cup ===
Year	Venue		Cup winners	Second place	Third place	Fourth place
2010	Split, Croatia	Overall	(Organization of American States) Americas	Europe	(African Union) Africa	Asia/Pacific
2010	Split, Croatia	Points	424.5	410	295	292.5
2010	Split, Croatia	Men	Europe	(Organization of American States) Americas	(African Union) Africa	Asia/Pacific
2010	Split, Croatia	Women	(Organization of American States) Americas	Europe	(African Union) Africa	Asia/Pacific
2014	Marrakesh, Morocco	Overall	Europe	(Organization of American States) Americas	(African Union) Africa	Asia/Pacific
2014	Marrakesh, Morocco	Points	447.5	390	339	257.5
2014	Marrakesh, Morocco	Men	Europe	(Organization of American States) Americas	(African Union) Africa	Asia/Pacific
2014	Marrakesh, Morocco	Women	Europe	(Organization of American States) Americas	(African Union) Africa	Asia/Pacific
2018	Ostrava, Czech Republic	Overall	(Organization of American States) Americas	Europe	Asia/Pacific	(African Union) Africa
2018	Ostrava, Czech Republic	Points	262	233	188	142

== Cup records ==
Key to tables: not ratified or later rescinded by IAAF

=== Men ===
Event	Record	Name	Nationality	Team	Date	Games	Ref.
100 m	9.87 (−0.2 m/s)	Obadele Thompson	Barbados	Americas	11 September 1998	1998 Johannesburg	
200 m	19.87 (+0.1 m/s)	Wallace Spearmon	United States	United States	17 September 2006	2006 Athens	
400 m	44.22	Jeremy Wariner	United States	Americas	4 September 2010	2010 Split	
800 m	1:43.37	David Rudisha	Kenya	Africa	5 September 2010	2010 Split	
1500 m	3:31.20	Bernard Lagat	United States	United States	20 September 2002	2002 Madrid	
3000 m	7:32.19	Craig Mottram	Australia	Oceania	17 September 2006	2006 Athens	
5000 m	13:13.82	Miruts Yifter	Ethiopia	Africa	3 July 1977	1977 Düsseldorf	
10,000 m	27:38.43	Werner Schildhauer	East Germany	East Germany	4 September 1981	1981 Rome	
3000 m steeplechase	8:09.67	Richard Mateelong	Kenya	Africa	5 September 2010	2010 Split	
110 m hurdles	12.96 (+0.4 m/s)	Allen Johnson	United States	United States	17 September 2006	2006 Athens	
400 m hurdles	47.37	Edwin Moses	United States	United States	4 September 1981	1981 Rome	
400 m hurdles	47.37	Abderrahman Samba	Qatar	Asia-Pacific	8 September 2018	2018 Ostrava	
High jump	2.40 m	Javier Sotomayor	Cuba	Americas	11 September 1994	1994 London	
Pole vault	5.95 m	Steve Hooker	Australia	Oceania	5 September 2010	2010 Split	
Long jump	8.52 m (±0.0 m/s)	Larry Myricks	United States	United States	26 September 1979	1979 Montreal	
Triple jump	17.61 m (+0.6 m/s)	Yoelbi Quesada	Cuba	Americas	10 September 1994	1994 London	
Shot put	22.00 m	Ulf Timmermann	East Germany	East Germany	5 October 1985	1985 Canberra	
Discus throw	71.25 m	Róbert Fazekas	Hungary	Europe	21 September 2002	2002 Madrid	
Hammer throw	82.68 m	Tibor Gécsek	Hungary	Europe	12 September 1998	1998 Johannesburg	
Javelin throw	89.26 m	Andreas Thorkildsen	Norway	Europe	5 September 2010	2010 Split	
4 × 100 m relay	37.59	Kaaron Conwright; Wallace Spearmon; Tyson Gay; Jason Smoots	United States	United States	16 September 2006	2006 Athens	
4 × 400 m relay	2:59.00	Nery Brenes (CRC); Bershawn Jackson (USA); Greg Nixon (USA); Ricardo Chambers (JAM)	Various	Americas	5 September 2010	2010 Split	

=== Women ===
Event	Record	Name	Nationality	Date	Games	Ref.
100 m	10.65 (+1.1 m/s)	Marion Jones	United States	United States	12 September 1998	1998 Johannesburg
200 m	21.62 (−0.6 m/s)	Marion Jones	United States	United States	11 September 1998	1998 Johannesburg
400 m	47.60	Marita Koch	East Germany	East Germany	6 October 1985	1985 Canberra
800 m	1:54.44	Ana Fidelia Quirot	Cuba	Americas	9 September 1989	1989 Barcelona
1500 m	4:00.84	Maryam Yusuf Jamal	Bahrain	Asia	17 September 2006	2006 Athens
3000 m	8:27.50	Sifan Hassan	Netherlands	Europe	8 September 2018	2018 Ostrava
5000 m	14:39.11	Meseret Defar	Ethiopia	Africa	17 September 2006	2006 Athens
10,000 m	30:52.51	Elana Meyer	South Africa	Africa	10 September 1994	1994 London
100 m hurdles	12.47 (+0.7 m/s)	Dawn Harper-Nelson	United States	Americas	14 September 2014	2014 Marrakech
400 m hurdles	52.96	Nezha Bidouane	Morocco	Africa	11 September 1998	1998 Johannesburg
3000 m steeplechase	9:07.92	Beatrice Chepkoech	Kenya	Africa	9 September 2018	2018 Ostrava
High jump	2.05 m	Blanka Vlašić	Croatia	Europe	5 September 2010	2010 Split
Pole vault	4.85 m	Anzhelika Sidorova	Russia	Europe	8 September 2018	2018 Ostrava
Pole vault	4.85 m	Katerina Stefanidi	Greece	Europe	8 September 2018	2018 Ostrava
Pole vault	4.85 m	Sandi Morris	United States	Americas	8 September 2018	2018 Ostrava
Long jump	7.27 m (+0.7 m/s)	Heike Drechsler	East Germany	East Germany	6 October 1985	1985 Canberra
Triple jump	15.25 m (+1.7 m/s)	Olga Rypakova	Kazakhstan	Asia	4 September 2010	2010 Split
Shot put	20.98 m	Ilona Slupianek	East Germany	East Germany	24 August 1979	1979 Montreal
Discus throw	71.54 m	Ilke Wyludda	East Germany	East Germany	10 September 1989	1989 Barcelona
Hammer throw	75.46 m	DeAnna Price	United States	Americas	8 September 2018	2018 Ostrava
Javelin throw	65.52 m	Barbora Špotáková	Czech Republic	Europe	13 September 2014	2014 Marrakech
Javelin throw	~~68.14 m~~	Mariya Abakumova	Russia	Europe	4 September 2010	2010 Split
4 × 100 m relay	41.37	Silke Möller; Sabine Günther; Ingrid Auerswald; Marlies Göhr	East Germany	East Germany	6 October 1985	1985 Canberra
4 × 400 m relay	3:19.50	Kirsten Emmelmann; Sabine Busch; Dagmar Neubauer; Marita Koch	East Germany	East Germany	4 October 1985	1985 Canberra

== Trophy ==
A silver trophy was presented to winners of the men's competition. The women's equivalent was later remodelled and used for the Continental Cup. The winners' names were engraved around the bottom and the winners would keep a hold of the trophy until the next edition.

As the IAAF World Cup, World Cup trophies were presented to the athletes of the winning team. It was the sole prize awarded by the IAAF for the team category.

As the IAAF Continental Cup, in 2018, a new trophy was unveiled for the winners of the combined team event (men and women). All individual athletes of the winning team were presented with awards for the first time.
