= 2002 NACAC Under-25 Championships in Athletics =

II NACAC Under-25 Championships in Athletics
- Dates: August 9–11
- Host city: San Antonio, United States
- Venue: E.M. Stevens Stadium
- Level: U-25
- Events: 45
- Participation: 245 athletes from 24 nations

The 2nd NACAC Under-25 Championships in Athletics were held in San Antonio, Texas, United States on August 9–11, 2002. As in 2000 the event was open for athletes younger than 25 years. A detailed report on the results was given. However, the results were affected by doping (see below).

== Medal summary ==
Medal winners are published. Complete results can be found on the AtletismoCR, on the USA Track & Field, and the Trackie websites.

=== Men ===
Event	Gold		Silver		Bronze	
100 metres	Jason Smoots (USA)	10.22 CR	Tom Green (USA)	10.45	Rhoan Sterling (CAN)	10.47
200 metres	Dominic Demeritte (BAH)	20.60	Ryan Olkowski (USA)	20.91	Ainsley Waugh (JAM)	21.04
400 metres	Chris Brown (BAH)	45.50 CR	Godfrey Herring (USA)	45.65	William Kenyon (USA)	45.76
800 metres	Achraf Tadili (CAN)	1:48.19 CR	Luis Soto (PUR)	1:48.41	Elliott Blount (USA)	1:48.55
1500 metres	Ryan McKenzie (CAN)	3:51.31	Dan Wilson (USA)	3:51.64	Heleodoro Navarro (MEX)	3:52.10
5000 metres	Reid Coolsaet (CAN)	14:44.46	Jonathan Morales (MEX)	14:45.16	Karl Savage (USA)	14:48.35
10,000 metres	Jonathan Morales (MEX)	30:16.26 CR	Brian Sell (USA)	30:16.29	James Carney (USA)	30:48.28
Half Marathon	Michael Wisniewski (USA)	1:10:05				
3000 metres steeplechase	Jordan Desilets (USA)	8:52.10	Ian Collings (CAN)	8:59.73	Luke Watson (USA)	9:19.39
110 metres hurdles	Terrence Trammell (USA)	13.45 CR	Ron Bramlett (USA)	13.53	Jared MacLeod (CAN)	13.80
400 metres hurdles	James Carter (USA)	48.95 CR	Fred Sharpe (USA)	49.73	Dean Griffiths (JAM)	50.06
High jump	Romel Lightbourne (BAH)	2.18m	Terrance Woods (USA)	2.18m	Jaswinder Gill (CAN); Mike Kizinkewich (CAN)	2.15m
Pole vault	Jeremy Scott (USA)	5.55m CR	Brad Walker (USA)	5.30m	Ricardo Pallares (MEX)	5.00m
Long jump	Osbourne Moxey (BAH)	8.19m CR	William Montgomery (USA)	7.90m	LeJuan Simon (USA)	7.78m
Triple jump	Leevan Sands (BAH)	16.72m CR	Greg Yeldell (USA)	16.61m	Quincy Howe (TRI)	15.72m
Shot put	Jon Kalnas (USA)	18.70m	Chris Adams (USA)	17.70m	Dave Stoute (TRI)	17.66m
Discus throw	Jason Young (USA)	55.74m	Jon O'Neil (USA)	53.26m	Edwin Guilloty (PUR)	48.74m
Hammer throw	Jake Freeman (USA)	66.49m	Carey Ryan (USA)	61.58m	Mike Sagert (CAN)	48.73m
Javelin throw	Chris Clever (USA)	68.53m	Justin St. Clair (USA)	67.31m	Keron Francis (GRN)	63.22m
Decathlon	David Lemen (USA)	7239 pts CR	Josef Karas (CAN)	6927 pts	Clifford Caines (CAN)	6833 pts
20 Kilometres Road Walk	Cristián David Berdeja (MEX)	1:32:20	Steve Quirke (USA)	1:44:20		
4 × 100 metres relay	United States; Tom Green; Jason Smoots; Tyson Gay; Derrick Johnson	39.79 CR	Bahamas; Osbourne Moxey; Jamial Rolle; Christopher Brown; Dominic Demeritte	39.81	Jamaica; Lerone Clarke; Ainsley Waugh; Winston Smith; Richard James	39.86
4 × 400 metres relay	United States; James Carter; William Kenyon; Godfrey Herring; Brandon Couts	3:01.15 CR	Jamaica; Dean Griffiths; Richard James; Aldwyn Sappleton; Lanceford Spence	3:05.19	Bahamas; Ednal Rolle; Alexius Roberts; Dwayne Lynes; Christopher Brown	3:07.47

=== Women ===
Event	Gold		Silver		Bronze	
100 metres	Amandi Rhett (USA)	11.62	Melocia Clarke (JAM)	11.66	Tamica Clarke (BAH)	11.67
200 metres	Shellene Williams (JAM)	23.78	Winsome Howell (JAM)	24.17	Martine Cloutier-LeBlanc (CAN)	24.34
400 metres	Allison Beckford (JAM)	51.21 CR	Christine Amertil (BAH)	52.80	Tia Trent (USA)	53.08
800 metres	Chantee Earl (USA)	2:03.17 CR	Sasha Spencer (USA)	2:04.47	Tamika Williams (BER)	2:05.52
1500 metres	Bethany Brewster (USA)	4:28.16	Maurica Carlucci (USA)	4:31.26	Heather Lee (CAN)	4:37.62
5000 metres	Ann Marie Brooks (USA)	16:57.02	Gisel Bautista (MEX)	17:19.27		
3000 metres steeplechase	Mollie DeFrancesco (USA)	10:53.47	Kristen Brennard (CAN)	11:05.47		
Half Marathon	Madai Pérez (MEX)	1:16:15 CR	Alison Holinka (USA)	1:22:02	Beth Fonner (USA)	1:27:02
100 metres hurdles	Toni Ann D'Oyley (JAM)	12.92 CR	Danielle Carruthers (USA)	13.00	Chitua Ohaeri (USA)	13.52
400 metres hurdles	Megan Addy (USA)	57.22 CR	Brenda Taylor (USA)	57.65	Yasmin Rodríguez (DOM)	61.78
High jump	Juana Arrendel (DOM)	1.95m CR	Kristen Matthews (CAN)	1.85m	Gina Curtis-Rickert (USA)	1.76m
Pole vault	Andrea Wildrick (USA)	4.10 mCR	Dana Ellis (CAN)	4.00m	Alejandra Meza (MEX)	3.75m
Long jump	Brianna Glenn (USA)	6.22m	Melocia Clarke (JAM)	6.15m	Rose Richmond (USA)	6.14m
Triple jump	Yuliana Perez (USA)	13.27m =CR	Teresa Bundy (USA)	12.77m	Paola Noncayo (MEX)	12.08m
Shot put	Cynthia Ademiluyi (USA)	16.65m CR	Cleopatra Borel (TRI)	16.46m	Adriane Blewitt (USA)	16.24m
Discus throw	Summer Pierson (USA)	53.04m CR	Deshaya Williams (USA)	52.30m	Julie Bourgon (CAN)	50.32m
Hammer throw	Jamine Moton (USA)	65.10m CR	Amber Campbell (USA)	62.71m	Jennifer Joyce (CAN)	58.61m
Javelin throw	Denise O'Connell (USA)	52.98m	Dominique Bilodeau (CAN)	50.45m	Brianne Johnson (USA)	42.88m
Heptathlon	Virginia Miller (USA)	5461 pts	Sarah Junkin (CAN)	5020 pts	Yudith Méndez (DOM)	5014 pts
20 Kilometres Road Walk	Marina Crivello (CAN)	1:52:50				
4 × 100 metres relay	United States; Brianna Glenn; Danielle Carruthers; Nakeya Crutchfield; Amandi Rhett	44.10 CR	Jamaica; Melocia Clarke; Judythe Kitson; Shellene Williams; Winsome Howell	44.86		
4 × 400 metres relay	Jamaica; Jenice Daley; Allison Beckford; Nadia Cunningham; Shellene Williams	3:34.06 CR	Dominican Republic; Clara Hernandez; Yelmi Martinez; Jazmin Rodriguez; Lorena De La Rosa	3:40.29		

== Doping ==
United States sprinter Crystal Cox, who initially was listed as winner of the women's 200m in 23.02s, was tested positive for ephedrine in the competition, a prohibited substance under the International Amateur Athletic Federation (IAAF) rules. Therefore, she was issued a public warning by the United States Anti-Doping Agency and was disqualified from her first-place finish in the 200 meters. The incident is also reported on the USA Track & Field website and considered in their published results list.

In connection with investigations in the BALCO doping conspiracy, Crystal Cox has accepted a four-year suspension and disqualification of her athletic results, beginning on November 3, 2001, for using anabolic agents and hormones over a period from 2001 through 2004 in violation of the International Association of Athletics Federations Anti-Doping Rules. However, in a separate statement, she felt to be forced to sign the sanctions although being innocent.

In consequence, her silver medal in the 400 metres (51.63s) and the gold medal in the 4 × 400 metres relay (in 3:30.60 together with Marie Woodward, Chantee Earl, and Sasha Spencer) should have been forfeited.

== Medal table (unofficial) ==
* Host nation (United States)

Rank	Nation	Gold	Silver	Bronze	Total
1	United States*	28	24	13	65
2	Bahamas	5	2	2	9
3	Canada	4	7	10	21
4	Jamaica	4	5	3	12
5	Mexico	3	2	4	9
6	Dominican Republic	1	1	2	4
7	Trinidad and Tobago	0	1	2	3
8	Puerto Rico	0	1	1	2
9	Bermuda	0	0	1	1
9	Grenada	0	0	1	1
Totals (10 entries)		45	43	39	127

== Participation ==
The participation of 245 athletes from 24 countries was reported.

- Bahamas (13)
- Barbados (7)
- Bermuda (2)
- British Virgin Islands (2)
- Canada (38)
- Costa Rica (4)
- Dominica (4)
- Dominican Republic (14)
- El Salvador (4)
- Grenada (1)
- Guatemala (3)
- (Haiti) Haïti (2)
- Honduras (5)
- Jamaica (16)
- (Mexico) México (31)
- Netherlands Antilles (1)
- Nicaragua (4)
- Puerto Rico (8)
- Saint Kitts and Nevis (1)
- Saint Lucia (4)
- Saint Vincent and the Grenadines (3)
- Trinidad and Tobago (3)
- United States (71)
- U.S. Virgin Islands (4)
