= Lerone Clarke =

Jamaican track and field sprinter

Personal information
- Full name: Lerone Ephraime Clarke
- Nickname: Seabiscuit
- Born: 7 July 1981 (age 45) Trelawny, Jamaica

Sport
- Sport: Track and field

Achievements and titles
- Personal best: 60 m: 6.47 100 m: 9.99
Medal record
Men's athletics
Representing Jamaica
World Championships
| Gold medal – first place | 2009 Berlin | 4 × 100 m relay |
CAC Championships
| Gold medal – first place | 2011 Mayagüez | 4 × 100 m relay |
| Silver medal – second place | 2009 Havana | 100 m |
Commonwealth Games
| Gold medal – first place | 2010 Delhi | 100 m |
| Silver medal – second place | 2010 Delhi | 4 × 100 m relay |
Pan American Games
| Gold medal – first place | 2011 Guadalajara | 100 m |
Central American and Caribbean Games
| Bronze medal – third place | 2010 Mayagüez | 100 m |

Lerone Ephraime Clarke (born 7 July 1981) is a Jamaican track and field sprinter who specialises in the 100 metres and the 60 metres. He is the former Commonwealth Games champion in the 100 m. His personal best for that distance is 9.99 seconds, set in 2009. He has represented Jamaica three times at the IAAF World Indoor Championships and holds the Jamaican record for the indoor 150 m.

== Career ==
=== Early career ===
Like multiple Olympic champion Usain Bolt and former Jamaican sprinter Michael Green, Clarke is a former student of William Knibb Memorial High School. He attended Lincoln University of Missouri in the United States and competed for their Blue Tigers athletic team in 2002 and 2003.

His first international appearance for Jamaica came at the 2002 NACAC Under-25 Championships in Athletics, where he led off the Jamaican 4 × 100 metres relay team to take the bronze medal. He set a personal best of 10.24 seconds at the 2005 Central American and Caribbean Championships in Athletics, coming sixth in the 100 m final and was also part of the relay team which finished in fifth place. This led to his first selection for Jamaica on the world stage: he finished fourth in 4 × 100 m relay at the 2005 World Championships, together with teammates Dwight Thomas, Ainsley Waugh and Michael Frater.

He earned a spot in the 60 metres at the 2006 IAAF World Indoor Championships and set a personal best of 6.66 seconds in the semi-finals of the event. Outdoors, he represented Jamaica at the 2006 Central American and Caribbean Games and ran a season's best of 10.28 seconds in the 100 m semi-finals. He was slower in the final, finishing fourth, but led of the relay team to the bronze medals. He had a low key 2007 season, although he achieved a 60 m best of 6.64 seconds at the Millrose Games and a 100 m best of 10.15 seconds in Kingston, Jamaica.

=== Sub-10 runner ===
At the start of 2008 he won the 60 m sprint at the Tyson Invitational, but had a poor performance at the 2008 IAAF World Indoor Championships, being eliminated in the heats after a slow start. He competed in only two competitions over 100 m that year: he was a semi-finalist at the Jamaican National Championships and was seventh in the 100 m at the 2008 Central American and Caribbean Championships in Athletics.

Driven on by the success of Jamaica at the 2008 Summer Olympics, he competed extensively in the 2009 outdoor season. He was fifth at the Jamaican Championships and took the 100 m silver medal at the 2009 Central American and Caribbean Championships in Athletics with a significant personal best of 10.08 seconds. He also led off the Jamaican relay team which finished as runners-up. He was selected as a first heat relay runner at the 2009 World Championships in Athletics and received a gold medal as the Jamaican quartet went on to win the title. He competed at a number of smaller meets in the European circuit before going on to set a personal best time of 9.99 seconds at the Weltklasse Zürich in August, becoming the 70th man to have broken the 10-second barrier with an official, legal time. Following this he set a meeting record at Rovereto, Italy, recording 10.11 seconds into a headwind to beat Asafa Powell's previous meet best.

=== Commonwealth champion ===
In the 2010 indoor season he won at the BW-Bank Meeting, Sparkassen Cup and Erdgas Athletics Meeting (setting a 60 m best of 6.55 seconds at the latter). He was chosen for the third time running to run for Jamaica at the 2010 IAAF World Indoor Championships, but was surprisingly eliminated in the heats against lesser opposition. He ran two sub-10-second times at the Doha Athletic Grand Prix, albeit wind-assisted and was a regular competitor on the 2010 IAAF Diamond League circuit. He came fourth at the Jamaican Championships then went on to win a 100 m bronze medal and relay silver medal at the 2010 Central American and Caribbean Games. With the top Jamaican sprinters opting out of the 2010 Commonwealth Games, Clarke was selected to represent his country in the 100 m. He had a fast start in the final and held his lead to win the gold medal, succeeding Asafa Powell as the Commonwealth champion for the event. However, the lack of top athletes was evident from his 10.12-second winning time – the slowest to win the title since Don Quarrie in 1974. He also won a silver medal with the Jamaican relay team.

The year after he led off a Jamaican quartet to win the relay gold medal at the 2011 Central American and Caribbean Championships in Athletics and achieved his season's best of 10.01 seconds to win the individual 100 m title at the 2011 Pan American Games. At the 2012 Birmingham Indoor Grand Prix he caused an upset by defeating both Asafa Powell and Nesta Carter over 60 m as he ran a Jamaican record time of 6.47 seconds to win the race.

== Achievements ==
| Year | Competition | Venue | Position | Event | Notes |
Representing Jamaica
| 2002 | NACAC U-25 Championships | San Antonio, Texas, United States | 4th | 100 m | 10.50 (wind: +0.3 m/s) |
| 2002 | NACAC U-25 Championships | San Antonio, Texas, United States | 3rd | 4 × 100 m relay | 39.86 |
| 2002 | Central American and Caribbean Games | San Salvador, El Salvador | 6th | 100 m | 10.49 w (wind: 2.1 m/s) |
