= 2002 IAAF World Cup =

- Dates: 21–22 September
- Host city: Madrid, Spain
- Venue: Estadio La Peineta
- Events: 39
- Participation: ? athletes

The 9th IAAF World Cup in Athletics was an international track and field sporting event sponsored by the International Association of Athletics Federations. It was hosted by Madrid, September 21–22, 2002, in the Estadio La Peineta.

The team winner of the men's competition was Africa, while the Russian team took the women's cup.

== Overall results ==
=== Men ===
Pos.	Team	Result
1	Africa	139
2	Europe	121
3	Americas	119
4	United States	112
5	Spain	103
6	Germany	96.5
7	Asia	91
8	Oceania	74.5
DSQ^{1}	Great Britain	83

^{1} Great Britain originally finished eighth, but were disqualified in August 2003 after Dwain Chambers admitted to using THG between the beginning of 2002 and August 2003. All other individual results were allowed to stand, but the IAAF ruled these athletes received no score.

=== Women ===
Pos.	Team	Result
1	Russia	129
2	Europe	126
3	Americas	111
4	Africa	102
5	Germany	83.5
6	Spain	78.5
7	Asia	78
8	United States	77
9	Oceania	61

== Men ==
Event	Gold		Silver		Bronze	
100 metres	Uchenna Emedolu (NGR); Africa	10.06	Kim Collins (SKN); Americas	10.06	Francis Obikwelu (POR); Europe	10.09
200 metres	Francis Obikwelu (POR); Europe	20.18	Frankie Fredericks (NAM); Africa	20.20	Marlon Devonish (GBR); Great Britain	20.32
400 metres	Michael Blackwood (JAM); Americas	44.60	Ingo Schultz (GER); Germany	44.86	Fawzi Al Shammari (KUW); Asia	45.14
800 metres	Antonio Manuel Reina (ESP); Spain	1:43.83	Djabir Saïd-Guerni (ALG); Africa	1:44.03	David Krummenacker (USA); United States	1:45.14
1500 metres	Bernard Lagat (KEN); Africa	3:31.20	Reyes Estévez (ESP); Spain	3:33.67	Mehdi Baala (FRA); Europe	3:38.04
3000 metres	Craig Mottram (AUS); Oceania	7:41.37	David Galván (MEX); Americas	7:47.43	Roberto García (ESP); Spain	7:53.96
5000 metres	Alberto García (ESP); Spain	13:30.04	Paul Malakwen Kosgei (KEN); Africa	13:31.71	Ismaïl Sghyr (FRA)} Europe	13:32.82
110 metre hurdles	Anier García (CUB); Americas	13.10	Allen Johnson (USA); United States	13.45	Staņislavs Olijars (LAT); Europe	13.58
400 metre hurdles	James Carter (USA); United States	48.27	Mubarak Al-Nubi (QAT); Asia	48.96	Chris Rawlinson (GBR); Great Britain	49.18
3000 metre steeplechase	Wilson Boit Kipketer (KEN); Africa	8:25.34	Luis Miguel Martín (ESP); Spain	8:26.35	Khamis Abdullah Saifeldin (QAT); Asia	8:30.66
4×100 metre relay	United States; Jon Drummond; Jason Smoots; Kaaron Conwright; Coby Miller	37.95	Americas; Freddy Mayola; Kim Collins; Christopher Williams; Dominic Demeritte	38.32	Africa; Idrissa Sanou; Uchenna Emedolu; Aziz Zakari; Frankie Fredericks	38.63
4×400 metre relay	Americas; Félix Sánchez; Alleyne Francique; Michael McDonald; Michael Blackwood	2:59.19	Africa; Adem Hecini; Sofiane Labidi; Fernando Augustin; Eric Milazar	3:01.69^{1}	Asia; Rohan Pradeep Kumara; Hamdan Al-Bishi; Sugath Thilakaratne; Fawzi Al Shammari	3:03.02
High jump	Yaroslav Rybakov (RUS); Europe	2.31	Mark Boswell (CAN); Americas	2.29	Ben Challenger (GBR); Great Britain	2.20
Pole vault	Okkert Brits (RSA); Africa	5.75	Jeff Hartwig (USA); United States	5.70	Lars Börgeling (GER); Germany	5.40
Long jump	Savanté Stringfellow (USA); United States	8.21	Iván Pedroso (CUB); Americas	8.19	Yago Lamela (ESP); Spain	8.11
Triple jump	Jonathan Edwards (GBR); Great Britain	17.34	Walter Davis (USA); United States	17.23	Christian Olsson (SWE); Europe	17.05
Shot put	Adam Nelson (USA); United States	20.80	Justin Anlezark (AUS); Oceania	20.77	Ralf Bartels (GER); Germany	20.67
Discus throw	Róbert Fazekas (HUN); Europe	71.25	Frantz Kruger (RSA); Africa	66.78	Mario Pestano (ESP); Spain	64.64
Hammer throw	Adrián Annus (HUN); Europe	80.93	Koji Murofushi (JPN); Asia	80.08	Karsten Kobs (GER); Germany	78.44
Javelin throw	Sergey Makarov (RUS); Europe	86.44	Boris Henry (GER); Germany	81.60	Emeterio González (CUB); Americas	79.77

^{1} The United States originally finished second in 2:59.21, but were disqualified in 2009 after Antonio Pettigrew admitted to using HGH and EPO between 1997 and 2003.

== Women ==
Event	Gold		Silver		Bronze	
100 metres	Tayna Lawrence (JAM); Americas	11.06^{1}	Susanthika Jayasinghe (SRI); Asia	11.20	Endurance Ojokolo (NGR); Africa	11.26
200 metres	Debbie Ferguson (BAH); Americas	22.49	Muriel Hurtis (FRA); Europe	22.78	Myriam Mani (CMR); Africa	22.81
400 metres	Ana Guevara (MEX); Americas	49.56	Jearl Miles Clark (USA); United States	50.27	Olesya Zykina (RUS); Russia	50.67
800 metres	Maria Mutola (MOZ); Africa	1:58.60	Mayte Martínez (ESP); Spain	1:59.24	Jolanda Čeplak (SLO); Europe	1:59.42
1500 metres	Süreyya Ayhan (TUR); Europe	4:02.57	Tatyana Tomashova (RUS); Russia	4:09.74	Kathleen Friedrich (GER); Germany	4:10.20
3000 metres	Berhane Adere (ETH); Africa	8:50.88	Gabriela Szabo (ROU); Europe	8:50.89	Yelena Zadorozhnaya (RUS); Russia	8:50.93
5000 metres	Olga Yegorova (RUS); Russia	15:18.15	Marta Domínguez (ESP); Spain	15:19.73	Joanne Pavey (GBR); Great Britain	15:20.10
100 metre hurdles	Gail Devers (USA); United States	12.65	Brigitte Foster (JAM); Americas	12.82	Glory Alozie (ESP); Spain	12.95
400 metre hurdles	Yuliya Pechonkina (RUS); Russia	53.88	Sandra Glover (USA); United States	54.46	Jana Pittman (AUS); Oceania	55.15
4×100 metre relay	Americas; Tayna Lawrence; Juliet Campbell; Beverly McDonald; Debbie Ferguson	41.91	Africa; Chinedu Odozor; Myriam Mani; Makaridja Sanganoko; Endurance Ojokolo	42.99^{2}	Europe; Delphine Combe; Muriel Hurtis; Fabe Dia; Odiah Sidibé	43.30
4×400 metre relay	Americas; Sandie Richards; Daimí Pernía; Christine Amertil; Ana Guevara	3:23.53	Russia; Natalya Antyukh; Yuliya Pechonkina; Natalya Nazarova; Olesya Zykina	3:26.59^{3}	Africa; Mireille Nguimgo; Hortense Béwouda; Maria Mutola; Kaltouma Nadjina	3:26.84
High jump	Hestrie Cloete (RSA); Africa	2.02	Kajsa Bergqvist (SWE); Europe	2.02	Marina Kuptsova (RUS); Russia	2.00
Pole vault	Annika Becker (GER); Germany	4.55	Svetlana Feofanova (RUS); Russia	4.40	Dana Cervantes (ESP); Spain	4.30
Long jump	Tatyana Kotova (RUS); Russia	6.85	Maurren Maggi (BRA); Americas	6.81	Concepción Montaner (ESP); Spain	6.68
Triple jump	Françoise Mbango Etone (CMR); Africa	14.37	Ashia Hansen (GBR); Great Britain	14.32	Carlota Castrejana (ESP); Spain	14.13
Shot put	Irina Korzhanenko (RUS); Russia	20.20	Yumileidi Cumbá (CUB); Americas	19.14	Astrid Kumbernuss (GER); Germany	19.11
Discus throw	Beatrice Faumuina (NZL); Oceania	62.47	Ekaterini Voggoli (GRE); Europe	61.77	Natalya Sadova (RUS); Russia	61.30
Hammer throw	Gu Yuan (CHN); Asia	70.75	Yipsi Moreno (CUB); Americas	69.65	Olga Kuzenkova (RUS); Russia	66.98
Javelin throw	Osleidys Menéndez (CUB); Americas	64.41	Tatyana Shikolenko (RUS); Russia	60.11	Mikaela Ingberg (FIN); Europe	60.08

^{1} Marion Jones originally won this event in 10.90, but she was disqualified in 2007 after she admitted to drug use between 2000 and 2002.
^{2} The United States originally finished second in 42.05, but were disqualified in 2007 after Marion Jones admitted to drug use between 2000 and 2002.
^{3} The United States originally finished second in 3:24.67, but were disqualified in 2004 after Michelle Collins admitted to drug use between 2000 and 2002.
