= Sergio Hierrezuelo =

Cuban hurdler (born 1982)

Personal information
- Born: 15 March 1982 (age 44)

Sport
- Sport: Track and field
Medal record
Representing Cuba
World Youth Championships
Silver medal – second place	1999 Bydgoszcz	400m hurdles

Sergio Hierrezuelo Castellanos (born 15 March 1982) is a retired Cuban athlete who specialised in the 400 metres hurdles. He reached the semifinals of the 2005 World Championships. In addition, early in his career he won the silver medal at the 1999 World Youth Championships.

His personal best in the event is 49.11 seconds, set in 2005.

== Competition record ==
Year	Competition	Venue	Position	Event	Notes
Representing Cuba
1999	World Youth Championships	Bydgoszcz, Poland	2nd	400 m hrd (84.0 cm)	49.95
2002	Ibero-American Championships	Guatemala City, Guatemala	1st	400 m hurdles	50.60
2003	Central American and Caribbean Championships	St. George's, Grenada	2nd	400 m hurdles	50.26
2003	Pan American Games	Santo Domingo, Dom. Rep.	6th	400 m hurdles	50.34
2003	Pan American Games	Santo Domingo, Dom. Rep.	6th	4 × 400 m relay	3:06.27
2005	Central American and Caribbean Championships	Nassau, Bahamas	4th	400 m hurdles	49.66
2005	World Championships	Helsinki, Finland	17th (sf)	400 m hurdles	49.66
2007	Pan American Games	Rio de Janeiro, Brazil	10th (h)	400 m hurdles	49.90
2007	Pan American Games	Rio de Janeiro, Brazil	–	4 × 400 m relay	DQ
