= Athletics at the 2007 Pan American Games – Men's 400 metres hurdles =

Men's 400 metres hurdles at the Pan American Games

The men's 400 metres hurdles event at the 2007 Pan American Games was held on July 25–27.

== Medalists ==
Gold	Silver	Bronze
Adam Kunkel; Canada	Bayano Kamani; Panama	LaRon Bennett; United States

== Results ==
=== Heats ===
Qualification: First 2 of each heat (Q) and the next 2 fastest (q) qualified for the final.

Rank	Heat	Name	Nationality	Time	Notes
1	2	LaRon Bennett	United States	49.09	Q
2	3	Adam Kunkel	Canada	49.27	Q
3	3	Dean Griffiths	Jamaica	49.37	Q, SB
4	1	Félix Sánchez	Dominican Republic	49.42	Q
5	3	Javier Culson	Puerto Rico	49.46	q
6	1	Raphael Fernandes	Brazil	49.53	Q
7	2	Bayano Kamani	Panama	49.78	Q, SB
8	2	Mahau Suguimati	Brazil	49.83	q
9	2	Jonathan Williams	Belize	49.84	
10	2	Sergio Hierrezuelo	Cuba	49.90	SB
11	1	Yacnier Luis	Cuba	50.04	
12	3	Andrés Silva	Uruguay	50.60	
13	1	Allan Ayala	Guatemala	51.20	PB
14	1	Jonathan Gibson	Panama	51.31	PB
15	1	Steve Delice	Haiti	51.51	
16	3	Andretti Bain	Bahamas	51.53	
17	2	Luis Montenegro	Chile	51.58	
18	3	Jonnie Lowe	Honduras	53.05	
19	1	Mikel Thomas	Trinidad and Tobago	1:05.80	

=== Final ===
Rank	Lane	Name	Nationality	Time	Notes
1st place, gold medalist(s)	5	Adam Kunkel	Canada	48.24	NR
2nd place, silver medalist(s)	7	Bayano Kamani	Panama	48.70	SB
3rd place, bronze medalist(s)	4	LaRon Bennett	United States	49.07	
4	3	Félix Sánchez	Dominican Republic	49.28	
5	6	Dean Griffiths	Jamaica	49.30	SB
6	8	Javier Culson	Puerto Rico	49.46	
7	1	Mahau Suguimati	Brazil	49.63	
8	2	Raphael Fernandes	Brazil	51.76	
