= Adam Kunkel =

Canadian hurdler (born 1981)

Personal information
- Born: February 24, 1981 (age 45) Walkerton, Ontario, Canada

Sport
- Sport: Track and field
Medal record
Representing Canada
Pan American Games
Gold medal – first place	2007 Rio de Janeiro	110m hurdles

Adam Charles Kunkel (born February 24, 1981) is a male hurdler from Canada, who twice represented his native country at the Pan American Games: 2003 and 2007. He set his personal best (48.24) in the men's 400 m hurdles event on July 27, 2007 in Rio de Janeiro.

He was seventh at the 2003 Pan American Games and competed in the heats at the 2003 World Championships in Athletics. He took the 400 m hurdles gold at the 2007 Pan American Games and reached the final at the 2007 World Championships, although he failed to finish in the final.

== Achievements ==
Year	Competition	Venue	Position	Event	Notes
1999	Pan American Junior Championships	Tampa, United States	6th	400 m hurdles	52.63
2001	Jeux de la Francophonie	Ottawa, Canada	9th (h)	400 m hurdles	51.36
2002	NACAC U-25 Championships	San Antonio, Texas, United States	4th	400m hurdles	50.22
2002	NACAC U-25 Championships	San Antonio, Texas, United States	4th	4 × 100 m relay	40.03
2003	Pan American Games	Santo Domingo, Dominican Republic	7th	400 m hurdles	50.43
2003	World Championships	Paris, France	31st (h)	400 m hurdles	50.68
2007	Pan American Games	Rio de Janeiro, Brazil	1st	400 m hurdles	48.24
2007	World Championships	Osaka, Japan	9th (sf)	400 m hurdles	48.66 (Note: Did not finish in the final.)

== See also ==
- Canadian records in track and field
