= Kaaron =

Kaaron is a unisex given name. Notable people with the name include:

- Kaaron Conwright (born 1976), American sprinter
- Kaaron Warren, Australian writer
