= Jamial Rolle =

Bahamian sprinter (born 1980)

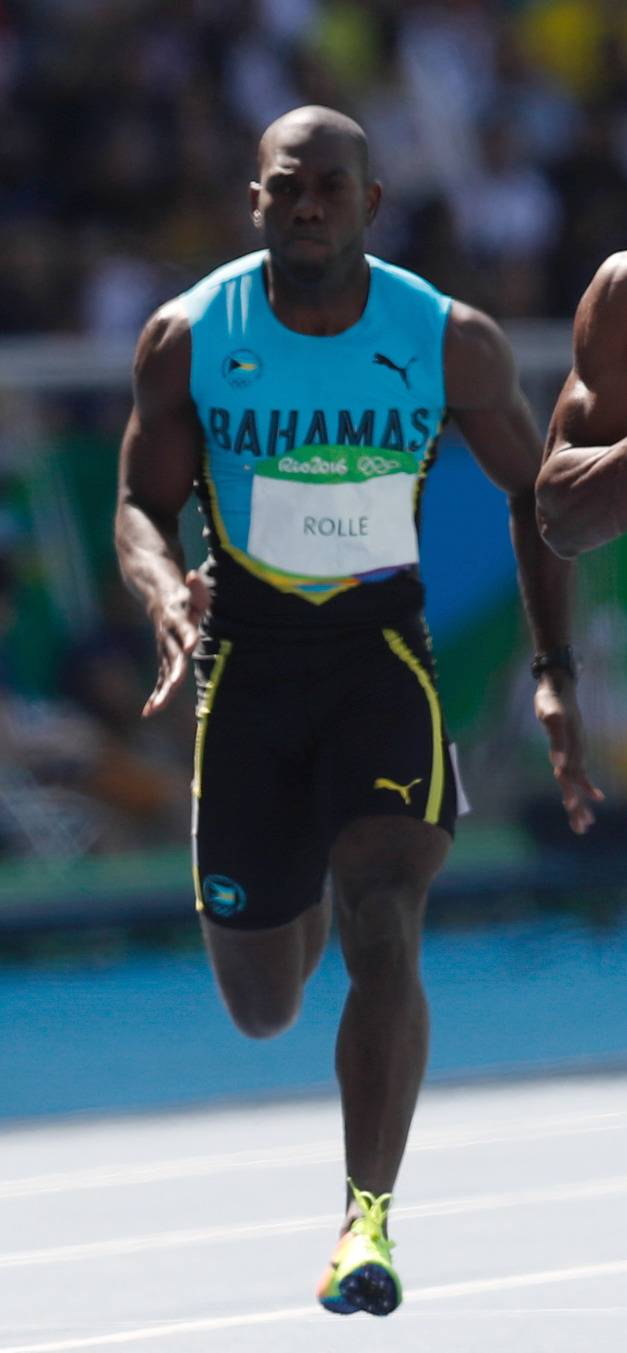
- Rolle at the 2016 Summer Olympics

Personal information
- Full name: Jamial St. John Rolle
- Born: 16 April 1980 (age 46) Nassau, Bahamas
- Height: 1.74 m (5 ft 9 in)
- Weight: 70 kg (154 lb)

Sport
- Country: Bahamas
- Sport: Athletics
- Event: Sprint
- College team: Missouri State
- Club: Doyle Management
Medal record
Men's athletics
Representing Bahamas
CAC Championships
Gold medal – first place	2001 Guatemala City	4×100 m relay
Gold medal – first place	2013 Morelia	4×100 m relay
Bronze medal – third place	2005 Nassau	4×100 m relay
- Updated on 14 December 2014

Jamial St. John Rolle (born 16 April 1980) is a Bahamian sprinter who specializes in the 200 metres.

Individually, he competed at the 2006 Commonwealth Games, but failed to progress past the quarterfinals. With the Bahamian 4 x 100 metres relay team he finished fourth at the 2003 Central American and Caribbean Championships and won a bronze medal at the 2005 Central American and Caribbean Championships.

His personal best times are 20.51 seconds in the 200 metres, and 10.26 seconds in the 100 metres.

Rolle ran for Missouri State University, winning the 2001 Missouri Valley Conference 200 meters indoor championship.

He teamed up with Adrian Griffith, Shavez Hart and Trevorvano Mackey to break the Bahamian 4×100 national record in Morelia, Mexico.

== Personal bests ==
=== Outdoor ===
- 100 m: 10.16 s (wind: +1.4 m/s) – Clermont, United States, 7 May 2016
- 200 m: 20.51 s (wind: +2.0 m/s) – Montverde, United States, 8 June 2013
- 400 m: 47.26 s – Fort Valley, United States, 25 February 2006
- Long jump: 7.59 m (wind: NWI) – Jonesboro, United States, 15 April 2000

== International competitions ==
Year	Competition	Venue	Position	Event	Notes
Representing the Bahamas
2001	Central American and Caribbean Championships	Guatemala City, Guatemala	1st	4 × 100 m relay	39.27 A
2002	Commonwealth Games	Manchester, United Kingdom	38th	100 m	10.99 (wind: +0.3 m/s)
2002	Commonwealth Games	Manchester, United Kingdom	21st (qf)	200 m	21.50 (wind: +0.5 m/s)
2002	NACAC U-25 Championships	San Antonio, United States	4th (h)	100 m	10.76 (wind: +1.2 m/s)
2002	NACAC U-25 Championships	San Antonio, United States	4th	200 m	21.06 (wind: +0.5 m/s)
2002	NACAC U-25 Championships	San Antonio, United States	2nd	4 × 100 m relay	39.81
2003	Central American and Caribbean Championships	St. George's, Grenada	10th (sf)	100 m	10.45 w (wind: +2.6 m/s)
2003	Central American and Caribbean Championships	St. George's, Grenada	4th	4 × 100 m relay	39.70
2003	Pan American Games	Santo Domingo, Dominican Republic	10th (sf)	200 m	21.14 (wind: +1.6 m/s)
2003	Pan American Games	Santo Domingo, Dominican Republic	5th	4 × 100 m relay	39.72
2005	Central American and Caribbean Championships	Nassau, Bahamas	9th (sf)	100 m	10.53 (wind: +0.5 m/s)
2005	Central American and Caribbean Championships	Nassau, Bahamas	3rd	4 × 100 m relay	39.08
2006	Commonwealth Games	Melbourne, Australia	20th (qf)	200 m	21.33 (wind: +0.2 m/s)
2006	Central American and Caribbean Games	Cartagena, Colombia	7th	100 m	10.52 (wind: +0.6 m/s)
2008	Central American and Caribbean Championships	Cali, Colombia	7th	200 m	20.90 A (wind: +0.5 m/s)
2008	Olympic Games	Beijing, China	5th (h)	200 m	20.93 (wind: -0.7 m/s)
2010	Central American and Caribbean Games	Mayagüez, Puerto Rico	11th (h)	200 m	21.06 w (wind: +2.6 m/s)
2010	Central American and Caribbean Games	Mayagüez, Puerto Rico	–	4 × 100 m	DQ
2010	Commonwealth Games	Delhi, India	6th (sf)	100 m	10.53 (wind: +0.9 m/s)
2010	Commonwealth Games	Delhi, India	5th (sf)	200 m	21.17 (wind: +0.4 m/s)
2010	Commonwealth Games	Delhi, India	5th	4 × 100 m	39.27
2011	Central American and Caribbean Championships	Mayagüez, Puerto Rico	–	100 m	DQ
2011	Central American and Caribbean Championships	Mayagüez, Puerto Rico	4th	4 × 100 m relay	39.46
2011	Pan American Games	Guadalajara, Mexico	11th (sf)	100 m	10.49 A (wind: +0.4 m/s)
2011	Pan American Games	Guadalajara, Mexico	6th (h)^{1}	4 × 100 m relay	40.05
2011	Pan American Games	Guadalajara, Mexico	6th (h)^{1}	4 × 400 m relay	3:09.68
2013	Central American and Caribbean Championships	Morelia, Mexico	1st	4 × 100 m relay	38.77 A
2013	World Championships	Moscow, Russia	44th (h)	200 m	21.40 (wind: +0.2 m/s)
2013	World Championships	Moscow, Russia	14th (h)	4 × 100 m relay	38.70
2014	Central American and Caribbean Games	Xalapa, Mexico	5th (h)	200 m	21.68 A (wind: +0.6 m/s)
2016	Olympic Games	Rio de Janeiro, Brazil	64th (h)	100 m	10.68

^{1}: Did not show in the final.
