= Shellene Williams =

Jamaican sprinter

Personal information
- Born: 19 February 1981 (age 45) Old Harbour, Jamaica

Sport
- Sport: Track and field
Medal record
Representing Jamaica
Pan American Games
Bronze medal – third place	2003 Santo Domingo	4x100 m relay
CAC Junior Championships (U20)
Gold medal – first place	1998 George Town	4×400 m relay
Gold medal – first place	2000 San Juan	4×400 m relay
CARIFTA Games Junior (U20)
Bronze medal – third place	2000 St. George's	400 m

Shellene Williams (born 19 February 1981) is a retired female track and field sprinter from Jamaica. She specialized in the 200 metres and the 400 metres. Her personal best time in the women's 200 metres was 23.50 seconds, achieved in May 2004, and her 400 m best was 51.94 seconds, set in June 2004. Williams won a bronze medal in the women's 4×100 metres relay at the 2003 Pan American Games, alongside Lacena Golding-Clarke, Judyth Kitson, and Danielle Browning.

Williams attended Barton Community College in Kansas, United States, and won an NJCAA title in the relay while there. She transferred to the University of Iowa in 2003 and won the Big Ten Conference 400 m title before reaching the semi-finals at the NCAA Women's Outdoor Track and Field Championship. The following year she took the indoor and outdoor Big Ten titles and placed sixth at the NCAA Outdoors, earning All-American honours for the Iowa Hawkeyes. She completed her degree in communication studies and later returned to her alma mater as an assistant sprints coach.

After finishing university, she competed professionally. She shared in the 4×400 metres relay gold medal at the 2005 Central American and Caribbean Championships in Athletics. At the 2006 IAAF World Indoor Championships she helped set a Jamaican indoor record of 3:29.54 minutes for the 4 × 400 m relay, placing fifth in the event as a result. She was part of the fourth-placed relay team at the Athletics at the 2006 Commonwealth Games.

She won several medals as a junior (under-19) athlete. She won gold with the 4 × 400 m relay team at the 1997 Pan American Junior Athletics Championships and the 1998 Central American and Caribbean Junior Championships in Athletics, and was the heats runner of the winning relay team at the 1998 World Junior Championships in Athletics. An individual 400 m bronze medal came at the 2000 CARIFTA Games, and at the 2000 CAC Juniors she was fourth in the 400 m and retained the relay title. In her last junior appearance, she helped Jamaica's relay team through the heats at the 2000 World Junior Championships in Athletics, where they eventually took silver behind Great Britain in the final. At the 2002 NACAC Under-25 Championships in Athletics she was the 200 m gold medallist, 4 × 400 m relay gold medallist, and the 4 × 100 m relay silver medallist.

== Achievements ==
Year	Competition	Venue	Position	Event	Notes
Representing Jamaica
1998	World Junior Championships	Annecy, France	3rd (h)	4 × 400 m relay	3:37.19
2000	World Junior Championships	Santiago, Chile	1st (h)	4 × 400 m relay	3:37.38
2002	NACAC U-25 Championships	San Antonio, Texas, United States	1st	200m	23.78 (wind: -0.3 m/s)
2002	NACAC U-25 Championships	San Antonio, Texas, United States	2nd	4 × 100 m relay	44.86
2002	NACAC U-25 Championships	San Antonio, Texas, United States	1st	4 × 400 m relay	3:34.06
2003	Pan American Games	Santo Domingo, Dominican Republic	3rd	4 × 100 m relay	43.71 s
