= Judith Méndez =

Dominican Republic heptathlete

Personal information
- Born: July 27, 1981 (age 44)

Sport
- Sport: Track and field
Medal record
Representing Dominican Republic
Central American and Caribbean Games
Silver medal – second place	2002 San Salvador	Heptathlon

Judith Méndez Volquez (born July 27, 1981) is a female heptathlete from the Dominican Republic.

== Competition record ==
Year	Competition	Venue	Position	Event	Notes
Representing the Dominican Republic
2000	Central American and Caribbean Junior Championships	San Juan, Puerto Rico	3rd	Heptathlon	4703 pts (w)
2000	World Junior Championships	Santiago, Chile	19th	Heptathlon	4265 pts
2002	Ibero-American Championships	Guatemala City, Guatemala	5th	Heptathlon	5009 pts
2002	NACAC U25 Championships	San Antonio, United States	3rd	Heptathlon	5014 pts
2002	Central American and Caribbean Games	San Salvador, El Salvador	2nd	Heptathlon	5261 pts
2003	Pan American Games	Santo Domingo, Dom. Rep.	4th	Heptathlon	5783 pts
