= Lansford Spence =

Jamaican sprinter (born 1982)

- Spence in 2008

Personal information
- Born: 15 December 1982 (age 43) Manchester Parish, Jamaica

Sport
- Sport: Track and field
- Club: Auburn Tigers
Medal record
Representing Jamaica
World Championships
Silver medal – second place	2003 Saint-Denis	4x400m relay
Bronze medal – third place	2005 Helsinki	4x400m relay
Bronze medal – third place	2011 Daegu	4x400m relay
Pan American Games
Gold medal – first place	2003 Santo Domingo	4x400m relay
Silver medal – second place	2011 Guadalajara	200m
Commonwealth Games
Silver medal – second place	2006 Melbourne	4x400m relay
Silver medal – second place	2010 Delhi	200m
Bronze medal – third place	2010 Delhi	4x100m relay
Central American and Caribbean Games
Silver medal – second place	2002 San Salvador	400m
Silver medal – second place	2002 San Salvador	4x400m relay

Lansford Spence (born 15 December 1982) is a Jamaican sprinter. Together with Sanjay Ayre, Brandon Simpson and Davian Clarke he won a bronze medal in 4 x 400 metres relay at the 2005 World Championships in Athletics. He also competed in the individual contest, but was knocked out in the semi-final. In 2006 the relay team won another bronze medal at the Commonwealth Games. He won a Commonwealth Games Silver medal in the 200m in 2010.

He was one of five athletes (along with Yohan Blake, Marvin Anderson, Allodin Fothergill and Sheri-Ann Brooks) who failed their doping tests at the 2009 Jamaican National Championships. All five tested positive for banned stimulant methylxanthine. Spence received a three-month doping ban for the infraction.

== Personal bests ==
- 200 metres - 20.33 Wind +0.5 (2011, done at altitude)
- 400 metres - 44.77 (2005)

== Achievements ==
Year	Competition	Venue	Position	Event	Notes
Representing Jamaica
2002	NACAC U-25 Championships	San Antonio, Texas, United States	6th	400m	47.06
2002	NACAC U-25 Championships	San Antonio, Texas, United States	2nd	4 × 400 m relay	3:05.19
2002	Central American and Caribbean Games	San Salvador, El Salvador	2nd	400 m	46.31
2002	Central American and Caribbean Games	San Salvador, El Salvador	2nd	4 × 400 m relay	3:01.81
2003	Pan American Games	Santo Domingo, DR	1st	4 × 400 m relay	3:02.02
2005	Central American and Caribbean Championships	Nassau, Bahamas	1st	400 m	45.29
2005	World Championships	Helsinki, Finland	3rd	4 × 400 m relay	2:58.07
2006	Commonwealth Games	Melbourne, Australia	8th	400 m	45.79
2006	Commonwealth Games	Melbourne, Australia	3rd	4 × 400 m relay	3:01.94
2007	NACAC Championships	San Salvador, El Salvador	2nd	4 × 400 m relay	3:04.32
2011	World Championships	Daegu, South Korea	3rd	4 × 400 m relay	3:00.10
2011	Pan American Games	Guadalajara, Mexico	2nd	200 m	20.38 (wind: -1.0 m/s)

== See also ==
- List of doping cases in athletics
