= Joey Woody =

American hurdler (born 1973)

Personal information
- Born: May 22, 1973 (age 53) Iowa City, Iowa, United States

Sport
- Sport: Track and field
Medal record
Representing United States
World Championships
Gold medal – first place	1999 Seville	4x400 m relay
Silver medal – second place	2003 Paris	400 m hurdles

Joey Woody (born May 22, 1973) is an American track and field athlete in the 400 meter hurdles event.

Woody attended Iowa City High School and the University of Northern Iowa, where he was the 1997 NCAA champion in the 400 m hurdles. Woody placed third in the USA Outdoor Track and Field Championships and qualified for the 1997 World Championships in Athens. In the 1999 World Championships in Seville, he improved to sixth place. In the 2000 US Olympic Trials, he placed fourth, therefore just missed qualifying for the 2000 Olympics. He again just missed qualifying for the 2004 Olympics.

Woody qualified for the 2003 World Championships in Paris and made it to the finals, winning the silver medal behind 2001 World Champion Félix Sánchez. This was the largest success of his running career.

Woody is now the Director of Track and Field and Cross Country at the University of Iowa.

== Career highlights ==
- 2003 World Championships: Silver medalist, 400 meter hurdles
- 1999 World Championships: 6th, 400 meter hurdles
- 1999 World Championships: Gold medalist, 4x400 meter relay (ran 2nd leg of semifinal)
- 1997 NCAA Champion
