= Dean Griffiths =

Jamaican sprinter (born 1980)

Personal information
- Born: 27 January 1980 (age 46) Saint Andrew Parish, Jamaica

Sport
- Sport: Track and field
Medal record
Athletics
Representing Jamaica
Pan American Games
| Bronze medal – third place | 2003 Santo Domingo | 400 m hurdles |
Central American and Caribbean Championships
| Gold medal – first place | 2005 Nassau | 400m hurdles |
CARIFTA Games Junior (U20)
| Silver medal – second place | 1999 Fort-de-France | 400m hurdles |

Dean Horace Griffiths (born 27 January 1980) is a male hurdler from Jamaica, who represented his native country at the 2004 Summer Olympics in Athens, Greece. He set his personal best (48.55) while winning the men's 400m hurdles at the NCAA Championship on 13 June 2003 in Sacramento, California and help Auburn University to a 2nd-place team finish. Also, in 2003 Griffiths was rank seventh best in the world over 400m hurdles and place 5th at the World Athletic Finals in Monaco.

Griffiths was coached by Henry Rolle

== Achievements ==
| Year | Competition | Venue | Position | Event | Notes |
Representing Jamaica
| 1999 | CARIFTA Games (U20) | Fort-de-France, Martinique | 2nd | 400m hurdles | 52.89 |
| 1999 | Pan American Junior Championships | Tampa, United States | 4th | 400m hurdles | 51.87 |
| 2002 | NACAC U-25 Championships | San Antonio, Texas, United States | 3rd | 400m hurdles | 50.06 |
| 2002 | NACAC U-25 Championships | San Antonio, Texas, United States | 2nd | 4 × 400 m relay | 3:05.19 |
| 2003 | Pan American Games | Santo Domingo, Dominican Republic | 3rd | 400m hurdles | 49.35 |
| 2003 | World Championships | Paris, France | 9th (sf) | 400m hurdles | 48.64 |
| 2004 | Summer Olympics | Athens, Greece | 21st (sf) | 400m hurdles | 49.51 |
| 2005 | Central American and Caribbean Championships | Nassau, The Bahamas | 1st | 400m hurdles | 48.89 |
| 2005 | World Championships | Helsinki, Finland | 11th (sf) | 400m hurdles | 48.89 |
| 2006 | Commonwealth Games | Melbourne, Australia | 6th | 400m hurdles | 49.85 |
| 2007 | Pan American Games | Rio de Janeiro, Brazil | 5th | 400m hurdles | 49.30 |
