= Richard James (sprinter, born 1979) =

Jamaican sprinter (born 1979)

Personal information
- Born: 1 December 1979 (age 46) Boston Beach, Portland, Jamaica
- Home town: Portland, Jamaica
- Education: Southwestern Christian College; LIU Brooklyn
- Height: 175 cm (5 ft 9 in)
- Weight: 75 kg (165 lb)

Sport
- Country: Jamaica
- Sport: Sport of athletics
- Event: 400 metres
- College team: Southwestern Christian College Rams; LIU Brooklyn Blackbirds

Achievements and titles
- National finals: 2002 Jamaican Champs; • 200m, 8th; 2003 NCAAs; • 400m, 8th; 2003 Jamaican Champs; • 400m, 8th; 2004 Jamaican Champs; • 400m, 4th
- Personal bests: 400m: 45.66 (2003); 400mH: 51.87 (2006); 800m: 1:52.89 (2000)
Medal record
Men's athletics
Representing Jamaica
World Indoor Championships
Gold medal – first place	2004 Budapest	4 × 400 m relay
NACAC Under-25 Championships
Bronze medal – third place	2002 San Antonio	4 × 100 m relay
Silver medal – second place	2002 San Antonio	4 × 400 m relay
Central American and Caribbean Championships
Silver medal – second place	2003 St. George's	4 × 400 m relay
- Updated on November 2024

Richard James (born 1 December 1979) is a Jamaican former sprinter specializing in the 400 metres and the 8th World Athletics Indoor Championships gold medallist in the 4 × 400 m relay. He was an All-American track and field runner for the LIU Brooklyn Blackbirds and won medals at the Central American and Caribbean Championships in Athletics and the NACAC Under-25 Championships in Athletics.

== Career ==
James achieved his first international championship experience at the 2002 NACAC Under-25 Championships in Athletics, where he entered in three events. In the 400 m, he qualified for the finals and finished 5th. He won a bronze medal anchoring the 4 × 100 m relay and won silver running 2nd leg of the 4 × 400 m, finishing only behind the United States.

Following a brief NJCAA career with the Southwestern Christian College Rams, James joined the LIU Brooklyn Blackbirds track and field team in the NCAA, where he broke several Northeast Conference track records. After not advancing from the heats of the 2002 NCAA Division I Outdoor Track and Field Championships, James qualified for the 2003 NCAA Division I Outdoor Championships 400 m final, where he placed 8th and was All American. At the 2003 Central American and Caribbean Championships in Athletics, James finished 5th in the 400 m and won another silver medal anchoring the 4 × 400 m relay.

James achieved his greatest international success at the 2004 IAAF World Indoor Championships, where he helped his Jamaican team to a gold medal by leading off their 4 × 400 m team to a heat win. In the finals, James and Sanjay Ayre were replaced by Gregory Haughton and Davian Clarke, and Jamaica won in a world-leading 3:05.21 clocking.

James qualified for three Jamaican Athletics Championships national finals in the 400 m, placing 8th at the 2002 and 2003 editions and achieving a best finish of 4th in 2004.

James was selected as part of the Jamaican relay team at the 2004 Summer Olympics, but he did not ultimately compete in the heats or finals of the Olympic 4 × 400 m.

== Personal life ==
James was born on 1 December 1979 in Boston Beach, Portland, Jamaica. He first attended Southwestern Christian College in Terrell, Texas before studying at LIU Brooklyn, where he graduated with a master's degree in exercise physiology in 2007.

After graduation, James became a performance director and adjunct sports science professor at LIU Brooklyn. In 2018, he became the Director of High Performance at Poly Prep in Brooklyn.

In his capacity as a coach, James has trained and worked with distance runner Julius Mutekanga and footballer Adam Ozeri.

While a professional athlete, James was sponsored by Puma.

== Statistics ==
=== Personal best progression ===
400m progression
#	Mark	Pl.	Competition	Venue	Date	Ref.
1	48.37	3rd place, bronze medalist(s)	Mets	New York, NY	2 Feb 2002	
2	48.23	(gold) (Heat 6-Coll)	Arm Inv	New York, NY	7 Feb 2002	
3	47.51	4th	IC4A	Boston, MA	2 Mar 2002	
4	47.01	(gold) (Round 2)	Duke Inv	Durham, NC	5 Apr 2002	
5	46.45	(gold) (Heat)	Northeast	Emmitsburg, MD	3 May 2002	
6	46.06	1st place, gold medalist(s)	Northeast	Emmitsburg, MD	4 May 2002	
7	45.96	2nd place, silver medalist(s)	IC4A	Princeton, NJ	17 May 2002	
8	45.91	1st place, gold medalist(s)	Northeast	Baltimore, MD	3 May 2003	
9	45.67	(bronze) (Heat 1)	NCAA	Sacramento, CA	11 Jun 2003	
10	45.66	5th (Semifinal 2)	NCAA	Sacramento, CA	12 Jun 2003	
