= Athletics at the 2003 Pan American Games – Men's 400 metres hurdles =

Men's 400 metres hurdles at the Pan American Games

The final of the Men's 400 metres Hurdles event at the 2003 Pan American Games took place on Wednesday August 6, 2003, with the heats staged a day earlier. Dominican Republic's Félix Sánchez set a new Pan American Games record in the final, clocking 48.19 seconds.

== Medalists ==
Gold	Félix Sánchez; Dominican Republic
Silver	Eric Thomas; United States
Bronze	Dean Griffiths; Jamaica

== Records ==
World Record	Kevin Young (USA)	46.78 s	August 6, 1992	Barcelona, Spain
Pan Am Record	Eronilde de Araújo (BRA)	48.23 s	July 28, 1999	Winnipeg, Canada

== Results ==
Rank	Athlete	Heats		Final
Rank	Athlete	Time	Rank	Time
1	Félix Sánchez (DOM)	48.99	2	48.19
2	Eric Thomas (USA)	48.91	1	48.74
3	Dean Griffiths (JAM)	49.08	3	49.35
4	Oscar Juanz (MEX)	50.31	7	50.28
5	Regan Nichols (USA)	50.01	5	50.31
6	Sergio Hierrezuelo (CUB)	50.37	8	50.34
7	Adam Kunkel (CAN)	50.00	4	50.43
8	Eronilde de Araújo (BRA)	50.21	6	51.19
9	Miguel García (DOM)	50.89	9	
10	Douglas Lynes-Bell (BAH)	51.12	10	
11	Shane Charles (GRN)	51.15	11	
12	Michael Aguilar (BIZ)	51.55	12	
13	Fitz Allan Crick (VIN)	51.83	13	
14	Damarius Cash (BAH)	53.54	14	
15	Jonnie Lowe (HON)	54.40	15	

== See also ==
- 2003 World Championships in Athletics – Men's 400 metres hurdles
- Athletics at the 2004 Summer Olympics – Men's 400 metre hurdles
