= Osbourne Moxey =

Bahamian long jumper

Personal information
- Born: 27 August 1978 (age 47)

Sport
- Sport: Track and field
Medal record
Representing Bahamas
CAC Junior Championships (U20)
Bronze medal – third place	1996 San Salvador	4x100 m relay
CARIFTA Games Junior (U20)
Bronze medal – third place	1994 Bridgetown	4x100m relay
Bronze medal – third place	1995 George Town	Long Jump
CARIFTA Games Youth (U17)
Bronze medal – third place	1994 Bridgetown	Long Jump

Osbourne Moxey (born 27 August 1978) is a male long jumper from the Bahamas. Osbourne has two children, Lauren and Landon. He is married to LaToya Moxey. In the Bahamas he graduated from St. Augustine's College where he received a scholarship to attend Auburn University, where he earned a degree in engineering.

Moxey was coached by Henry Rolle. He is known for the long jump event and competing at the Olympic Games.

Osbourne has five siblings: Beverton, Afton, Kendinique, Donavon, and Daron.

== Career ==
His personal best jump is 8.19 metres, achieved in August 2002 in San Antonio.

== Achievements ==
Year	Competition	Venue	Position	Event	Notes
Representing Bahamas
1994	CARIFTA Games (U-17)	Bridgetown, Barbados	7th	110 m hurdles (91.4 cm)	
1994	CARIFTA Games (U-17)	Bridgetown, Barbados	3rd	Long jump	6.56 m
1994	CARIFTA Games (U-17)	Bridgetown, Barbados	6th	Triple jump	13.16 m
1994	CARIFTA Games (U-20)	Bridgetown, Barbados	3rd	4 × 100 m relay	41.54
1995	CARIFTA Games (U-20)	George Town, Cayman Islands	3rd	Long jump	7.21 m
1996	CARIFTA Games (U-20)	Kingston, Jamaica	6th	Long jump	7.12 m
1996	Central American and Caribbean Junior Championships (U-20)	San Salvador, El Salvador	6th	Long jump	7.15 m
1996	Central American and Caribbean Junior Championships (U-20)	San Salvador, El Salvador	3rd	4 × 100 m relay	41.51
1997	CARIFTA Games (U-20)	Bridgetown, Barbados	4th	Long jump	7.16 m
2002	Commonwealth Games	Manchester, England	5th	Long jump	7.87 m
2002	NACAC U-25 Championships	San Antonio, Texas, United States	1st	Long jump	8.19 m (wind: +0.8 m/s)
2002	NACAC U-25 Championships	San Antonio, Texas, United States	2nd	4 × 100 m relay	39.81
2003	Central American and Caribbean Championships	St. George's, Grenada	2nd	Long jump	7.85 m w
2003	Pan American Games	Santo Domingo, Dominican Republic	5th	Long jump	7.93 m
2003	World Championships	Paris, France	8th	Long jump	7.93 m (0.5 m/s)
2004	Olympic Games	Athens, Greece	10th (q)	Long jump	7.81 m (-0.1 m/s)
2005	Central American and Caribbean Championships	Nassau, Bahamas	2nd	Long jump	8.03 m (3.5 m/s) w
2006	Commonwealth Games	Melbourne, Australia	12th	Long jump	7.36 m (0.4 m/s)
2006	Central American and Caribbean Games	Cartagena, Colombia	5th	Long jump	7.73 m (-1.5 m/s)
2007	Pan American Games	Rio de Janeiro, Brazil	5th	Long jump	7.81 m
2008	Central American and Caribbean Championships	Cali, Colombia	5th	Long jump	7.68 m (3.4 m/s) w
2009	Central American and Caribbean Championships	Havana, Cuba	1st	Long jump	7.96 m (0.0 m/s)
