= Athletics at the 2003 Pan American Games – Men's 4 × 400 metres relay =

Men's 4 × 400 metres relay at the Pan American Games

The men's 4 × 400 metres relay event at the 2003 Pan American Games was held on August 9.

== Results ==
Rank	Heat	Nation	Athletes	Time	Notes
1st place, gold medalist(s)	2	Jamaica	Michael Campbell, Sanjay Ayre, Lanceford Spence, Davian Clarke	3:01.81	
2nd place, silver medalist(s)	2	United States	Mitch Potter, Ja'Warren Hooker, Adam Steele, James Davis	3:01.87	
3rd place, bronze medalist(s)	2	Dominican Republic	Arismendy Peguero, Carlos Santa, Julio Vidal, Félix Sánchez	3:02.02	NR
4	2	Trinidad and Tobago	Jacey Harper, Sherridan Kirk, Jamil James, Damion Barry	3:05.28	
5	2	Bahamas	Andrae Williams, Dennis Darling, Timothy Munnings, Nathaniel McKinney	3:05.50	
6	2	Cuba	Glauder Garzón, Sergio Hierrezuelo, Alianni Hechevarría, Yeimer López	3:06.27	
7	2	Venezuela	Jonathan Palma, Simoncito Silvera, Luis Luna, William Hernández	3:06.52	
8	1	Grenada	Bruce Swan, Sheldon Noel, Shane Charles, Alleyne Francique	3:09.50	
9	1	Ecuador	Cristian Gutiérrez, Andrés Gallegos, Luis Morán, Cristian Matute	3:21.42	
	1	Belize		DNS	
