= Eric Thomas (hurdler) =

American hurdler (1973–2022)

Personal information
- Born: December 1, 1973 Garrison, Texas, U.S.
- Died: December 30, 2022 (aged 49) Houston, Texas, U.S.

Sport
- Country: United States
- Sport: Track and field
- Event: 400 m hurdles
- College team: Blinn College
- Turned pro: 1995
- Retired: 2007
Medal record
Men's athletics
Representing the United States
Olympic Games
Pan American Games
Silver medal – second place	2003 Santo Domingo	400 m hurdles
Silver medal – second place	1999 Winnipeg	400 m hurdles

Eric Ashley Thomas (December 1, 1973 – December 30, 2022) was an American hurdler who represented his native country at the 2000 Summer Olympics in Sydney, Australia. He set his personal best (47.94) in the men's 400 m hurdles event on June 13, 2000, in Rome, Italy.

== Achievements ==
Year	Competition	Venue	Position	Notes
1994	NJCAA	Blinn College	1st	400 m hurdles
1996	Olympic Trials	Atlanta, Georgia	4th	400 m hurdles
1999	Pan American Games	Winnipeg, Canada	2nd	400 m hurdles
2000	Summer Olympics	Sydney, Australia	9th	400 m hurdles
2003	Pan American Games	Santo Domingo, Dominican Republic	2nd	400 m hurdles
2003	World Championships	Paris, France	14th	400 m hurdles

== Later life and death ==
Eric Thomas founded Champion Trainers, LLC in 2005 to train young athletes for success in their chosen sports activities. Champion Trainers provides individualized fitness and athletic programs to improve endurance, speed, agility, flexibility, mechanics and overall performance.

Thomas died on December 30, 2022, at the age of 49.

== Charity ==
The Eric Thomas Foundation, a 501(c) (3) non-profit charitable organization, was organized to raise scholarship funds for youth who wish to pursue higher education and to improve the health and fitness of Texas youths. The Eric Thomas Foundation seeks to target high school athletes or students who would otherwise be unable to acquire financial assistance and support, and will make the dream of obtaining higher education a reality. The Eric Thomas Scholarship was presented to its first recipient at Garrison High School on May 17, 2011.
