= 2005 Central American and Caribbean Championships in Athletics =

20th Central American and Caribbean Championships
- Dates: 8–11 July
- Host city: Nassau, Bahamas (The Bahamas)
- Venue: Thomas Robinson Stadium
- Level: Senior
- Events: 44
- Participation: 374 athletes from 29 nations
- Records set: 15

The 2005 Central American and Caribbean Championships in athletics were held at the Thomas Robinson Stadium in Nassau, Bahamas, between 8–11 July 2005.

== Medal summary ==
=== Men's events ===
Event	Gold		Silver		Bronze	
100 metres	Darrel Brown; Trinidad and Tobago	10.02 CR	Marc Burns; Trinidad and Tobago	10.02	Churandy Martina; Netherlands Antilles	10.1
200 metres	Usain Bolt; Jamaica	20.03 CR	Aaron Armstrong; Trinidad and Tobago	20.35	Dominic Demeritte; Bahamas	20.47
400 metres	Lansford Spence; Jamaica	45.29	Ato Modibo; Trinidad and Tobago	45.46	Chris Brown; Bahamas	45.57
800 metres	Yeimer López; Cuba	1:47.64	Sherridan Kirk; Trinidad and Tobago	1:48.31	Moise Joseph; Haiti	1:49.60
1500 metres	Maury Castillo; Cuba	3:47.89	David Freeman; Puerto Rico	3:48.01	Luis Soto; Puerto Rico	3:52.60
5000 metres	Juan Luis Barrios; Mexico	14:22.57	Juan Carlos Romero; Mexico	14:36.18	Liván Luque; Cuba	14:38.02
10000 metres	Aguelmis Rojas; Cuba	30:14.75	Juan Carlos Romero; Mexico	30:41.87	Henry Ortíz; Cuba	31:38.63
3000 metres steeplechase	Alex Greaux; Puerto Rico	8:56.15	José Alberto Sánchez; Cuba	9:07.44	Salvador Miranda; Mexico	9:11.67
110 metres hurdles	Yoel Hernández; Cuba	13.32w	Dayron Robles; Cuba	13.41w	Alleyne Lett; Grenada	13.49w
400 metres hurdles	Dean Griffiths; Jamaica	48.99 CR	Yacnier Luis; Cuba	49.12	Lueroy Colquhoun; Jamaica	49.23
High jump	Víctor Moya; Cuba	2.26	Lisvany Pérez; Cuba	2.26	Gerardo Martínez; Mexico	2.23
Pole vault	Lázaro Borges; Cuba	4.80	Abiexer Vega; Puerto Rico	4.80	Steven Marrero; Puerto Rico	4.40
Long jump	Leevan Sands; Bahamas	8.13 =CR	Osbourne Moxey; Bahamas	8.03w	Ibrahim Camejo; Cuba	7.88
Triple jump	Yoandri Betanzos; Cuba	17.33w	Allen Simms; Puerto Rico	17.19w	Leevan Sands; Bahamas	17.14w
Shot put	Dorian Scott; Jamaica	20.21 CR	Alexis Paumier; Cuba	19.06	Yoisel Toledo; Cuba	18.28
Discus throw	Yunior Lastre; Cuba	60.10	Loy Martínez; Cuba	59.35	Héctor Hurtado; Venezuela	55.05
Hammer throw	Yosvany Suárez; Cuba	69.47	Erick Jiménez; Cuba	68.42	Santos Vega; Puerto Rico	64.53
Javelin throw	Emeterio González; Cuba	76.44	Yudel Moreno; Cuba	73.95	Justin Cummins; Barbados	61.92
Decathlon	Claston Bernard; Jamaica	7877 CR	Alberto Juantorena Jr. Cuba	7672	Alexis Chivás; Cuba	7624
20000 m track walk †	Julio Martínez; Guatemala	1:30:38.07	Gabriel Ortiz; Mexico	1:32:46.32	Walter Sandoval; El Salvador	1:37:38.64
4 × 100 metres relay	Trinidad and Tobago; Darrel Brown; Aaron Armstrong; Marc Burns; Jacey Harper; Kevon Pierre*	38.47 CR	Netherlands Antilles; Geronimo Goeloe; Charlton Raffaela; Jairo Duzant; Churandy Martina	38.92	Bahamas; Jamial Rolle; Dominic Demeritte; Grafton Ifill; Derrick Atkins; Troy McIntosh*	39.08
4 × 400 metres relay	Bahamas; Aaron Cleare, Andrae Williams, Nathaniel McKinney, Chris Brown	3:01.08	Trinidad and Tobago; Ato Stephens, Renny Quow, Sherridan Kirk, Damion Barry	3:01.43	Cuba; William Collazo, Dayron Martínez, Glaudel Garzón, Yeimer López	3:02.33

=== Women's events ===
Event	Gold		Silver		Bronze	
100 metres	Chandra Sturrup; Bahamas	11.02 CR	Tahesia Harrigan; British Virgin Islands	11.29	Fana Ashby; Trinidad and Tobago	11.40
200 metres	Cydonie Mothersille; Cayman Islands	22.26w	Christine Amertil; Bahamas	22.64w	Peta-Gaye Dowdie; Jamaica	22.72w
400 metres	Tonique Williams-Darling; Bahamas	50.97	Tiandra Ponteen; Saint Kitts and Nevis	51.41	Lisvania Grenot; Cuba	51.53
800 metres	Neisha Bernard-Thomas; Grenada	2:01.07	Aneita Denton; Jamaica	2:01.66	Yuneisi Santiusti; Cuba	2:02.38
1500 metres	Yadira Bataille; Cuba	4:26.43	Ashley Couper; Bermuda	4:26.91	Yanisleidis Castillo; Cuba	4:30.83
5000 metres	Yudelkis Martínez; Cuba	17:12.58	Angélica Sánchez; Mexico	17:15.00	Yanisleidis Castillo; Cuba	17:32.37
10000 metres	Yudelkis Martínez; Cuba	34:53.50	Mariela González; Cuba	35:09.62	Angélica Sánchez; Mexico	36:36.79
3000 metre steeplechase	Mardea Hyman; Jamaica	9:54.01 CR	Korene Hinds; Jamaica	9:58.05	only 2 athletes started the race	
100 metres hurdles	Nadine Faustin; Haiti	12.83	Andrea Bliss; Jamaica	12.86	Yahumara Neyra; Cuba	13.09
400 metres hurdles	Debbie-Ann Parris; Jamaica	55.26	Andrea Blackett; Barbados	56.47	Shevon Stoddart; Jamaica	56.64
High jump	Levern Spencer; Saint Lucia	1.94 CR	Karen Beautle; Jamaica; Juana Arrendel; Dominican Republic	1.85		
Pole vault †	Katiuska Pérez; Cuba	4.25 (CR)	Denisse Orengo; Puerto Rico	4.10	Marjorie Sánchez; Cuba	4.00
Long jump	Yargelis Savigne; Cuba	6.88w	Elva Goulbourne; Jamaica	6.78w	Jackie Edwards; Bahamas	6.71w
Triple jump	Yarianna Martínez; Cuba	14.18 CR	Mabel Gay; Cuba	13.97	Jennifer Arveláez; Venezuela	13.09
Shot put	Yumileidi Cumbá; Cuba	18.98 CR	Cleopatra Borel-Brown; Trinidad and Tobago	18.05	Kimberly Barrett; Jamaica	18.03
Discus throw	Yarelis Barrios; Cuba	56.59	Lisandra Rodríguez; Cuba	53.07	Chafree Bain; Bahamas	47.36
Hammer throw	Candice Scott; Trinidad and Tobago	67.44 CR	Yunaika Crawford; Colombia	66.75	Natalie Grant; Jamaica	61.34
Javelin throw	Laverne Eve; Bahamas	61.11	Olivia McKoy; Jamaica	61.10	Noraida Bicet; Cuba	59.05
Heptathlon	Juana Castillo; Dominican Republic	5760	Yasmiani Pedroso; Cuba	5479	Cheilín Povea; Cuba	5285
10000 m track walk	Cristina López; El Salvador	45:52.32 CR	Evelyn Núnez; Guatemala	47:23.58	Yarelis Sánchez; Cuba	50:57.73
4 × 100 metres relay	Jamaica; Danielle Browning; Sheri-Ann Brooks; Beverly McDonald; Peta-Gaye Dowdie	43.21	Bahamas; Tamicka Clarke; Philippa Arnette-Willie; Savatheda Fynes; Chandra Sturrup	43.48	Cuba; Yaumara Neira; Roxana Díaz; Misleidys Lazo; Yenima Arencibia	45.07
4 × 400 metres relay	Jamaica; Moya Thompson; Sonita Sutherland; Shellene Williams; Allison Beckford	3:30.63	Bahamas; Sasha Rolle; Christine Amertil; Shakeitha Henfield; Tonique Williams-Darling	3:33.14	Cuba; Indira Terrero; Yaniuska Pérez; Yadira Isaac; Libania Grenot	3:33.85

† = non-championship event

== Medal table ==
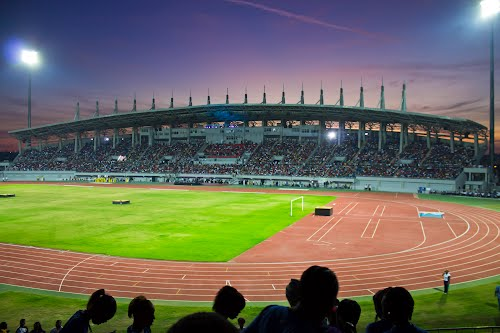
Host venue, Tommy Robinson National Stadium

* Host nation (Bahamas)

Rank	Nation	Gold	Silver	Bronze	Total
1	Cuba (CUB)	18	13	17	48
2	Jamaica (JAM)	9	6	5	20
3	Bahamas (BAH)*	5	4	6	15
4	Trinidad and Tobago (TTO)	3	6	1	10
5	Mexico (MEX)	1	4	3	8
5	Puerto Rico (PUR)	1	4	3	8
7	Dominican Republic (DOM)	1	1	0	2
7	Guatemala (GUA)	1	1	0	2
9	El Salvador (ESA)	1	0	1	2
9	Grenada (GRN)	1	0	1	2
9	Haiti (HAI)	1	0	1	2
12	Cayman Islands (CAY)	1	0	0	1
12	Saint Lucia (LCA)	1	0	0	1
14	Barbados (BAR)	0	1	1	2
14	Netherlands Antilles (AHO)	0	1	1	2
16	Bermuda (BER)	0	1	0	1
16	British Virgin Islands (IVB)	0	1	0	1
16	Colombia (COL)	0	1	0	1
16	Saint Kitts and Nevis (SKN)	0	1	0	1
20	Venezuela (VEN)	0	0	2	2
Totals (20 entries)		44	45	42	131

== Participating nations ==
- Anguilla (2)
- Antigua and Barbuda (4)
- Aruba (2)
- Bahamas (43)
- Barbados (19)
- Belize (1)
- Bermuda (6)
- British Virgin Islands (6)
- Cayman Islands (5)
- Cuba (67)
- Dominica (3)
- Dominican Republic (24)
- Grenada (4)
- Guatemala (12)
- Guyana (1)
- Haiti (14)
- Jamaica (45)
- Mexico (22)
- Montserrat (2)
- Netherlands Antilles (5)
- Puerto Rico (26)
- Saint Kitts and Nevis (10)
- Saint Lucia (1)
- Saint Vincent and the Grenadines (2)
- El Salvador (6)
- Turks and Caicos Islands (5)
- Trinidad and Tobago (26)
- United States Virgin Islands (7)
- Venezuela (4)

== See also ==
- 2005 in athletics (track and field)
