= Aldwyn Sappleton =

Jamaican track and field athlete (born 1981)

Personal information
- Nationality: Jamaica
- Born: 21 December 1981 (age 44) Saint Ann Parish, Jamaica
- Height: 1.89 m (6 ft 2 in)
- Weight: 74 kg (163 lb)

Sport
- Sport: Athletics
- Event: 800 metres
- Team: Oklahoma Sooners (USA)

Achievements and titles
- Personal best: 800 m: 1:46.82
Medal record
Men's athletics
Representing Jamaica
CARIFTA Games Youth (U17)
Gold medal – first place	1999 Fort-de-France	1500 m
Silver medal – second place	1999 Fort-de-France	800 m
Silver medal – second place	1999 Fort-de-France	4×400 m

Aldwyn Sappleton (born 21 December 1981, in Saint Ann Parish) is a Jamaican track and field athlete, who specialized in middle distance running. He won three medals, including gold in the 1500 metres, at the 1999 CARIFTA Games in Fort-de-France, Martinique. He is also a four-time All-American track and field athlete, while playing for the Oklahoma Sooners, at the University of Oklahoma in Norman.

Sappleton represented Jamaica at the 2008 Summer Olympics in Beijing, and competed in the men's 800 metres. He ran in the seventh heat of the event, against seven other competitors, including Netherlands' Robert Lathouwers, and Andrew Wheating of the United States. Sappleton finished the race in sixth place, with a time of 1:48.19, failing to advance into the semi-final rounds.
