= Crystal Cox =

American track and field athlete

Personal information
- Born: Crystal Shinelle Cox; March 28, 1979 (age 47) Norfolk, Virginia, U.S.

Crystal Shinelle Cox (born March 28, 1979) is an American track and field athlete who was on the national team at the 2004 Athens Summer Olympics and appeared as a contestant on the seventeenth season of the reality series Survivor.

== Career ==
Cox was an All-American sprinter for the North Carolina Tar Heels track and field team, finishing 8th in the 4 × 100 m at the 1998 NCAA Division I Outdoor Track and Field Championships.

She won a gold medal in the women's 4x400 m relay at the 2004 Athens Summer Olympics. She was later stripped of the gold in 2012 after she admitted to doping. In Athens she ran in the preliminary round but not in the final. DeeDee Trotter, Monique Henderson, Sanya Richards and Monique Hennagan ran in the final. In 2004, she was the American indoor 200 m champion.

On January 29, 2010, the Associated Press and ESPN.com reported that Cox admitted to using anabolic steroids from 2001 to 2004. As a result, she forfeited all of her results from that time period, and agreed to a four-year suspension that ended in January 2014. The IAAF has recommended that the whole U.S. women's 2004 Olympic 4x400 metres relay team be stripped of their medals. In 2013, both the IAAF and the IOC announced that the American squad (except Cox) would be allowed to retain their gold medals.

== Survivor ==
Cox was one of the contestants in Survivor: Gabon, which premiered in fall 2008. Cox's tribe lost 11 of the 13 tribal challenges, though she made it to the final six. Her main alliance consisted of Kenny Hoang, Jessica "Sugar" Kiper, Susie Smith, and Matty Whitmore. On the December 11, 2008, episode, Cox was voted out and became the fifth member of the jury.

In May 2023, Cox competed as a celebrity tribe captain in the second season of the NMB Celebrity Survivor Challenge. She reached the final tribal council and tied as the runner-up.
