= Félix Sánchez (hurdler) =

Dominican-American track & field athlete (born 1977)

Félix Sánchez OLY
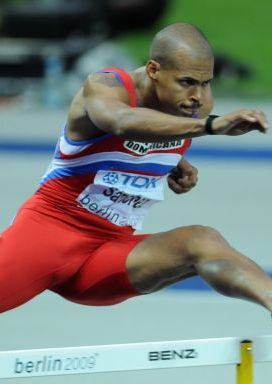
- Félix Sánchez at the 2009 World Championships in Athletics in Berlin

Personal information
- Born: August 30, 1977 (age 49) New York City, United States
- Years active: 1999–2016
- Height: 1.78 m (5 ft 10 in)
- Weight: 73 kg (161 lb)

Sport
- Sport: Running
- Events: 400 meter hurdles, 4 × 400 meters relay
- College team: USC Trojans

Achievements and titles
- Personal bests: Outdoor 100m: 10.45 (Los Angeles, 2005); 200m: 20.87 (Irvine, 2001); 400m: 44.90 (Gateshead, 2001); 400mH: 47.25 NR (Saint-Denis, 2003); 800m: 1:48.99 (Los Angeles, 2012); Indoor; 400m: 46.68 (Glasgow, 2001) 500m: 1:05.00 (Iowa, 2001)
Medal record
Men's athletics
Representing the Dominican Republic
Olympic Games
Gold medal – first place	2004 Athens	400 m hurdles
Gold medal – first place	2012 London	400 m hurdles
World Championships
Gold medal – first place	2001 Edmonton	400 m hurdles
Gold medal – first place	2003 Paris	400 m hurdles
Silver medal – second place	2007 Osaka	400 m hurdles
Pan American Games
Gold medal – first place	2003 Santo Domingo	400 m hurdles
Bronze medal – third place	2003 Santo Domingo	4 × 400 m relay
Bronze medal – third place	2007 Rio de Janeiro	4 × 400 m relay
Bronze medal – third place	2011 Guadalajara	400 m hurdles
CAC Championships
Bronze medal – third place	2013 Morelia	4 × 400 m relay

Félix Sánchez (born August 30, 1977) is a retired Dominican-American track and field athlete. Specializing in the 400 meter hurdles, He is a two-time Olympic gold medallist, winning gold in 2004 and 2012, and was also World Champion in 2001 and 2003. Just before turning 36, he set the Masters M35 World Record with a time of 48.10. Sanchez acquired many nicknames: "Super Felix", "the Invincible", "Superman", and "the Dictator".

The Félix Sánchez Olympic Stadium, Dominican Republic's largest stadium, is named after him.

Sánchez retired in April 2016, citing the recent birth of his son.

== Early life and college ==
Sánchez was born in New York City to Dominican-born parents and was raised in San Diego, California. He attended University City High School and San Diego Mesa College in the city, and then went on to study psychology at the University of Southern California in 1998. Competing for University of Southern California's USC Trojans, he was a Pac-10 champion (400 m hurdles) and All-American relay champion (1600 m) in 1999.

== Professional career ==
Sánchez opted to represent the Dominican Republic internationally, and made his debut for that nation in the Pan American games in 1999. Between 2001 and 2004 he won 43 races in a row at 400 m hurdles, including the 2001 and 2003 World Championships. He won a share of the Golden League million dollar-jackpot in 2002 after winning all 7 races.

At the 2003 Pan American Games, Sánchez won the Dominican Republic's first gold medal at the competition and also broke the Pan American Games record in the 400 m hurdles. He was named Track and Field News Track & Field Athlete of the Year in 2003. Subsequently, he won the first ever Olympic gold medal for the Dominican Republic on August 28, 2004, during the 2004 Summer Olympics in Athens, Greece.

During his 43-race winning streak, from 2001 to 2004, Sánchez was known for wearing a wristband while competing. The red flashing wristband, a souvenir from the 2000 Olympics, served as a motivation for him after failing to advance to the final in Sydney. After winning the Olympic gold medal in Athens 2004, Sánchez gave the wristband to the IAAF for auction and the profits were donated to charity. In his first race after the Olympics – and his first race without the wristband – at the Van Damme Memorial meet in Brussels, Sánchez injured his leg and had to abandon the race halfway through.

In 2012, at the age of 34, Sánchez entered the 2012 Summer Olympics. He posted the fastest qualifying time, and won the final with a time of 47.63 seconds, the same as his winning time in Athens in 2004 and his fastest run for eight years. Sánchez became the oldest man to win the Olympic 400m hurdles title. He was the only Olympic medalist for the Dominican Republic until 45 minutes after his second gold medal, when Luguelín Santos picked up a silver medal in the 400 metres. For his performance in London, Sanchez was awarded the Laureus World Comeback of the Year.

Sánchez announced his retirement in April 2016 at the age of 38, citing the recent birth of a son. He did not compete in the 2016 Olympics in Rio de Janeiro.

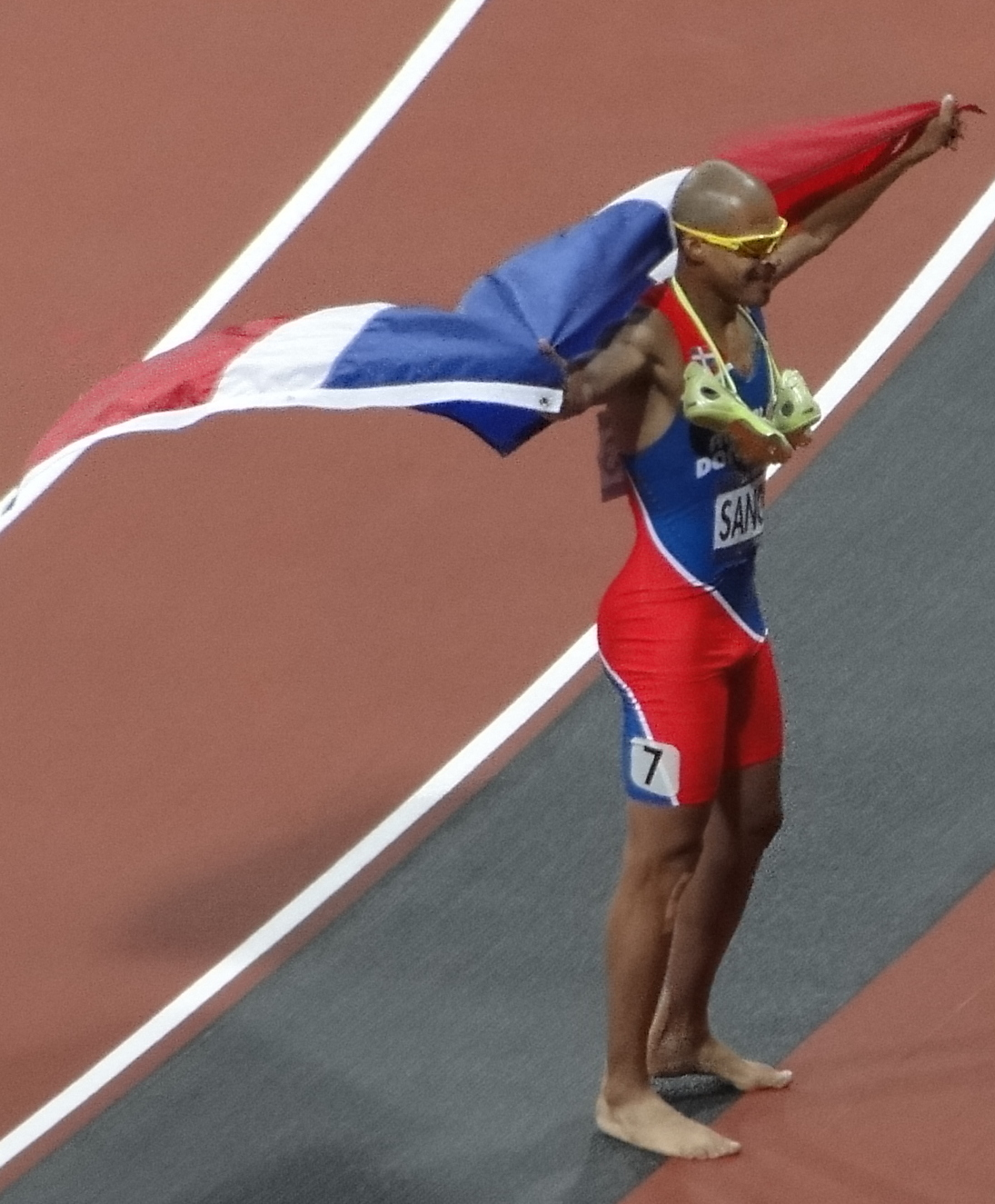
Sánchez at the 2012 London Olympics

== Competition record ==
Representing Dominican Republic
Year	Competition	Venue	Position	Event	Notes
1999	Pan American Games	Winnipeg, Canada	4th	400 m hurdles	48.60
1999	Pan American Games	Winnipeg, Canada	6th	4 × 400 m relay	3:05.19
1999	World Championships	Seville, Spain	23rd (h)	400 m hurdles	49.67
2000	Olympic Games	Sydney, Australia	20th (sf)	400 m hurdles	49.69
2001	World Indoor Championships	Lisbon, Portugal	8th (sf)	400 m	47.29
2001	World Championships	Edmonton, Canada	1st	400 m hurdles	47.49
2001	Goodwill Games	Brisbane, Australia	1st	400 m hurdles	48.47
2002	Central American and Caribbean Games	San Salvador, El Salvador	1st	4 × 400 m relay	3:04.15
2003	Pan American Games	Santo Domingo, Dominican Republic	1st	400 m hurdles	48.19
2003	Pan American Games	Santo Domingo, Dominican Republic	3rd	4 × 400 m relay	3:02.02
2003	World Championships	Paris, France	1st	400 m hurdles	47.25
2003	World Championships	Paris, France	–	4 × 400 m relay	DQ
2004	Olympic Games	Athens, Greece	1st	400 m hurdles	47.63
2005	World Championships	Helsinki, Finland	8th	400 m hurdles	DNF
2006	Central American and Caribbean Games	Cartagena, Colombia	4th	400 m hurdles	50.45
2006	Central American and Caribbean Games	Cartagena, Colombia	3rd	4 × 400 metres relay	3:03.25
2007	Pan American Games	Rio de Janeiro, Brazil	4th	400 m hurdles	49.28
2007	Pan American Games	Rio de Janeiro, Brazil	3rd	4 × 400 m relay	3:02.48
2007	World Championships	Osaka, Japan	2nd	400 m hurdles	48.01
2007	World Championships	Osaka, Japan	7th	4 × 400 m relay	3:03.56
2008	Olympic Games	Beijing, China	22nd (h)	400 m hurdles	51.10
2009	Central American and Caribbean Championships	Havana, Cuba	2nd	400 m hurdles	48.85
2009	World Championships	Berlin, Germany	8th	400 m hurdles	50.11
2009	World Championships	Berlin, Germany	6th	4 × 400 m relay	3:02.47
2010	World Indoor Championships	Doha, Qatar	3rd (h)	4 × 400 m relay	3:06.30 (iNR)
2010	Central American and Caribbean Games	Mayagüez, Puerto Rico	4th	400 m hurdles	50.08
2011	Central American and Caribbean Championships	Mayagüez, Puerto Rico	2nd	400 m hurdles	49.41
2011	World Championships	Daegu, South Korea	4th	400 m hurdles	48.87
2011	Pan American Games	Guadalajara, Mexico	3rd	400 m hurdles	48.85
2012	Olympic Games	London, United Kingdom	1st	400 m hurdles	47.63
2012	Olympic Games	London, United Kingdom	–	4 × 400 m relay	DQ
2013	Central American and Caribbean Championships	Morelia, Mexico	3rd	4 × 400 m relay	3:02.82
2013	World Championships	Moscow, Russia	5th	400 m hurdles	48.22
2015	NACAC Championships	San José, Costa Rica	5th	400 m hurdles	50.23

Sporting positions
Preceded by Angelo Taylor	Men's 400 m Hurdles Best Year Performance; 2001–2004	Succeeded by Kerron Clement
Awards
Preceded by	CAC Male Athlete of the Year; 2004	Succeeded by Asafa Powell
Olympic Games
Preceded by Francia Jackson	Flagbearer for Dominican Republic; Beijing 2008	Succeeded by Gabriel Mercedes
