= Carey Ryan =

American psychologist

Carey S. Ryan
- Education: University of Nebraska–Lincoln; University of Nebraska Omaha; University of Colorado-Boulder
- Scientific career
- Fields: Social psychology
- Institutions: University of Nebraska Omaha
- Thesis: Social support services for individuals with severe disabling mental illness: Case management and rehabilitation (1989)
- Doctoral advisor: John R. Forward

Carey S. Ryan is an American psychologist and professor emerita of psychology at the University of Nebraska Omaha. She was also editor-in-chief of the Journal of Social Issues from 2017 to 2020. Topics that she has researched include differences between Americans and the Japanese concerning perceptions of autonomy.
