= Kaaron Conwright =

American sprinter (born 1976)

Personal information
- Born: August 8, 1976 (age 50) Los Angeles, California, United States

Sport
- Sport: Track and field
Medal record
Representing United States
Summer Universiade
| Gold medal – first place | 1999 Palma de Mallorca | 4x100m relay |
| Silver medal – second place | 2001 Beijing | 4x100m relay |

Kaaron Conwright (born August 8, 1976) is a former American sprinter who specialized in the 100-metre dash.

== Early life and collegiate records ==
Conwright graduated from Westchester High School in Los Angeles.

As a sprinter at Cal Poly in San Luis Obispo, Conwright was a three-time NCAA All-American in the 100m and a two-time All-American in the 200m. In the Big West Conference, he was a four-time champion in the 100m from the years of 1996 through 2000, and he still holds the conference championship-meet record at 10.12 seconds. He later went on to run a 10.10 at the national championships that same year. He was also a two-time BWC champion in the 200m.

Conwright also played two seasons of football for Cal Poly, competing as a wide receiver and kick returner in 1995 (averaging 20.1 yards) and then defensive back in 1996 (making 19 tackles and two interceptions).

== International success ==
In 1999, Conwright ran first leg on the gold medal-winning 4-by-100m relay at the World University Games in Palma De Mallorca, Spain. In 2001, he repeated his performance, running first leg on the silver medal-winning 400m relay at the World University Games in Beijing, China.

At the 2002 IAAF World Cup, Conwright won the 4-by-100 metre relay race together with Jon Drummond, Jason Smoots and Coby Miller. At the 2006 IAAF World Cup, he won the relay again, this time with Wallace Spearmon, Tyson Gay and Smoots, in a championship record of 37.59 seconds.

Conwright's personal-best time in the 100-metre dash was 10.05 seconds, achieved in July 2000 in Flagstaff. His personal-best time over 60 metres is 6.61 seconds, achieved in March 2003 in Boston. In the 200 metres, he ran 20.59 seconds, achieved in July 2002 in Rome.

== Coaching ==
Conwright later served as head sprint coach for the National Korean Federation from 2007 through 2008 and then became an assistant coach under Olympian and Olympic Coach John Smith.
