= Jason Smoots =

American sprinter

Personal information
- Nationality: American
- Born: July 13, 1980 (age 45) Gadsden, Alabama
- Height: 6 ft 0 in (1.83 m)
- Weight: 187 lb (85 kg)

Sport
- Sport: Running
- Event(s): 100 meters, 200 meters

Jason Smoots (born July 13, 1980) is an American sprinter who specializes in the 100 metres.

At the 2002 IAAF World Cup he won the 4 x 100 metres relay race together with Jon Drummond, Kaaron Conwright and Coby Miller. At the 2006 IAAF World Cup he won the 4 x 100 metres relay again, this time with Kaaron Conwright, Wallace Spearmon and Tyson Gay, in a championship record of 37.59 seconds.

His personal best time over 100 metres is 10.01 seconds, achieved in August 2006 in Rieti. His personal best time over 60 metres is 6.53 seconds, achieved in January 2005 in Boston. In the 200 metres, he has 20.97 seconds, achieved in May 2006 in Rio de Janeiro.
