= Yacnier Luis =

Cuban hurdler

Personal information
- Nationality: Cuban
- Born: 24 January 1982 (age 44) Camagüey, Cuba

Sport
- Sport: Track and field
- Event: 400 metres hurdles
Medal record
Representing Cuba
Central American and Caribbean Games
Gold medal – first place	2014 Veracruz	4x100m relay

Yacnier Luis González (born 24 January 1982) is a Cuban hurdler. He competed in the men's 400 metres hurdles at the 2004 Summer Olympics.
