= 2001 World Championships in Athletics – Men's 400 metres hurdles =

Video on YouTube Official Video

These are the official results of the Men's 400 metres Hurdles event at the 2001 IAAF World Championships in Edmonton, Alberta, Canada. There were a total number of 42 participating athletes, with six qualifying heats, three semi-finals and the final held on Friday August 10, 2001 at 21:05h.

== Medalists ==
Gold	Félix Sánchez; Dominican Republic (DOM)
Silver	Fabrizio Mori; Italy (ITA)
Bronze	Dai Tamesue; Japan (JPN)

== Records ==
Standing records prior to the 2001 World Athletics Championships
World Record	Kevin Young (USA)	46.78	August 6, 1992	Barcelona, Spain
Event Record	Kevin Young (USA)	47.18	August 17, 1993	Stuttgart, Germany
Season Best	Angelo Taylor (USA)	47.95	July 4, 2001	Lausanne, Switzerland

== Summary ==
From the gun, Dai Tamesue was out fast, making up the stagger on Fabrizio Mori to his outside in lane 4 by the third hurdle. By the fifth hurdle, Félix Sánchez in lane 5 managed to catch Tamesue, with Hadi Soua'an Al-Somaily not too far behind in lane 1. Tamesue continued the pressure, regaining a slight lead on Sánchez, while Mori maintained the 1 metre gap while running a further distance around the turn. With long strides, Al-Somaily managed to virtually triple jump 13 strides into the eighth hurdle, seizing the lead from Tamesue. Both Tamesue and Al-Somaily began to struggle, their cadence was no longer what it had been. Sánchez maintained his cadence and cruised past, with Mori less than a metre behind. Mori challenged Sánchez to the line but couldn't get ahead. Three metres back, Tamesue was able to regain his advantage over Al-Somaily for bronze.

== Final ==
RANK	FINAL	TIME
	Félix Sánchez (DOM)	47.49
	Fabrizio Mori (ITA)	47.54
	Dai Tamesue (JPN)	47.89
4.	Hadi Soua'an Al-Somaily (KSA)	47.99
5.	Chris Rawlinson (GBR)	48.54
6.	Paweł Januszewski (POL)	48.57
7.	Jiří Mužík (CZE)	49.07
—	Boris Gorban (RUS)	DSQ

== Semi-finals ==
- Held on Wednesday 2001-08-08

RANK	HEAT 1	TIME
1.	Fabrizio Mori (ITA)	48.49
2.	Hadi Soua'an Al-Somaily (KSA)	48.64
3.	Ian Weakley (JAM)	49.04
4.	Angelo Taylor (USA)	49.23
5.	Ruslan Mashchenko (RUS)	49.32
6.	Anthony Borsumato (GBR)	49.48
7.	Yvon Rakotoarimiandry (MAD)	49.81
8.	Eduardo Iván Rodríguez (ESP)	49.92

RANK	HEAT 2	TIME
1.	Chris Rawlinson (GBR)	48.27
2.	Boris Gorban (RUS)	48.50
3.	Jiří Mužík (CZE)	48.53
4.	Calvin Davis (USA)	48.99
5.	Periklis Iakovakis (GRE)	48.38
6.	Neil Gardner (JAM)	49.57
7.	Marek Plawgo (POL)	49.80
8.	Alwyn Myburgh (RSA)	50.34

RANK	HEAT 3	TIME
1.	Félix Sánchez (DOM)	48.07
2.	Dai Tamesue (JPN)	48.10
3.	Paweł Januszewski (POL)	48.40
4.	Mustapha Sdad (MAR)	49.14
5.	James Carter (USA)	49.38
6.	Mario Watts (JAM)	49.96
7.	Blair Young (AUS)	50.21
8.	Eronilde de Araujo (BRA)	51.23

== Heats ==
- Held on Wednesday 2001-08-07

RANK	HEAT 1	TIME
1.	Fabrizio Mori (ITA)	49.29
2.	Ian Weakley (JAM)	49.40
3.	Boris Gorban (RUS)	49.60
4.	Edivaldo Monteiro (POR)	50.42
5.	Hideaki Kawamura (JPN)	50.61
6.	Harijan Ratnayake (SRI)	51.28
–	Du'aine Thorne-Ladejo (GBR)	DNS

RANK	HEAT 2	TIME
1.	Félix Sánchez (DOM)	48.64
2.	Mustapha Sdad (MAR)	48.96
3.	Paweł Januszewski (POL)	49.33
4.	Eduardo Ivan Rodriguez (ESP)	49.51
5.	Calvin Davis (USA)	49.93
6.	Blair Young (AUS)	50.17
7.	Hani Mourhej (SYR)	50.69

RANK	HEAT 3	TIME
1.	Dai Tamesue (JPN)	49.45
2.	Eronilde Nunes de Araujo (BRA)	50.16
3.	James Carter (USA)	50.41
4.	Alain Rohr (SUI)	50.50
5.	Marthinus Kritzinger (RSA)	51.20
6.	Mowen Boino (PNG)	51.82
–	Tien-Wen Chen (TPE)	DQ

RANK	HEAT 4	TIME
1.	Neil Gardner (JAM)	49.29
2.	Angelo Taylor (USA)	49.39
3.	Ruslan Mashchenko (RUS)	49.50
4.	Anthony Borsumato (GBR)	49.65
5.	Ibou Faye (SEN)	50.26
6.	Monte Raymond (CAN)	50.71
–	Gennadiy Gorbenko (UKR)	DNF

RANK	HEAT 5	TIME
1.	Chris Rawlinson (GBR)	49.38
2.	Marek Plawgo (POL)	49.75
3.	Mario Watts (JAM)	49.86
4.	Alwyn Myburgh (RSA)	49.96
5.	Stepan Tesarik (CZE)	50.30
6.	Ken Yoshizawa (JPN)	50.32
7.	Ian Harnden (ZIM)	51.67

RANK	HEAT 6	TIME
1.	Hadi Soua'an Al-Somaily (KSA)	49.42
2.	Jiří Mužík (CZE)	49.65
3.	Periklis Iakovakis (GRE)	49.86
4.	Yvon Rakotoarimiandry (MAD)	50.08
5.	Llewellyn Herbert (RSA)	50.28
6.	Roberto Cortés (ESA)	53.61
–	Viktors Lacis (LAT)	DNF

== See also ==
- 1998 Men's European Championships 400m Hurdles (Budapest)
- 2000 Men's Olympic 400m Hurdles (Sydney)
- 2002 Men's European Championships 400m Hurdles (Munich)
- 2004 Men's Olympic 400m Hurdles (Athens)
