= 2002 European Athletics Championships – Men's 400 metres hurdles =

Men's 400 metres hurdles at the European Athletics Championships

The men's 400 metres hurdles at the 2002 European Athletics Championships were held at the Olympic Stadium on August 7–9.

== Medalists ==
Gold	Silver	Bronze
Stéphane Diagana; France	Jiří Mužík; Czech Republic	Paweł Januszewski; Poland

== Results ==
=== Heats ===
Qualification: First 3 of each heat (Q) and the next 4 fastest (q) qualified for the semifinals.

Rank	Heat	Name	Nationality	Time	Notes
1	1	Paweł Januszewski	Poland	49.17	Q
2	1	Fabrizio Mori	Italy	49.20	Q
3	1	Periklis Iakovakis	Greece	49.24	Q, SB
4	3	Stéphane Diagana	France	49.52	Q
5	1	Mikael Jakobsson	Sweden	49.59	q
6	4	Ruslan Mashchenko	Russia	49.62	Q
7	3	Edivaldo Monteiro	Portugal	49.64	Q, SB
8	4	Chris Rawlinson	Great Britain	49.73	Q
9	2	Jiří Mužík	Czech Republic	49.76	Q
10	1	Pedro Rodrigues	Portugal	49.77	q
11	3	Štěpán Tesařík	Czech Republic	49.78	Q
12	4	Thomas Kortbeek	Netherlands	49.83	Q
13	4	Olivier Jean-Théodore	France	49.91	q
14	2	Anthony Borsumato	Great Britain	49.93	Q
15	3	Matt Elias	Great Britain	50.18	
16	2	Jaime Juan	Spain	50.20	Q
17	2	Naman Keïta	France	50.20	
18	3	Eduardo Iván Rodríguez	Spain	50.26	
19	4	Gianni Carabelli	Italy	50.30	
20	2	Laurent Ottoz	Italy	50.31	
21	2	Janne Mäkelä	Finland	50.32	PB
22	4	Carlos Silva	Portugal	50.45	
23	3	Christian Duma	Germany	50.50	
24	4	Ari-Pekka Lattu	Finland	50.56	
26	1	Jindřich Šimánek	Czech Republic	50.60	
27	2	Henning Hackelbusch	Germany	51.37	
28	3	Jussi Heikkila	Finland	51.47	
29	2	Zakar Nazaryan	Armenia	54.13	
	1	José María Romera	Spain	DQ	

=== Semifinals ===
Qualification: First 4 of each semifinal (Q) qualified directly for the final.

Rank	Heat	Name	Nationality	Time	Notes
1	1	Jiří Mužík	Czech Republic	48.46	Q
2	1	Paweł Januszewski	Poland	48.60	Q
3	1	Fabrizio Mori	Italy	48.70	Q
4	1	Periklis Iakovakis	Greece	48.99	Q
5	2	Stéphane Diagana	France	49.01	Q
6	1	Anthony Borsumato	Great Britain	49.37	
7	2	Chris Rawlinson	Great Britain	49.48	Q
8	2	Ruslan Mashchenko	Russia	49.54	Q
9	2	Štěpán Tesařík	Czech Republic	49.55	Q
10	1	Pedro Rodrigues	Portugal	49.60	
11	2	Edivaldo Monteiro	Portugal	49.75	
12	1	Olivier Jean-Théodore	France	50.21	
13	1	Jaime Juan	Spain	50.57	
14	2	Thomas Kortbeek	Netherlands	50.64	
15	2	José María Romera	Spain	51.11	
16	2	Mikael Jakobsson	Sweden	51.77	

=== Final ===
Rank	Name	Nationality	Time	Notes
1st place, gold medalist(s)	Stéphane Diagana	France	47.58	WL
2nd place, silver medalist(s)	Jiří Mužík	Czech Republic	48.43	SB
3rd place, bronze medalist(s)	Paweł Januszewski	Poland	48.46	SB
4	Fabrizio Mori	Italy	49.05	
5	Periklis Iakovakis	Greece	49.07	
6	Štěpán Tesařík	Czech Republic	49.41	
7	Ruslan Mashchenko	Russia	50.02	
	Chris Rawlinson	Great Britain	DNF	
