= 1992 CARIFTA Games =

XXI CARIFTA Games
- Dates: April 18–20
- Host city: Nassau, Bahamas (The Bahamas)
- Level: Junior and Youth
- Events: 53
- Participation: about 236 athletes from about 19 nations

The 21st CARIFTA Games was held in Nassau, Bahamas, on April 18–20, 1992.

== Participation (unofficial) ==
Detailed result lists can be found on the "World Junior Athletics History" website. An unofficial count yields the number of about 236 athletes (141 junior (under-20) and 95 youth (under-17)) from about 19 countries: Antigua and Barbuda (2), Bahamas (51), Barbados (19), Belize (2), Bermuda (15), British Virgin Islands (4), Cayman Islands (10), Dominica (4), French Guiana (2), Grenada (6), Guadeloupe (20), Guyana (3), Jamaica (58), Martinique (7), Saint Kitts and Nevis (4), Saint Lucia (11), Suriname (1), Trinidad and Tobago (16), Turks and Caicos Islands (1).

== Austin Sealy Award ==
The Austin Sealy Trophy for the most outstanding athlete of the games was awarded to Claudine Williams from Jamaica. She won 2 gold medals (400m, and 800m) in the youth (U-17) category, and a further gold medal in the 4 × 400m relay in the junior (U-20) category.

== Medal summary ==
Medal winners are published by category: Boys under 20 (Junior), Girls under 20 (Junior), Boys under 17 (Youth). and Girls under 17 (Youth). Complete results can be found on the "World Junior Athletics History" website.

=== Boys under 20 (Junior) ===
Event	Gold		Silver		Bronze	
100 metres	Jason Shelton (JAM)	10.47w	Chris Lambert (TRI)	10.56w	Jahzeel Gayle (JAM)	10.57w
200 metres	Carl McPherson (JAM)	21.22w	Jahzeel Gayle (JAM)	21.26w	Theron Cooper (BAH)	21.43w
400 metres	Greg Haughton (JAM)	47.55	Carl McPherson (JAM)	47.76	Theron Cooper (BAH)	48.75
800 metres	Lennox Ellis (BAR)	1:52.29	Bruno Latcha (GLP)	1:52.50	David Nancy (MTQ)	1:52.75
1500 metres	Lennox Ellis (BAR)	4:00.75	Orville Clarke (JAM)	4:01.50	David Nancy (MTQ)	4:02.02
5000 metres	David Bell (BAH)	15:46.68	Alvarez Symonette (BAH)	15:58.36	Preston Campbell (JAM)	16:18.55
110 metres hurdles	Christian Cinélu (MTQ)	15.02	Neil Gardner (JAM)	15.04	Leon Gordon (JAM)	15.18
400 metres hurdles	Ian Weakley (JAM)	53.05	Edward Clarke (JAM)	53.53	Jason Hanna (BAH)	55.34
High jump	Victor Houston (BAR)	2.08	Dennis Fearon (JAM)	2.08	Neil Gardner (JAM)	2.05
Pole vault	Shawn Cousins (JAM)	3.70	Kenny Moxey (BAH)	2.74		
Long jump	Keita Cline (IVB)	7.61w	Leon Gordon (JAM)	7.44w	Carlos Mingoes (JAM)	7.27w
Triple jump	Keita Cline (IVB)	16.20w	Victor Houston (BAR)	15.12w	Carlos Mingoes (JAM)	14.67
Shot put	Olu Tinubu (BAH)	14.50	Howard Brown (JAM)	13.90	Dave Taylor (BAR)	13.32
Discus throw	Olu Tinubu (BAH)	47.78	Nigel Green (JAM)	43.95	Howard Brown (JAM)	43.50
Javelin throw	Jermaine Curry (BAH)	63.11	Gavin Gill (LCA)	58.55	Michael Vincent (GRN)	57.66
4 × 100 metres relay	Jamaica; Leon Gordon; Jason Shelton; Mark Blake; Jahzeel Gayle	41.23	Barbados; Victor Houston; Thaniya Lopez; Ryan Roach; Obadele Thompson	41.84	Bahamas; Carlos Albury; Judson Jervis; Theron Cooper; Alfred Stubbs	41.85
4 × 400 metres relay	Barbados	3:16.92	Bahamas	3:20.28	Bermuda; Marco Perinchief; Tony Bean; Anthony Wedderburn; Devon Bean	3:22.17

=== Girls under 20 (Junior) ===
Event	Gold		Silver		Bronze	
100 metres (4.7 m/s)	Christine Arron (GLP)	11.31w	Savatheda Fynes (BAH)	11.52w	Dedra Davis (BAH)	11.61w
200 metres (3.1 m/s)	Savatheda Fynes (BAH)	23.49w	Carmetta McKay (BAH)	23.91w	Maxine Dawkins (JAM)	24.22w
400 metres	Ellen Grant (JAM)	54.83	Wynsome Cole (JAM)	55.31	Carmetta McKay (BAH)	55.73
800 metres	Dawn Williams (DMA)	2:11.89	Vernetta Rolle (BAH)	2:12.50	Michelle Clarke (JAM)	2:13.95
1500 metres	Janice Turner (JAM)	4:36.80	Michelle Clarke (JAM)	4:38.76	Charmaine Thomas (ATG)	4:49.44
3000 metres	Evette Turner (JAM)	9:58.48	Joylett Simpson (JAM)	10:30.24	Geraldine McQueen (GRN)	10:43.21
100 metres hurdles	Delloreen Ennis (JAM)	13.92	Nadège Joseph (GUF)	14.08	Brigitte Foster (JAM)	14.19
400 metres hurdles	Wynsome Cole (JAM)	60.56	Arniece McPhee (BAH)	63.30	Sharmaine McKenzie (BAH)	64.78
High jump	Najuma Fletcher (GUY)	1.75	Lacena Golding (JAM)	1.66	Urania Joseph (LCA)	1.63
Long jump	Dedra Davis (BAH)	6.30	Lacena Golding (JAM)	6.15w	Suzette Lee (JAM)	5.97w
Shot put	Dominique Perroni (MTQ)	12.81	Maxine McKenzie (JAM)	12.61	Anne-Marie Marival (GLP)	12.56
Discus throw	Olivia McKoy (JAM)	37.86	Maxine McKenzie (JAM)	37.12	Murielle Flamand (MTQ)	37.04
Javelin throw	Patricia Scotland (BER)	43.70	Marsha Mark (TRI)	42.39	Olivia McKoy (JAM)	36.37
4 × 100 metres relay	Jamaica; Beverley Langley; Bridgette Edwards; Kerry-Ann Richards; Maxine Dawkins	45.54	Bahamas; Debbie Ferguson; Carmetta Mackey; Dedra Davis; Savatheda Fynes	45.61	Guadeloupe; Sandra Citté; Viviane Sildillia; Stéphanie Sylvestre; Christine Arron	45.79
4 × 400 metres relay	Jamaica; Ellen Grant; Tanya Jarrett; Suzette Lee; Claudine Williams	3:40.74	Bahamas; Debbie Ferguson; Vernetta Rolle; Tonique Williams; Savatheda Fynes	3:42.37	Saint Lucia; Nadine Pascal; Michelle Baptiste; Urania Joseph; Vernetta Lesforis	4:05.94

=== Boys under 17 (Youth) ===
Event	Gold		Silver		Bronze	
100 metres	Obadele Thompson (BAR)	10.59w	Mark Blake (JAM)	10.77w	Jimmy Elmin (MTQ)	10.80w
200 metres	Davian Clarke (JAM)	21.52	Obadele Thompson (BAR)	21.61	Ryan Roach (BAR)	22.40
400 metres	Davian Clarke (JAM)	47.75	Mark Blake (JAM)	48.99	Garth Chadband (TRI)	49.72
800 metres	Howard Reid (JAM)	2:00.19	Shariff Taylor (BER)	2:00.22	Angelito Davis (JAM)	2:01.18
1500 metres	Howard Reid (JAM)	4:13.05	Shawn Martin (JAM)	4:13.62	Fitzroy Davis (DMA)	4:26.15
High jump	Stephen Woodley (BER)	1.97	Rohan Simons (BER)	1.94	Ricardo Jacques (BAH)	1.94
Long jump	Lancelot Gooden (JAM)	7.00w	Stephen Woodley (BER)	6.92w	Alvaro McDonald (BAH)	6.90w
Triple jump	Stephen Woodley (BER)	14.29	Samuel Lefleur (BAH)	13.88	Emmanuel Bergoz (MTQ)	13.62
Shot put	Hose Hilton (BAH)	15.26	Olivier Andirin (GLP)	13.85	Hubert Knight (JAM)	13.36
Discus throw	Anthony Alexander (TRI)	46.46	Hose Hilton (BAH)	42.68	Dominic Powell (CAY)	41.48
Javelin throw	Selwyn Smith (GRN)	57.39	Julian Mangal (BAR)	56.85	Dominic Powell (CAY)	53.53

=== Girls under 17 (Youth) ===
Event	Gold		Silver		Bronze	
100 metres	Debbie Ferguson (BAH)	11.79	Beverley Langley (JAM)	11.81	Patricia Buval (MTQ)	11.83
200 metres	Beverley Langley (JAM)	23.60w	Debbie Ferguson (BAH)	23.97w	Kerry-Ann Richards (JAM)	24.15w
400 metres	Claudine Williams (JAM)	53.50	Debbie Ferguson (BAH)	54.68	Tanya Jarrett (JAM)	54.87
800 metres	Claudine Williams (JAM)	2:12.31	Tanya Jarrett (JAM)	2:21.82	Claudine Pascal (LCA)	2:26.62
1500 metres	Evette Turner (JAM)	4:40.26	Joylett Simpson (JAM)	4:44.44	Geraldine McQueen (GRN)	4:51.65
High jump	Lisa Wright (JAM)	1.71	Jill Eneas (BAH)	1.71	Tanya Wildgoose (BAH)	1.71
Long jump	Lisa Wright (JAM)	5.88w	Ronalee Davis (JAM)	5.79w	Michelle Baptiste (LCA)	5.50w
Shot put	Paula Mascoll (BAR)	11.01	Paulette Rolle (BAH)	10.50	Megan Colebrook (BAH)	9.99
Discus throw	Marsha Turner (JAM)	32.94	Megan Colebrook (BAH)	31.81	Natalie Paul (TRI)	31.80
Javelin throw	Cleopatra Francis (TRI)	34.20	Shenique Musgrove (BAH)	30.96	Susan Borden (CAY)	28.40

== Medal table (unofficial) ==
* Host nation (Bahamas)

Rank	Nation	Gold	Silver	Bronze	Total
1	Jamaica (JAM)	26	23	16	65
2	Bahamas (BAH)*	8	17	11	36
3	Barbados (BAR)	6	4	2	12
4	Bermuda (BER)	3	3	1	7
5	Trinidad and Tobago (TTO)	2	2	2	6
6	Martinique (MTQ)	2	0	6	8
7	British Virgin Islands (IVB)	2	0	0	2
8	Guadeloupe (GLP)	1	2	2	5
9	Grenada (GRN)	1	0	3	4
10	Dominica (DMA)	1	0	1	2
11	Guyana (GUY)	1	0	0	1
12	Saint Lucia (LCA)	0	1	4	5
13	French Guiana (GUF)	0	1	0	1
14	Cayman Islands (CAY)	0	0	3	3
15	Antigua and Barbuda (ATG)	0	0	1	1
Totals (15 entries)		53	53	52	158
