= 1993 CARIFTA Games =

XXII CARIFTA Games
- Dates: April 10–11
- Host city: Fort-de-France, Martinique
- Level: Junior and Youth
- Events: 55
- Participation: about 272 athletes from about 19 nations

The 22nd CARIFTA Games was held in Fort-de-France, Martinique, on April 10–11, 1993.

== Participation (unofficial) ==
Detailed result lists can be found on the "World Junior Athletics History" website. An unofficial count yields the number of about 272 athletes (175 junior (under-20) and 97 youth (under-17)) from about 19 countries: Antigua and Barbuda (3), Bahamas (28), Barbados (32), Belize (1), Bermuda (13), British Virgin Islands (7), Cayman Islands (2), Dominica (1), French Guiana (4), Grenada (8), Guadeloupe (26), Guyana (5), Jamaica (54), Martinique (36), Saint Kitts and Nevis (7), Saint Lucia (12), Saint Vincent and the Grenadines (1), Trinidad and Tobago (29), US Virgin Islands (3).

== Austin Sealy Award ==
The Austin Sealy Trophy for the most outstanding athlete of the games was awarded to Nikole Mitchell from Jamaica. She won 3 gold medals (100m, 200m, and 4 × 100m relay) in the junior (U-20) category.

== Medal summary ==
Medal winners are published by category: Boys under 20 (Junior), Girls under 20 (Junior), Boys under 17 (Youth), and Girls under 17 (Youth). Complete results can be found on the "World Junior Athletics History" website.

=== Boys under 20 (Junior) ===
Event	Gold		Silver		Bronze	
100 metres (-0.9 m/s)	Obadele Thompson (BAR)	10.71	Jason Shelton (JAM)	10.80	Gilles Ricard (GLP)	10.83
200 metres (-0.3 m/s)	Davian Clarke (JAM)	21.25	Obadele Thompson (BAR)	21.42	Theron Cooper (BAH)	21.54
400 metres	Davian Clarke (JAM)	46.56	Edward Clarke (JAM)	46.90	Theron Cooper (BAH)	47.35
800 metres	Michael McDonald (JAM)	1:51.43	Oniel Duncan (JAM)	1:51.86	Benton Brudy (SKN)	1:53.11
1500 metres	Horace Steele (JAM)	3:58.91	David Bell (BAH)	3:59.92	Escoffrey Thomas (JAM)	4:01.31
5000 metres	Sheik Mohammed (GUY)	15:28.99	Zepharinus Joseph (LCA)	15:31.61	William Mahler (BIZ)	15:43.80
110 metres hurdles (1.2 m/s)	Neil Gardner (JAM)	14.40	Gabriel Burnett (BAR)	14.80	Maurice Wignall (JAM)	14.83
400 metres hurdles	Ian Weakley (JAM)	51.75	Olivier Jean-Théodore (MTQ)	53.47	Gabriel Burnett (BAR)	54.46
High jump	Victor Houston (BAR)	2.10	Neil Gardner (JAM)	2.05	Stephen Woodley (BER)	2.02
Pole vault	Kenny Moxey (BAH)	4.11	David Green (JAM)	3.60	Ian Butler (BAH)	3.40
Long jump	Keita Cline (IVB)	7.31	Maurice Wignall (JAM)	7.13	Victor Houston (BAR)	7.10
Triple jump	Victor Houston (BAR)	15.68	Neil Gardner (JAM)	15.62	Keita Cline (IVB)	15.47w
Shot put	Christopher Wilson (JAM)	13.89	Olivier Andirin (GLP)	13.67	Dave Taylor (BAR)	13.09
Discus throw	Marvin Whiley (BAH)	45.80	Dave Taylor (BAR)	41.60	Mark Ellis (JAM)	41.58
Javelin throw	Selwyn Smith (GRN)	61.62	Jermaine Curry (BAH)	61.32	Camille Bechet (GUF)	57.64
4 × 100 metres relay	Guadeloupe; Youri Arron; P. Bilongue; X. Couchi; Gilles Ricard	41.46	Jamaica; Damion Atkinson; Shane Brown; Kirk Jones; Craig McIntosh	41.68	Barbados; G. Ward; Victor Houston; Obadele Thompson; Jason St. Hill	42.47
4 × 400 metres relay	Jamaica; Davian Clarke; Edward Clarke; O'Neil Duncan; Michael McDonald	3:10.26	Trinidad and Tobago; Nigel Baptiste; Colin Burnett; Garth Chadband; Aaron Jack	3:15.17	Barbados; Brian Brewster; Victor Houston; Shurlon Mayers; Fabian Rollins	3:19.72

=== Girls under 20 (Junior) ===
Event	Gold		Silver		Bronze	
100 metres (0.3 m/s)	Nikole Mitchell (JAM)	11.43	Savatheda Fynes (BAH)	11.71	Debbie Ferguson (BAH)	11.79
200 metres (-1.2 m/s)	Nikole Mitchell (JAM)	23.25	Astia Walker (JAM)	23.65	Savatheda Fynes (BAH)	23.81
400 metres	Claudine Williams (JAM)	52.90	Tracey Barnes (JAM)	54.17	Vernetta Rolle (BAH)	54.19
800 metres	Claudine Williams (JAM)	2:11.52	Charmaine Howell (JAM)	2:11.94	Vernetta Rolle (BAH)	2:12.52
1500 metres	Michelle Clarke (JAM)	4:31.87	Charmaine Howell (JAM)	4:41.86	Geraldine McQueen (GRN)	4:48.90
3000 metres	Michelle Clarke (JAM)	10:02.22	Dahlia Henry (JAM)	10:36.71	Geraldine McQueen (GRN)	10:44.96
100 metres hurdles (1.1 m/s)	Brigitte Foster (JAM)	14.22	Denise Coudoux (GLP)	14.53	Noretta William (MTQ)	14.62
400 metres hurdles	Wynsome Cole (JAM)	59.16	Sharmaine McKenzie (BAH)	62.37	Neketa Sears (BAH)	63.88
High jump	Lisa Wright (JAM)	1.71	Paulette Reid (BAR)	1.68	Lacena Golding (JAM)	1.64
Long jump	Lacena Golding (JAM)	6.07	Lisa Wright (JAM)	5.79	Rhonda Forbes (TRI)	5.76
Triple jump	Lisa Wright (JAM)	12.52	Lacena Golding (JAM)	12.27	Abigail Ferguson (BAH)	11.72
Shot put	Anne-Marie Marival (GLP)	12.99	Maxine McKenzie (JAM)	12.92	Gladys Sainte-Rose (MTQ)	11.95
Discus throw	Marcia Taylor (BAH)	38.66	Marsha Minns (BAH)	38.34	Trudi Holder (BAR)	36.38
Javelin throw	Marsha Mark (TRI)	43.40	Shenelle Joseph (LCA)	39.40	Shenique Musgrove (BAH)	38.42
4 × 100 metres relay	Jamaica; Peta-Gaye Dowdie; Beverley Langley; Nikole Mitchell; Tulia Robinson	45.23	Bahamas; Debbie Ferguson; Savatheda Fynes; Tonique Williams; Vernetta Rolle	45.53	Guadeloupe; N. Absalon; Isabelle Beaumont; Pierre-Marie Marival; N'Daye Nepotel	46.39
4 × 400 metres relay	Jamaica; Tracey Barnes; Winsome Cole; Charmaine Howell; Tanya Jarrett	3:35.76	Bahamas; Debbie Ferguson; Tonique Williams; Savatheda Fynes; Vernetta Rolle	3:39.32	Barbados; Andrea Blackett; Jackie Blackett; Cherita Howard; Melissa Straker	3:52.48

=== Boys under 17 (Youth) ===
Event	Gold		Silver		Bronze	
100 metres (-0.5 m/s)	Damion Atkinson (JAM)	11.21	Kirk Jones (JAM)	11.26	Donte Hunt (BER)	11.30
200 metres (-0.4 m/s)	Ruddy Zami (GLP)	21.99	Damion Atkinson (JAM)	22.22	Shane Brown (JAM)	22.36
400 metres	Shane Brown (JAM)	49.23	Shurlon Mayers (BAR)	49.46	Ryan Highland (BAR)	49.97
800 metres	Rohan McDonald (JAM)	1:57.92	George Daley (JAM)	1:57.93	Michael Donawa (BER)	1:58.84
1500 metres	Rohan McDonald (JAM)	4:12.76	Didier Farouil (GLP)	4:17.28	George Daley (JAM)	4:19.02
400 metres hurdles	Kirk Jones (JAM)	56.58	Rudo Alexander (TRI)	56.80	Dwight Williams (JAM)	57.12
High jump	Enrico Gordon (JAM)	2.04	Ryan Chambers (JAM)	2.00	Rohan Simons (BER)	1.97
Long jump	Samuel Lefleur (BAH)	6.73	Garfield Swaby (JAM)	6.55	Allen Mortimer (BAH)	6.42
Triple jump	Allen Mortimer (BAH)	14.58	Rohan Simons (BER)	14.44	Samuel Lefleur (BAH)	14.29
Shot put	Dereck Flowers (BAH)	13.75	Andrew Davies (BAR)	13.31	Jean Neller (MTQ)	13.31
Discus throw	O'Neil Broomfield (JAM)	39.24	Omar Rogers (JAM)	38.28	Andrew Davies (BAR)	36.18
Javelin throw	Kerry Edwards (TRI)	59.38	Kyron Peters (GRN)	54.18	Moise Louisy-Louis (MTQ)	52.08

=== Girls under 17 (Youth) ===
Event	Gold		Silver		Bronze	
100 metres (-0.6 m/s)	Alicia Tyson (TRI)	11.95	Tulia Robinson (JAM)	12.03	Isabelle Beaumont (GLP)	12.10
200 metres (0.8 m/s)	Alicia Tyson (TRI)	24.17	Peta-Gaye Dowdie (JAM)	24.28	Tulia Robinson (JAM)	24.64
400 metres	Tanya Jarrett (JAM)	54.15	Onica Fraser (GUY)	56.00	Sherline Williams (BAR)	57.31
800 metres	Tanya Jarrett (JAM)	2:13.14	Evette Turner (JAM)	2:14.33	Sherline Williams (BAR)	2:15.80
1500 metres	Evette Turner (JAM)	4:37.78	Joylett Simpson (JAM)	4:45.64	Vernae Ingram (BER)	4:54.98
High jump	Karen Rodney (JAM)	1.75	Tanya Wildgoose (BAH)	1.73	Roatter Johnson (SKN)	1.54
Long jump	Karen Rodney (JAM)	5.71	Donna Mullings (JAM)	5.55	Shonell Symonette (BAH)	5.23
Shot put	Astrid Firpion (GLP)	12.10	Paula Mascoll (BAR)	11.84	Corean Wills (TRI)	10.88
Discus throw	Beverley Sullivan (BAR)	35.92	Sheryl Andersen (JAM)	32.74	Rhonda Hackett (TRI)	32.28
Javelin throw	Prudence Lewis (GRN)	38.54	Corean Wills (TRI)	34.06	Samantha Black (BAH)	31.46

== Medal table (unofficial) ==
* Host nation (Martinique)

Rank	Nation	Gold	Silver	Bronze	Total
1	Jamaica (JAM)	33	28	8	69
2	Bahamas (BAH)	6	8	14	28
3	Barbados (BAR)	4	7	11	22
4	Guadeloupe (GLP)	4	3	3	10
4	Trinidad and Tobago (TTO)	4	3	3	10
6	Grenada (GRN)	2	1	2	5
7	Guyana (GUY)	1	1	0	2
8	British Virgin Islands (IVB)	1	0	1	2
9	Saint Lucia (LCA)	0	2	0	2
10	Bermuda (BER)	0	1	5	6
11	Martinique (MTQ)*	0	1	4	5
12	Saint Kitts and Nevis (SKN)	0	0	2	2
13	Belize (BIZ)	0	0	1	1
13	French Guiana (GUF)	0	0	1	1
Totals (14 entries)		55	55	55	165
