= Athletics at the 2002 Commonwealth Games – Men's 400 metres hurdles =

Men's 400 metres hurdles at the Commonwealth Games

The men's 400 metres hurdles event at the 2002 Commonwealth Games was held on 28–29 July.

== Medalists ==
| Gold | Silver | Bronze |
|---|---|---|
| Chris Rawlinson; England | Matthew Elias; Wales | Ian Weakley; Jamaica |

== Results ==
=== Heats ===
Qualification: First 3 of each heat (Q) and the next 2 fastest (q) qualified for the final.

| Rank | Heat | Name | Nationality | Time | Notes |
|---|---|---|---|---|---|
| 1 | 1 | Matthew Elias | Wales | 49.11 | Q, NR |
| 2 | 1 | Anthony Borsumato | England | 49.26 | Q |
| 3 | 1 | Ian Weakley | Jamaica | 49.38 | Q |
| 4 | 1 | Matthew Douglas | England | 49.38 | q, SB |
| 5 | 2 | Chris Rawlinson | England | 49.66 | Q |
| 6 | 2 | Willie Smith | Namibia | 49.83 | Q |
| 7 | 2 | Dinsdale Morgan | Jamaica | 49.87 | Q |
| 8 | 2 | Ashoka Jayasundra | Sri Lanka | 51.02 | q |
| 9 | 1 | Allah Ditta | Pakistan | 51.03 | SB |
| 10 | 2 | Mowen Boino | Papua New Guinea | 51.05 | NR |
| 11 | 2 | Ryan King | Barbados | 51.35 | |
| 12 | 1 | Richard McDonald | Scotland | 51.46 | |
| 13 | 2 | James Hillier | Wales | 51.54 | |
| | 1 | Kemel Thompson | Jamaica | DNS | |
| | 2 | Nicolas Stewart | Canada | DNS | |

=== Final ===
| Rank | Name | Nationality | Time | Notes |
|---|---|---|---|---|
| 1st place, gold medalist(s) | Chris Rawlinson | England | 49.14 | |
| 2nd place, silver medalist(s) | Matthew Elias | Wales | 49.28 | |
| 3rd place, bronze medalist(s) | Ian Weakley | Jamaica | 49.69 | |
| 4 | Anthony Borsumato | England | 49.72 | |
| 5 | Dinsdale Morgan | Jamaica | 50.14 | |
| 6 | Willie Smith | Namibia | 50.14 | |
| 7 | Ashoka Jayasundra | Sri Lanka | 50.63 | |
| 8 | Matthew Douglas | England | 51.01 | |
