= 1994 CARIFTA Games =

XXIII CARIFTA Games
- Dates: April 2–4
- Host city: Bridgetown, Barbados
- Level: Junior and Youth
- Events: 58
- Participation: about 265 athletes from about 17 nations

The 23rd CARIFTA Games was held in Bridgetown, Barbados, on April 2–4, 1994.

== Participation (unofficial) ==
Detailed result lists can be found on the "World Junior Athletics History" website. An unofficial count yields the number of about 265 athletes (153 junior (under-20) and 112 youth (under-17)) from about 17 countries: Antigua and Barbuda (2), Bahamas (30), Barbados (44), Bermuda (12), British Virgin Islands (3), Cayman Islands (3), Dominica (2), French Guiana (6), Grenada (10), Guadeloupe (21), Guyana (9), Jamaica (60), Martinique (15), Saint Kitts and Nevis (9), Saint Lucia (3), Saint Vincent and the Grenadines (1), Trinidad and Tobago (35).

== Austin Sealy Award ==
The Austin Sealy Trophy for the most outstanding athlete of the games was awarded to Obadele Thompson from Barbados. He won 2 gold medals (100m, and 200m) in the junior (U-20) category setting new games records.

== Medal summary ==
Medal winners are published by category: Boys under 20 (Junior), Girls under 20 (Junior), Boys under 17 (Youth), and Girls under 17 (Youth). Complete results can be found on the "World Junior Athletics History" website.

=== Boys under 20 (Junior) ===
Event	Gold		Silver		Bronze	
100 metres	Obadele Thompson (BAR)	10.33	Brian Babbs (BAH)	10.75	Wayne Johnson (JAM)	10.76
200 metres	Obadele Thompson (BAR)	20.71	Ruddy Zami (GLP)	21.42	Judson Jervis (BAH)	21.57
400 metres	Michael McDonald (JAM)	47.02	Lorenzo Robinson (JAM)	47.06	Dennis Darling (BAH)	47.72
800 metres	Joël Morentin (GLP)	1:54.00	Howard Reid (JAM)	1:54.42	Garfield Samuels (JAM)	1:55.38
1500 metres	Delmore Delevante (JAM)	3:55.56	David Bell (BAH)	3:58.16	Richard Jones (TRI)	3:58.63
5000 metres	Delmore Delevante (JAM)	15:28.45	Richard Jones (TRI)	15:34.40	Zepharinus Joseph (LCA)	15:36.93
110 metres hurdles	Gabriel Burnett (BAR)	14.68	Maurice Wignall (JAM)	15.01	Terry Liverpool (TRI)	15.89
400 metres hurdles	Kevin James (JAM)	52.23	Gabriel Burnett (BAR)	52.69	Edward Clarke (JAM)	53.32
High jump	Stephen Woodley (BER)	2.13	Enrico Gordon (JAM)	2.09	Robert Bynoe (GUY)	2.02
Pole vault	Kenny Moxey (BAH)	3.96	André Williams (JAM)	3.60	Dion Kong (TRI)	2.70
Long jump	Maurice Wignall (JAM)	7.49	Kerl Chai Hong (TRI)	7.27	Aaron Bean (BER)	7.02
Triple jump	Allen Mortimer (BAH)	15.65	Vance Clarke (SKN)	15.21	Stephen Woodley (BER)	14.97
Shot put	Olivier Andirin (GLP)	14.51	O'Neil Smythe (JAM)	12.77	Anthony Alexander (TRI)	12.53
Discus throw	Anthony Alexander (TRI)	43.06	O'Neil Smythe (JAM)	42.16	Ahville Black (JAM)	40.10
Javelin throw	Selwyn Smith (GRN)	59.40	Hubert Knight (JAM)	53.18	Julian Mangal (BAR)	51.98
4 × 100 metres relay	Jamaica; Lorenzo Robinson; Wayne Johnson; Maurice Wignall; Christopher Butler	41.13	Guadeloupe; Stephane Peccatus; Ruddy Zami; Didier Héry; Gilles Ricard	41.40	Bahamas; Dennis Darling; Brian Babbs; Osbourne Moxey; Judson Jervis	41.54
4 × 400 metres relay	Jamaica; Edward Clarke; Lorenzo Robinson; LaTonel Williams; Michael McDonald	3:09.47	Barbados; Gabriel Burnett; Fabian Rollins; Gregory Hughes; Jason St. Hill	3:14.37	Trinidad and Tobago; Declan Wattley; Marlon de Leon; Ivor Hamilton; Garth Chadband	3:16.56

=== Girls under 20 (Junior) ===
Event	Gold		Silver		Bronze	
100 metres	Debbie Ferguson (BAH)	11.58	Kerry-Ann Richards (JAM)	11.72	Beverley Langley (JAM)	11.89
200 metres	Debbie Ferguson (BAH)	23.53	Beverley Langley (JAM)	23.90	Tracey Barnes (JAM)	23.98
400 metres	Vernetta Rolle (BAH)	53.55	Tonique Williams (BAH)	53.72	Tracey Barnes (JAM)	53.77
800 metres	Tanya Jarrett (JAM)	2:09.76	Vernetta Rolle (BAH)	2:10.30	Charmaine Howell (JAM)	2:11.91
1500 metres	Charmaine Howell (JAM)	4:44.46	Evette Turner (JAM)	4:46.95	Sandra Scott (GRN)	4:51.74
3000 metres	Evette Turner (JAM)	10:35.15	Sandra Scott (GRN)	10:35.59	Keisha Gray (TRI)	10:37.42
100 metres hurdles	Delloreen Ennis (JAM)	14.53	Valérie Castor (GUF)	14.86	Peta-Gaye Dowdie (JAM)	15.08
400 metres hurdles	Tanya Jarrett (JAM)	59.77	Andrea Blackett (BAR)	61.29	Victoria Pacifique (TRI)	64.36
High jump	Natalie Richardson (JAM)	1.74	Lisa Wright (JAM)	1.74	Paulette Reid (BAR)	1.74
Long jump	Trecia Smith (JAM)	6.06	Ronalee Davis (JAM)	5.98	Cherita Howard (BAR)	5.68
Triple jump	Ronalee Davis (JAM)	13.12w	Lisa Wright (JAM)	12.17	Eugénie Elisabeth (GUF)	11.98
Shot put	Anne-Marie Marival (GLP)	13.25	Astrid Firpion (GLP)	12.39	Rhonda Hackett (TRI)	12.14
Discus throw	Trudi Holder (BAR)	41.70	Grettel Miller (JAM)	40.52	Fostine Thomas (JAM)	40.40
Javelin throw	Shenique Musgrove (BAH)	44.34	Trishel Thompson (GUY)	38.84	Grettel Miller (JAM)	38.76
4 × 100 metres relay	Jamaica; Tulia Robinson; Kerry-Ann Richards; Maria Brown; Beverley Langley	44.91	Bahamas; Tonique Williams; Tamara Cherebin; Dewanna Wright; Debbie Ferguson	45.66	Guadeloupe; Pierre-Marie Marival; Nadine Mahobah; Myriam Urcel; Isabelle Beaumont	46.57
4 × 400 metres relay	Jamaica; Tanya Jarrett; Shelly-Ann Berth; Tanieca Williams; T. Barnett	3:35.91	Bahamas; Debbie Ferguson; Tonique Williams; Ingrid Sears; Vernetta Rolle	3:36.53	Barbados; Kay Sealy; Cherita Howard; Andrea Blackett; Melissa Straker	3:42.54

=== Boys under 17 (Youth) ===
Event	Gold		Silver		Bronze	
100 metres (0.1 m/s)	Jason Gerald (TRI)	11.12	Didier Henry (GLP)	11.23	Shane Brown (JAM)	11.27
200 metres	Latonel Williams (JAM)	22.0	Oral Telphia (JAM)	22.4	Jason Gerald (TRI)	22.5
400 metres	Latonel Williams (JAM)	49.23	Shane Brown (JAM)	49.27	Marlon de Leon (TRI)	49.74
800 metres	Jermaine Barclay (JAM)	1:59.6	Norval Glave (JAM)	2:00.3	Jason Parris (TRI)	2:03.3
1500 metres	Michael Donawa (BER)	4:06.51	Jermaine Barclay (JAM)	4:10.02	Narvin Beharry (TRI)	4:10.45
100 metres hurdles	Kurt Duncan (JAM)	13.98	Désiré Delric (MTQ)	14.24	Oral Telphia (JAM)	14.57
400 metres hurdles	Kurt Duncan (JAM)	55.38	Seth Billy (BAR)	57.12	Shane Brown (JAM)	57.93
High jump	Ryan Chambers (JAM)	2.10	Kerry Edwards (TRI)	2.08	Yohance Young (BAR)	1.96
Long jump	Sébastien Pincemail (GLP)	6.72	David Gosset (GLP)	6.64	Osbourne Moxey (BAH)	6.56
Triple jump	Thierry Babel (GLP)	13.78	Gregory Hughes (BAR)	13.62	Mervin Swaby (JAM)	13.51
Shot put	Dave Stoute (TRI)	14.40	Rory Marsh (JAM)	13.36	Denzil Rolle (BAH)	13.05
Discus throw	Rory Marsh (JAM)	40.88	Denzil Rolle (BAH)	39.72	Dave Stoute (TRI)	39.48
Javelin throw	Kerry Edwards (TRI)	55.36	Moise Louisy-Louis (MTQ)	51.64	Esmond Hutchinson (GRN)	48.54

=== Girls under 17 (Youth) ===
Event	Gold		Silver		Bronze	
100 metres	Ayanna Hutchinson (TRI)	11.88	Maria Brown (JAM)	11.97	Cydonie Mothersill (CAY)	11.97
200 metres	Ayanna Hutchinson (TRI)	24.30	Cydonie Mothersill (CAY)	24.31	Tulia Robinson (JAM)	24.57
400 metres	Ingrid Sears (BAH)	55.45	Sindy John (TRI)	55.59	Tanieca Williams (JAM)	55.89
800 metres	Janelle Inniss (BAR)	2:15.1	Florence Hunt (GLP)	2:16.0	Vernae Ingram (BER)	2:16.2
1500 metres	Janelle Inniss (BAR)	4:44.47	Dahlia Henry (JAM)	4:49.59	Keisha Gray (TRI)	4:56.37
100 metres hurdles	Cynthia Octavia (MTQ)	14.8	Benedicte Resin (MTQ)	15.3	Natalie Chandler (BAR)	15.5
300 metres hurdles	Kaysia McKoy (JAM)	44.16	Tomeca Brown (JAM)	46.05	Anna-Lee Walcott (TRI)	46.12
High jump	Keisha Spencer (JAM)	1.70	Ayesha Maycock (BAR)	1.65	Leslia Miller (BAH)	1.62
Long jump	Dolette Blake (JAM)	5.86	Andrea Bradshaw (BAR)	5.65	Kaysia McKoy (JAM)	5.60
Shot put	Joëlle Julianne (MTQ)	11.01	Christelle Bornil (MTQ)	10.80	Malorie McIntosh (BAH)	10.34
Discus throw	Nadine Clarke (JAM)	33.88	Béatrice Louisy-Louis (MTQ)	31.98	Roxanne Rankin (CAY)	31.46
Javelin throw	Anna-Lee Walcott (TRI)	36.12	Doris Thompson (BAH)	35.92	Keisha Pratt (BAH)	32.60

== Medal table (unofficial) ==
* Host nation (Barbados)

Rank	Nation	Gold	Silver	Bronze	Total
1	Jamaica (JAM)	28	23	18	69
2	Bahamas (BAH)	7	8	8	23
3	Trinidad and Tobago (TTO)	7	4	15	26
4	Barbados (BAR)*	6	7	6	19
5	Guadeloupe (GLP)	5	6	1	12
6	Martinique (MTQ)	2	5	0	7
7	Bermuda (BER)	2	0	3	5
8	Grenada (GRN)	1	1	2	4
9	Cayman Islands (CAY)	0	1	2	3
10	French Guiana (GUF)	0	1	1	2
10	Guyana (GUY)	0	1	1	2
12	Saint Kitts and Nevis (SKN)	0	1	0	1
13	Saint Lucia (LCA)	0	0	1	1
Totals (13 entries)		58	58	58	174
