= Geraldine McQueen =

Geraldine McQueen may refer to:

- Geraldine McQueen (character), a fictional singer-songwriter from Britain's Got the Pop Factor...
- Geraldine McQueen (athlete), Grenadian middle-distance runner
