= Masters M50 400 metres hurdles world record progression =

This is the progression of world record improvements of the 400 metres hurdles M50 division of Masters athletics.

Key

Incomplete information Pending

| Hand | Auto | Athlete | Nationality | Birthdate | Age | Location | Date | Ref |
|---|---|---|---|---|---|---|---|---|
| | 54.91 | Ian Weakley | United States | 24 February 1974 | 50 years, 175 days | Gothenburg | 17 August 2024 | |
| | 54.75 | Ian Weakley | United States | 24 February 1974 | 50 years, 143 days | Berea | 16 July 2024 | |
| | 55.99 | Toine van Beckhoven | Netherlands | 1 January 1970 | 53 years, 140 days | Eindhoven | 21 May 2023 | |
| | 56.35 | Mattias Sunneborn | Sweden | 27 September 1970 | 50 years, 259 days | Sollentuna | 13 June 2021 | |
| | 56.56 | Howard Moscrop | Great Britain | 16 December 1957 | 50 years, 202 days | Birmingham | 5 July 2008 | |
| 58.1 h | | Jack Greenwood | United States | 5 February 1926 | 50 years, 149 days | Gresham | 3 July 1976 | |
