= 2002 African Championships in Athletics – Men's 400 metres hurdles =

The men's 400 metres hurdles event at the 2002 African Championships in Athletics was held in Radès, Tunisia on August 8–9.

== Medalists ==
Gold	Silver	Bronze
Llewellyn Herbert; South Africa	Willie Smith; Namibia	Héni Kechi; Tunisia

== Results ==
=== Heats ===
Rank	Heat	Name	Nationality	Time	Notes
1	1	Llewellyn Herbert	South Africa	50.99	Q
2	1	Héni Kechi	Tunisia	51.21	Q
3	2	Willie Smith	Namibia	52.14	Q
4	2	Nabil Selmi	Algeria	52.39	Q
5	2	Yvon Rakotoarimiandry	Madagascar	52.58	Q
6	1	Tahar Ghozali	Algeria	53.06	Q
7	2	Selim Medersi	Tunisia	53.09	q
8	1	Arlindo Pinheiro	São Tomé and Príncipe	53.43	q
9	2	Ibrahima Maïga	Mali	53.65	
10	2	Lensley Juhel	Mauritius	53.97	

=== Final ===
Rank	Name	Nationality	Time	Notes
1st place, gold medalist(s)	Llewellyn Herbert	South Africa	49.76	
2nd place, silver medalist(s)	Willie Smith	Namibia	50.03	
3rd place, bronze medalist(s)	Héni Kechi	Tunisia	50.44	
4	Yvon Rakotoarimiandry	Madagascar	51.55	
5	Nabil Selmi	Algeria	52.12	
6	Tahar Ghozali	Algeria	52.26	
7	Arlindo Pinheiro	São Tomé and Príncipe	53.79	
	Selim Medersi	Tunisia	DNF	
