= Dinsdale Morgan =

Jamaican hurdler (born 1972)

Personal information
- Born: 19 November 1972 (age 53) Saint Elizabeth, Jamaica
- Height: 1.88 m (6 ft 2 in)
- Weight: 77 kg (170 lb)

Sport
- Sport: Running Track and field, Athletics
- Events: 400 metres, 400 metres hurdles
- College team: Pittsburg State University; Kansas City Kansas Community College

Achievements and titles
- Personal best: 400 m hurdles: 48.13
Medal record
Men's athletics
Representing Jamaica
World Indoor Championships
Silver medal – second place	1997 Paris	4×400 m relay
Commonwealth Games
Gold medal – first place	1998 Kuala Lumpur	400 m hurdles
CAC Games
Gold medal – first place	1998 Maracaibo	400 m hurdles
CAC Championships
Gold medal – first place	1997 San Juan	400 m hurdles

Dinsdale Morgan (born 19 November 1972) is a Jamaican athlete who competes in the 400-m hurdles.

His personal best time is 48.13 seconds, achieved in Rome in 1998.

Morgan met his wife, Jeanetta Lyle-Morgan, at Pittsburg State University. They have three children: Dinsdale Morgan Jr., JaMichael, and Jakaila Morgan. Dinsdale Jr. recently completed his collegiate career at the University of Kansas. JaMicheal is a professional basketball player in Kosovo.

== Achievements ==
Dinsdale earned honor of Jamaica’s Track and field Athlete and Sportsman of Year in 1999.

Year	Tournament	Venue	Result	Event
1996	Summer Olympics	Atlanta, United States	21st	400m hurdles
1997	World Indoor Championships	Paris, France	2nd	4x400m relay
1997	World Championships	Athens, Greece	7th	400m hurdles
1997	Central American and Caribbean Championships	San Juan, Puerto Rico	1st	400m hurdles
1998	Commonwealth Games	Kuala Lumpur, Malaysia	1st	400m hurdles
1998	Central American and Caribbean Games	Maracaibo, Venezuela	1st	400m hurdles
1998	IAAF Grand Prix Final	Moscow, Russia	2nd	400m hurdles
1999	World Championships	Seville, Spain	7th	400m hurdles
2000	Summer Olympics	Sydney, Australia	22nd	400m hurdles
2002	Commonwealth Games	Manchester, England	5th	400m hurdles
