= Dennis Darling =

Bahamian athlete

Personal information
- Born: 6 May 1975 (age 51) Nassau, Bahamas

Sport
- Sport: Track and field
- Club: Houston Cougars
Medal record
Men's athletics
Representing Bahamas
World Championships
| Bronze medal – third place | 2003 Paris | 4x400 m relay |
Central American and Caribbean Games
| Bronze medal – third place | 1998 Maracaibo | 4x400 m relay |
CARIFTA Games Junior (U20)
| Bronze medal – third place | 1994 Bridgetown | 400 m |
| Bronze medal – third place | 1994 Bridgetown | 4x100 m relay |

Dennis Theodore Darling (born 6 May 1975) is a Bahamian former athlete who specialized in the 400 metres. He is currently a track and field assistant coach at Texas Christian University.

Darling competed in 400 metres at the 1997 World Championships, where he was knocked out in the heats with 47.96 seconds. By 2003, his best season, he had lowered his personal best by over two seconds and achieved 45.83 seconds. He ran for the Bahamian 4 x 400 metres relay team at the 2003 World Championships, who were promoted from fourth to third place after the USA was stripped of the gold medal because Calvin Harrison was found guilty of a doping violation.

In 2004 he finished fifth in 4 x 400 metres relay at the 2004 World Indoor Championships, together with teammates Chris Brown, Timothy Munnings and Andretti Bain. Darling then ran for the Bahamian 4 x 400 metres relay team in the 2004 Olympics, but only in the qualifying heat.

Darling is married to fellow Bahamian track and field athlete Tonique Williams-Darling. Darling is the older brother of former NFL wide receiver Devard Darling. He is also the cousin of Bahamian Olympic triple jumper Frank Rutherford. He also coaches alongside Arizona State University All-American Jordan Durham.
