= Monte Raymond =

Canadian hurdler

Monté Raymond
Personal information
- Born: 18 November 1973 (age 52)

Sport
- Sport: Athletics
- Event: 400 m hurdles
- College team: Southern University at New Orleans; University of Iowa

Monte Raymond (born 18 November 1973) is a retired Canadian athlete who specialised in the 400 metres hurdles. He represented his country at the 1999 and 2001 World Championships.

His personal best in the event is 49.64 seconds set in Flagstaff in 1999.

== Competition record ==
Year	Competition	Venue	Position	Event	Notes
Representing Canada
1994	Jeux de la Francophonie	Bondoufle, France	17th (h)	400 m hurdles	54.09
1994	Commonwealth Games	Victoria, British Columbia, Canada	14th (h)	400 m hurdles	51.84
1998	Commonwealth Games	Kuala Lumpur, Malaysia	12th (h)	400 m hurdles	50.34
1998	Commonwealth Games	Kuala Lumpur, Malaysia	8th	4 × 400 m relay	3:04.84
1999	Universiade	Palma de Mallorca, Spain	17th (h)	400 m hurdles	50.87
1999	Universiade	Palma de Mallorca, Spain	6th (h)	4 × 400 m relay	3:07.26
1999	Pan American Games	Winnipeg, Manitoba, Canada	7th	400 m hurdles	49.80
1999	Pan American Games	Winnipeg, Manitoba, Canada	5th	4 × 400 m relay	3:03.06
1999	World Championships	Seville, Spain	39th (h)	400 m hurdles	50.75
1999	World Championships	Seville, Spain	17th (h)	4 × 400 m relay	3:05.60
2001	Jeux de la Francophonie	Ottawa, Ontario, Canada	4th	400 m hurdles	49.91
2001	World Championships	Edmonton, Alberta, Canada	33rd (h)	400 m hurdles	50.71
