= Omar Brown (sprinter, born 1975) =

Jamaican hurdler and sprinter (born 1975)

Personal information
- Born: 26 December 1975 (age 50)

Sport
- Country: Jamaica
- Sport: Athletics
- Event: 400 metres hurdles
Medal record
Men's athletics
Representing Jamaica
World Championships
Silver medal – second place	1999 Seville	4 × 400 m relay

Omar A. Brown (born 26 December 1975) is a Jamaican hurdler and sprinter. He was 6th in the 400 metres hurdles at the 1999 Pan American Games and won a silver medal for Jamaica at the 1999 World Championships in Athletics by virtue of running on their 4 × 400 m relay team in the semi-finals.

== Career ==
Brown attended Vere Technical High School in Clarendon Parish, Jamaica. Representing Vere Tech, Brown won the high school boys' Championship of America 4 × 400 m relay at the 1994 Penn Relays in a time of 3:10.61 minutes.

Brown ran for the Oklahoma Sooners track and field program and later convinced Michael Blackwood to attend the University of Oklahoma as well. They were both members of the school's 4 × 400 metres relay; the two frequently spoke Jamaican patois to each other and were not understood by other members of the team.

Brown began running for the Sooners as a freshman in 1996. He didn't compete for much of the 1997 NCAA season due to injuries, but finished 3rd at the Big 12 Conference Championships in the 400 m hurdles with a 51.39-second time.

Brown didn't advance to the 1998 Big 12 Conference finals in the indoor 400 m. At the 1998 Big 12 Conference outdoor championships, Brown won the 400 metres hurdles in 48.98 seconds, breaking Gregg Byram's 19-year-old school record. He was voted Trackwire men's national athlete of the week on 30 May for the performance. Going into the 1998 NCAA Division I Outdoor Track and Field Championships, Brown was favored to win the 400 m hurdles. His coach said he was one of the top five 400 m hurdlers in the world that year. At the championships, Brown finished runner-up to eventual 2000 Olympic gold medalist Angelo Taylor, running 49.38 seconds. In addition to the 400 m hurdles, Brown also competed for Oklahoma in the 4 × 100 m and 4 × 400 m relays at the 1998 NCAA Championships, finishing 5th in the 4 × 400 m. He went on to run at the 1998 Jamaican Athletics Championships, placing 7th in the 400 m hurdles.

Brown won the 1999 Big 12 indoor championships in the 600 yards and qualified for the 400 m at the 1999 NCAA Division I Indoor Track and Field Championships, but did not advance to the finals. He was 4th in the 400 m hurdles at the 1999 outdoor conference championships and did not advance from the 400 m hurdles rounds at the 1999 NCAA Division I Outdoor Track and Field Championships.

Brown competed in the 1999 Jamaican Athletics Championships in both the 400 m hurdles and flat 400 m, finishing 4th and 5th respectively. He qualified to represent Jamaica at the 1999 Pan American Games 400 m hurdles, finishing 6th in the finals in 49.37 seconds. Brown was selected on the Jamaican 4 × 400 m team in the semi-finals at the 1999 World Championships in Seville. With Brown on third leg, the team placed 3rd in their heat to advance to the finals on time. In the finals, Brown and Paston Coke were replaced by Greg Haughton and Danny McFarlane, and the Jamaican team won the bronze medal in 2:59.34 minutes. Their medal was later upgraded to silver after the United States winning team was disqualified for doping.

Brown continued competing on the international circuit in 2000, finishing 6th in the 400 m hurdles at the Grand Prix Brasil de Atletismo, 7th at the Notturna di Milano, and 5th at the Ericsson GP. Though he didn't advance to the flat 400 m finals at the Jamaican Athletics Championships, Brown was 7th at the national 400 m hurdles finals. He was disqualified in the flat 400 m at the 2001 Jamaican Athletics Championships and did not finish his 400 m hurdles heat.

== Personal life ==
Brown is from Saint Mary Parish, Jamaica. At Vere Technical High School, he was classmates with Michael Blackwood; they ran on the school's track and field team and played cricket together (both as bowlers).
