= Ockert Cilliers =

South African hurdler

Medal record

Men's athletics

Representing South Africa

African Championships
Gold medal – first place	2008 Addis Ababa	4×400 m
Bronze medal – third place	2004 Brazzaville	400 m hurdles

Ockert Cilliers (born 21 April 1981) is a South African 400 m hurdler. Born in Vanderbijlpark, Cilliers now lives in Sydney (Australia). He is 1.84 m tall and weighs 74 kg.

His athletics career started in 1996 at school, where he also played rugby union. The rugby coach forced all players to take part in athletics as well. Cilliers chose 200m and 300m hurdles, and hurdling quickly became his primary interest.

He is a member of the Fenerbahçe S.K. athletics club in Turkey.

His current coach is Dr. Ria van den Berg.

== Competition record ==
Year	Competition	Venue	Position	Event	Notes
Representing South Africa
2000	World Junior Championships	Santiago, Chile	3rd	400m hurdles	50.58
2003	World Championships	Paris, France	17th (sf)	400 m hurdles	49.32
2003	World Championships	Paris, France	10th (h)	4 × 400 m relay	3:03.05
2004	African Championships	Brazzaville, Republic of the Congo	3rd	400m hurdles	49.58
2004	Olympic Games	Athens, Greece	16th (sf)	400 m hurdles	49.01
2004	Olympic Games	Athens, Greece	–	4 × 400 m relay	DNF
2005	World Championships	Helsinki, Finland	13th (h)	4 × 400 m relay	3:04.64
2007	Universiade	Bangkok, Thailand	4th	400 m hurdles	49.36
2007	Universiade	Bangkok, Thailand	4th	4 × 400 m relay	3:06.44
2008	African Championships	Addis Ababa, Ethiopia	4th	400m hurdles	49.93
2008	African Championships	Addis Ababa, Ethiopia	1st	4 × 400 m relay	3:03.58
