= Athletics at the 1999 Pan American Games – Men's 400 metres hurdles =

Men's 400 metres hurdles at the Pan American Games

The men's 400 metres hurdles event at the 1999 Pan American Games was held July 27–28.

== Medalists ==
Gold	Silver	Bronze
Eronilde de Araújo; Brazil	Eric Thomas; United States	Torrance Zellner; United States

== Results ==
=== Heats ===
Qualification: First 3 of each heat (Q) and the next 2 fastest (q) qualified for the final.

Rank	Heat	Name	Nationality	Time	Notes
1	2	Eric Thomas	United States	48.71	Q
2	1	Eronilde de Araújo	Brazil	48.83	Q
2	2	Félix Sánchez	Dominican Republic	48.83	Q
4	1	Torrance Zellner	United States	49.35	Q
5	2	Cleverson da Silva	Brazil	49.68	Q
6	2	Omar A. Brown	Jamaica	49.85	q
7	2	Alexandre Marchand	Canada	49.97	q
8	1	Monte Raymond	Canada	50.02	Q
9	1	Carlos Zbinden	Chile	50.26	
10	1	Victor Houston	Barbados	50.73	
11	2	Paul Tucker	Guyana	51.09	
	2	Jhon Etienne	Haiti	DNF	
	1	Domingo Cordero	Puerto Rico	DNS	

=== Final ===
Rank	Name	Nationality	Time	Notes
1st place, gold medalist(s)	Eronilde de Araújo	Brazil	48.23	GR
2nd place, silver medalist(s)	Eric Thomas	United States	48.40	
3rd place, bronze medalist(s)	Torrance Zellner	United States	48.45	
4	Félix Sánchez	Dominican Republic	48.60	
5	Cleverson da Silva	Brazil	49.10	
6	Omar A. Brown	Jamaica	49.37	
7	Monte Raymond	Canada	49.80	
8	Alexandre Marchand	Canada	50.10	
