= Athletics at the 1998 Commonwealth Games – Men's 400 metres hurdles =

Men's 400 metres hurdles at the Commonwealth Games

The men's 400 metres hurdles event at the 1998 Commonwealth Games was held 16–18 September on National Stadium, Bukit Jalil.

== Medalists ==
Gold	Silver	Bronze
Dinsdale Morgan; Jamaica	Rohan Robinson; Australia	Kenneth Harnden; Zimbabwe

== Results ==
=== Heats ===
Qualification: First 2 of each heat (Q) and the next 2 fastest (q) qualified for the final.

Rank	Heat	Name	Nationality	Time	Notes
1	1	Rohan Robinson	Australia	49.29	Q
2	1	Erick Keter	Kenya	49.57	Q
3	2	Dinsdale Morgan	Jamaica	49.60	Q
4	1	Wayne Whyte	Jamaica	49.75	q
5	2	Victor Houston	Barbados	49.87	Q
6	3	Zid Abou Hamed	Australia	49.94	Q
7	3	Kenneth Harnden	Zimbabwe	49.96	Q
8	3	Kemel Thompson	Jamaica	49.97	q
9	1	Anthony Borsumato	England	50.15	
10	2	Matthew Beckenham	Australia	50.19	
11	2	Matthew Douglas	Northern Ireland	50.20	
12	2	Monte Raymond	Canada	50.34	
13	3	Alexandre Marchand	Canada	50.65	
14	1	Zion Armstrong	New Zealand	50.77	
15	1	Laurier Primeau	Canada	50.80	
16	2	Gary Jennings	England	50.94	
17	1	Essel Mensah	Ghana	51.89	
18	3	Muhamad Amin	Pakistan	52.01	
19	1	Matthew Elias	Wales	52.34	
20	3	Rudy Tirvengadum	Mauritius	53.80	
	2	Jovesa Naivalu	Fiji	DNS	
	2	Stephen Banane	Seychelles	DNS	
	3	Paul Gray	Wales	DNS	

=== Final ===
Rank	Name	Nationality	Time	Notes
1st place, gold medalist(s)	Dinsdale Morgan	Jamaica	48.28	GR
2nd place, silver medalist(s)	Rohan Robinson	Australia	48.99	
3rd place, bronze medalist(s)	Kenneth Harnden	Zimbabwe	49.06	
4	Zid Abou Hamed	Australia	49.11	SB
5	Victor Houston	Barbados	49.21	PB
6	Kemel Thompson	Jamaica	49.81	
7	Erick Keter	Kenya	49.98	
8	Wayne Whyte	Jamaica	51.10	
