= Llewellyn Herbert =

South African hurdler

Personal information
- Born: 21 July 1977 (age 48) Bethal, South Africa
Medal record
Men's athletics
Representing South Africa
Olympic Games
Bronze medal – third place	2000 Sydney	400 m hurdles
World Championships
Silver medal – second place	1997 Athens	400 m hurdles
African Championships
Gold medal – first place	2002 Radès	400 m hurdles
Gold medal – first place	2004 Brazzaville	400 m hurdles
Goodwill Games
Silver medal – second place	2001 Brisbane	400 m hurdles
Universiade
Gold medal – first place	1997 Catania	400 m hurdles
World Junior Championships
Silver medal – second place	1996 Sydney	400 m hurdles

Llewellyn Herbert (born 21 July 1977 in Bethal) is a South African athlete competing over 400 metres hurdles. He won an Olympic bronze medal in 2000 and set five national records over the distance.

== Achievements ==
Year	Competition	Venue	Position	Event	Notes
1996	Olympic Games	Atlanta, United States	45th (h)	400 m hurdles	51.13
1996	World Junior Championships	Sydney, Australia	2nd	400 m hurdles	49.15
1996	World Junior Championships	Sydney, Australia	11th (h)	4 × 100 m relay	40.54
1997	World Championships	Athens, Greece	2nd	400 m hurdles	47.86
1997	World Championships	Athens, Greece	4th	4 × 400 m relay	3:00.26
1997	Universiade	Catania, Italy	1st	400 m hurdles	48.99
1997	Universiade	Catania, Italy	4th	4 × 400 m relay	3:05.33
2000	Olympic Games	Sydney, Australia	3rd	400 m hurdles	47.81
2000	Olympic Games	Sydney, Australia	7th (sf)	4 × 400 m relay	3:01.25
2001	World Championships	Edmonton, Canada	25th (h)	400 m hurdles	50.28
2001	Goodwill Games	Brisbane, Australia	2nd	400 m hurdles	48.93
2002	African Championships	Radès, Tunisia	1st	400 m hurdles	49.76
2003	World Championships	Paris, France	8th	400 m hurdles	62.10
2004	African Championships	Brazzaville, Congo	1st	400 m hurdles	48.90
2004	Olympic Games	Athens, Greece	12th (sf)	400 m hurdles	48.57
2005	World Championships	Helsinki, Finland	23rd (sf)	400 m hurdles	50.69

== Affiliations ==
- TuksSport – University of Pretoria, South Africa
