= 2004 African Championships in Athletics – Men's 400 metres hurdles =

The men's 400 metres hurdles event at the 2004 African Championships in Athletics was held in Brazzaville, Republic of the Congo on July 17–18.

== Medalists ==
Gold	Silver	Bronze
Llewellyn Herbert; South Africa	Julius Bungei; Kenya	Ockert Cilliers; South Africa

== Results ==
=== Heats ===
Rank	Heat	Name	Nationality	Time	Notes
1	1	Llewellyn Herbert	South Africa	50.26	Q
2	1	Ibrahima Maïga	Mali	50.39	Q, NR
3	1	Ibou Faye	Senegal	50.62	Q
4	1	Chérif Issa	Benin	53.23	
1	2	Julius Bungei	Kenya	50.20	Q
2	2	Ockert Cilliers	South Africa	51.27	Q
3	2	Hamid Ben Hammou	Morocco	51.46	Q
4	2	Kamel Tabbal	Tunisia	51.59	q
5	2	Ibrahim Tondi	Niger	52.43	q, NR
6	2	Oumar Diarra	Mali	52.45	
7	2	Lensley Juhel	Mauritius	55.71	

=== Final ===
Rank	Name	Nationality	Time	Notes
1st place, gold medalist(s)	Llewellyn Herbert	South Africa	48.90	
2nd place, silver medalist(s)	Julius Bungei	Kenya	49.56	
3rd place, bronze medalist(s)	Ockert Cilliers	South Africa	49.58	
4	Ibrahima Maïga	Mali	50.27	NR
5	Ibou Faye	Senegal	50.69	
6	Kamel Tabbal	Tunisia	51.98	
7	Hamid Ben Hammou	Morocco	52.31	
8	Ibrahim Tondi	Niger	52.75	
