= Yvon Rakotoarimiandry =

Malagasy hurdler

Medal record

Men's athletics

Representing Madagascar

African Championships
Bronze medal – third place	2000 Algiers	400 m hurdles

Yvon Rakotoarimiandry (born 5 January 1976), is a retired Malagasy athlete who specialised in the 400 metres hurdles. He represented Madagascar at the 2000 Summer Olympics narrowly missing the semifinals.

His personal best of 49.53 (2001) is the current national record.

== Competition record ==
Year	Competition	Venue	Position	Event	Notes
Representing Madagascar
1994	World Junior Championships	Lisbon, Portugal	36th (h)	400 m hurdles	54.06
1999	All-Africa Games	Johannesburg, South Africa	5th	400 m hurdles	49.91
2000	African Championships	Algiers, Algeria	3rd	400 m hurdles	50.39
2000	Olympic Games	Sydney, Australia	22nd (h)	400 m hurdles	50.15
2001	Jeux de la Francophonie	Ottawa, Canada	2nd	400 m hurdles	49.53
2001	World Championships	Edmonton, Canada	19th (sf)	400 m hurdles	49.81
2002	African Championships	Radès, Tunisia	4th	400 m hurdles	51.55
