= Edivaldo Monteiro =

Guinea-Bissau-born Portuguese hurdler (born 1976)

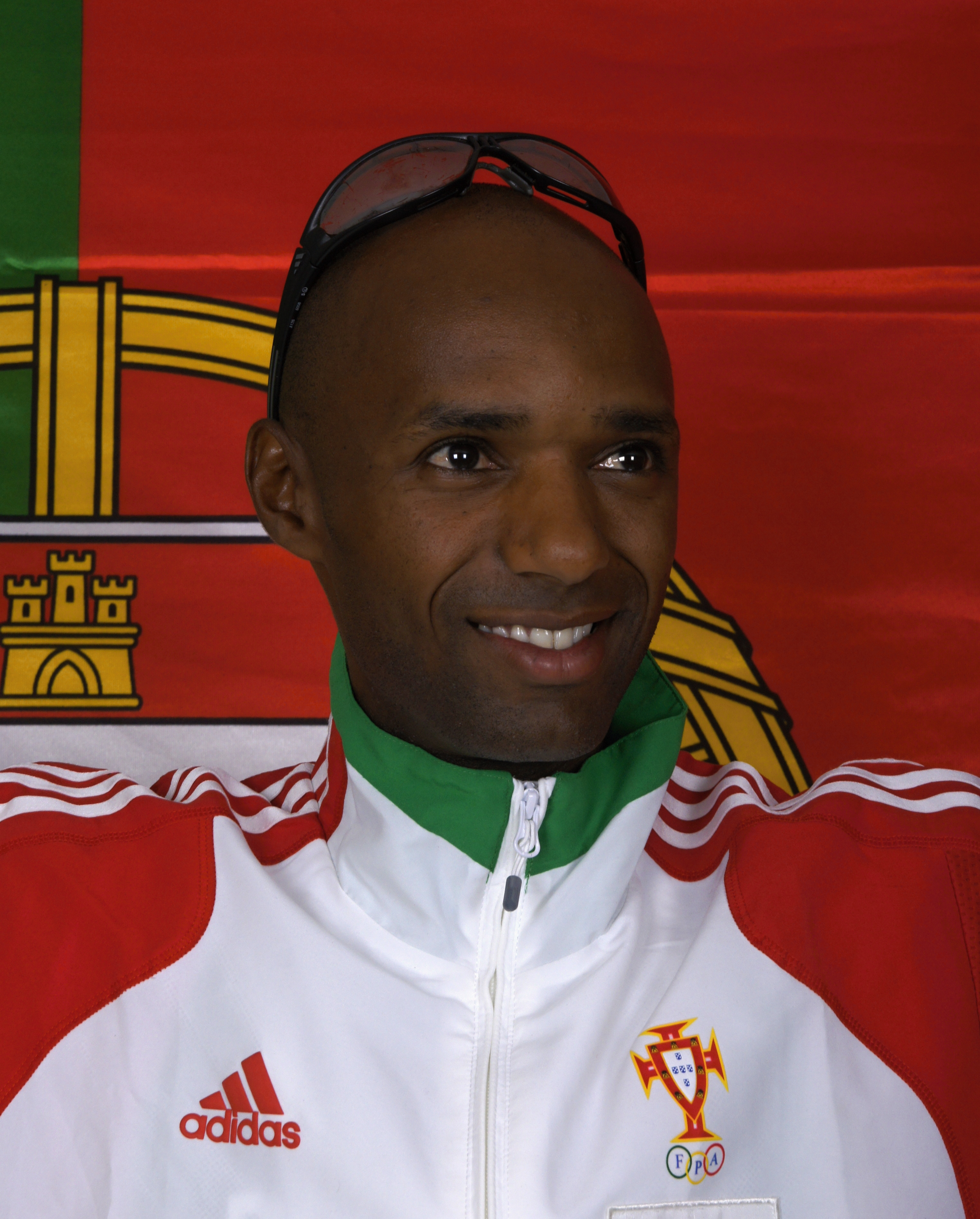

Personal information
- Born: 28 April 1976 (age 50) Guinea-Bissau
- Height: 1.80 m (5 ft 11 in)
- Weight: 70 kg (154 lb)

Sport
- Sport: Running
- Event: 400 metres hurdles
- Club: Sporting Lisbon

Edivaldo Isaías Carvalho Évora Monteiro (born 28 April 1976) is a Guinea-Bissau-born Portuguese hurdler.

He competed at the World Championships in 2001, 2003 and 2005 as well as the Olympic Games in 2004 and 2008 without reaching the final.

His personal best time is 49.10 seconds, achieved in June 2004 in Bern.

== Competition record ==
Year	Competition	Venue	Position	Event	Notes
Representing Guinea-Bissau
1998	Ibero-American Championships	Lisbon, Portugal	12th (h)	400 m hurdles	50.95
Representing Portugal
2001	World Championships	Edmonton, Canada	29th (h)	400 m hurdles	50.42
2002	European Championships	Munich, Germany	11th (sf)	400 m hurdles	49.75
2003	World Championships	Paris, France	29th (h)	400 m hurdles	50.31
2004	Ibero-American Championships	Huelva, Spain	2nd	400 m hurdles	49.31
2004	Olympic Games	Athens, Greece	18th (h)	400 m hurdles	49.26
2005	World Championships	Helsinki, Finland	–	400 m hurdles	DNF
2006	Lusophony Games	Macau, China	3rd	400 m hurdles	51.66
2007	World Championships	Osaka, Japan	14th (sf)	400 m hurdles	49.31
2008	Olympic Games	Beijing, China	20th (h)	400 m hurdles	49.89
2018	World Masters Championships	Málaga, Spain	3rd	M40 110 m hurdles	14.81
