= Willie Smith (hurdler) =

Namibian hurdler

Personal information
- Born: 20 September 1977 (age 49)

Sport
- Sport: Track and field
Medal record
Representing Namibia
African Championships
Silver medal – second place	2002 Radès	400 m hurdles

Willie Smith (born 20 September 1977) is a retired Namibian athlete who specialised in the 400 metres hurdles. He represented his country at the 2000 Summer Olympics failing to qualify for the semifinals.

His personal best of 49.05 (2001) is the current national record.

== Competition record ==
Year	Competition	Venue	Position	Event	Notes
Representing Namibia
1996	World Junior Championships	Sydney, Australia	7th	400m hurdles	51.83
1996	World Junior Championships	Sydney, Australia	13th (h)	4 × 100 m relay	40.84
1997	World Championships	Athens, Greece	42nd (h)	400 m hurdles	51.12
1997	Universiade	Catania, Italy	–	400 m hurdles	DNF
1997	Universiade	Catania, Italy	13th (h)	4 × 400 m relay	3:15.13
2000	Olympic Games	Sydney, Australia	35th (h)	400 m hurdles	50.89
2002	Commonwealth Games	Manchester, United Kingdom	6th	400 m hurdles	50.14
2002	African Championships	Radès, Tunisia	2nd	400 m hurdles	50.03
