= Tonique Williams-Darling =

Bahamian sprinter

Personal information
- Born: January 17, 1976 (age 50) Nassau, Bahamas

Sport
- Sport: Track and field
- Club: South Carolina Gamecocks
Medal record
Women's athletics
Representing Bahamas
Olympic Games
Gold medal – first place	2004 Athens	400 m
World Championships
Gold medal – first place	2005 Helsinki	400 m
World Indoor Championships
Bronze medal – third place	2004 Budapest	400 m
Commonwealth Games
Silver medal – second place	2006 Melbourne	400 m
Central American and Caribbean Championships in Athletics
Gold medal – first place	2005 Nassau	400 m
Silver medal – second place	1999 Bridgetown	400 m
Silver medal – second place	2005 Nassau	4 × 400 m relay
Bronze medal – third place	2003 St.George's	200 m
CARIFTA Games Junior (U20)
Gold medal – first place	1995 George Town	4 × 100 m relay
Silver medal – second place	1992 Nassau	4 × 400 m relay
Silver medal – second place	1993 Fort-de-France	4 × 100 m relay
Silver medal – second place	1993 Fort-de-France	4 × 400 m relay
Silver medal – second place	1994 Bridgetown	400 m
Silver medal – second place	1994 Bridgetown	4 × 100 m relay
Silver medal – second place	1994 Bridgetown	4 × 400 m relay
Silver medal – second place	1995 George Town	400 m
Silver medal – second place	1995 George Town	4 × 400 m relay

Tonique Williams-Darling (née Williams; January 17, 1976) is a Bahamian sprint athlete. She won the gold medal in the 400 meters at the 2004 Summer Olympics in Athens, Greece. After the Olympics, she won the IAAF Golden League jackpot, splitting the US$1M pot with Christian Olsson.

== Early life and education ==
Williams attended secondary school at St. John's College, Nassau, Bahamas. She then attended the University of Georgia before transferring to the University of South Carolina where she graduated with a business degree in 1999.

== Athletics career ==
Williams-Darling had a breakout year in 2004. She started with a bronze medal at the 2004 IAAF World Indoor Championships in Budapest, Hungary, running a personal best behind Russia's Natalya Nazarova and Olesya Krasnomovets. Then in July, at the Rome meeting of the IAAF Golden League, Tonique broke Mexican world champion Ana Guevara's 23 race winning streak in the 400 meter race.

At the 2004 Summer Olympics in Athens, Greece Williams-Darling beat Guevara again. In a head-to-head final straight, she proved to be more powerful than the Mexican runner who had been hampered with injuries and trained only on a limited basis prior to the Games. Winning the race, she became the Bahamas' first individual Olympic gold medalist.

After the Olympics she secured the win in the overall Golden League-jackpot, cashing in US$500,000 after splitting the US$1M pot with Christian Olsson.

She also won the gold medal in the 400 meters at 2005 World Championships in Athletics, in a head-to-head race with American 400-meter specialist Sanya Richards. At the 2006 Commonwealth Games, despite being the favourite, she was beaten unexpectedly both in her semi-final and the final by Christine Ohuruogu of England, claiming silver instead.

Williams-Darling took the 2007 season off to nurse a hamstring injury and did not compete during the 2008 season.

== Professional career ==
Williams-Darling coaching briefly after retiring from competition. In November 2012, she was elected as Public Relations Director of the Bahamas Association of Athletic Associations (BAAA) for the period 2012–2015. In 2015, Williams-Darling served as senior director of event media services for the BTC/IAAF World Relays in the Bahamas.

In 2025, Williams-Darling was working as a public relations officer at the Bahamas' National Insurance Board when she was selected for the World Athletics’ Media Academy Class of 2025, which would also involve commentating during the World Championships in Tokyo.

== Personal life ==
Williams is married to fellow Bahamian track and field athlete Dennis Darling, making her the sister-in-law of his brother, former NFL wide receiver, Devard Darling.

== Awards and honours ==
In 2009 Williams-Darling was inducted into the University of South Carolina's Athletic Hall of Fame.

For her achievements to date, the Bahamas Government honoured her by naming a major highway the Tonique Williams-Darling Highway.
