= 2000 World Junior Championships in Athletics – Men's 400 metres hurdles =

The men's 400 metres hurdles event at the 2000 World Junior Championships in Athletics was held in Santiago, Chile, at Estadio Nacional Julio Martínez Prádanos on 18, 19 and 21 October.

== Medalists ==
Gold	Marek Plawgo; Poland
Silver	Pieter de Villiers; South Africa
Bronze	Ockert Cilliers; South Africa

== Results ==
=== Final ===
21 October

Rank	Name	Nationality	Time	Notes
1st place, gold medalist(s)	Marek Plawgo	Poland	49.23	
2nd place, silver medalist(s)	Pieter de Villiers	South Africa	50.52	
3rd place, bronze medalist(s)	Ockert Cilliers	South Africa	50.58	
4	Christian Duma	Germany	50.60	
5	Yevgeniy Meleshenko	Kazakhstan	51.05	
6	Mikael Jakobsson	Sweden	51.48	
7	Loïc Clément	France	52.26	
8	Sean Avery	Australia	54.95	

=== Semifinals ===
19 October

==== Semifinal 1 ====
Rank	Name	Nationality	Time	Notes
1	Marek Plawgo	Poland	50.40	Q
2	Ockert Cilliers	South Africa	51.32	Q
3	Loïc Clément	France	51.76	Q
4	Sean Avery	Australia	51.83	Q
5	Masakatsu Tanaka	Japan	51.94	
6	Luis Montenegro	Chile	52.50	
7	Sebastian Linke	Germany	52.57	
8	Ragnar Bergheim	Norway	52.81	

==== Semifinal 2 ====
Rank	Name	Nationality	Time	Notes
1	Pieter de Villiers	South Africa	50.21	Q
2	Yevgeniy Meleshenko	Kazakhstan	50.72	Q
3	Christian Duma	Germany	51.10	Q
4	Mikael Jakobsson	Sweden	51.13	Q
5	Federico Rubeca	Italy	51.31	
6	Jorge Chaverra	Colombia	51.88	
7	David Cappellano	Australia	52.24	
8	William da Silva	Brazil	55.54	

=== Heats ===
18 October

==== Heat 1 ====
Rank	Name	Nationality	Time	Notes
1	Christian Duma	Germany	50.86	Q
2	Pieter de Villiers	South Africa	50.90	Q
3	Yevgeniy Meleshenko	Kazakhstan	51.07	Q
4	Federico Rubeca	Italy	51.93	q
5	Luis Montenegro	Chile	52.34	q
6	Zulkarnain Purba	Indonesia	53.32	
7	Jonathan Gibson	Panama	54.73	
	Eliseu de Sena	Brazil	DQ	IAAF rule 168.7

==== Heat 2 ====
Rank	Name	Nationality	Time	Notes
1	Masakatsu Tanaka	Japan	51.95	Q
2	Ockert Cilliers	South Africa	51.95	Q
3	Sebastian Linke	Germany	52.13	Q
4	William da Silva	Brazil	52.56	q
5	Pablo Martínez	Spain	52.72	
	Jeffrey Christie	United Kingdom	DQ	IAAF rule 168.7
	Yevgeniy Mikheyko	Belarus	DQ	IAAF rule 168.7

==== Heat 3 ====
Rank	Name	Nationality	Time	Notes
1	Marek Plawgo	Poland	51.74	Q
2	Sean Avery	Australia	51.85	Q
3	Loïc Clément	France	52.00	Q
4	Ragnar Bergheim	Norway	52.46	q
5	Christopher Hickman	United States	53.08	
6	Daniel Kibet	Kenya	54.87	
	Álvaro Vallejo	Spain	DQ	IAAF rule 168.7

==== Heat 4 ====
Rank	Name	Nationality	Time	Notes
1	Mikael Jakobsson	Sweden	52.00	Q
2	Jorge Chaverra	Colombia	52.36	Q
3	David Cappellano	Australia	52.44	Q
4	Hisatoshi Hotta	Japan	52.89	
5	Sergey Mishchenko	Ukraine	52.97	
6	Roberto Córtez	El Salvador	54.08	
7	Greg Little	Jamaica	54.76	

== Participation ==
According to an unofficial count, 29 athletes from 23 countries participated in the event.

- Australia (2)
- Belarus (1)
- Brazil (2)
- Chile (1)
- Colombia (1)
- El Salvador (1)
- France (1)
- Germany (2)
- Indonesia (1)
- Italy (1)
- Jamaica (1)
- Japan (2)
- Kazakhstan (1)
- Kenya (1)
- Norway (1)
- Panama (1)
- Poland (1)
- South Africa (2)
- Spain (2)
- Sweden (1)
- Ukraine (1)
- United Kingdom (1)
- United States (1)
