= Athletics at the 2004 Summer Olympics – Men's 400 metres hurdles =

Men's 400 metres hurdles at the Games of the XXVIII Olympiad
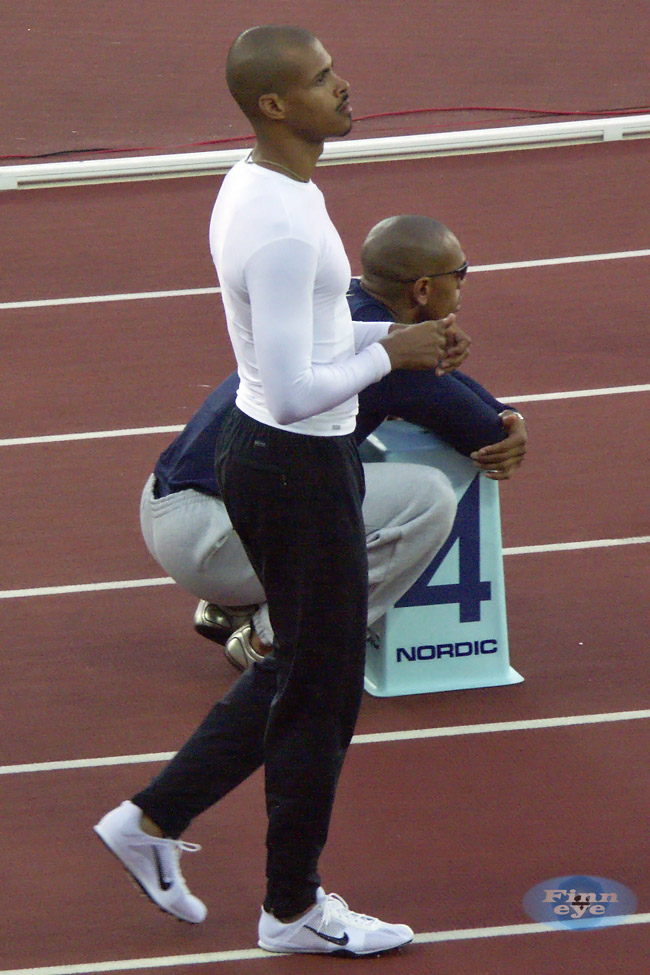
- Félix Sánchez (2005)
- Venue: Athens Olympic Stadium
- Dates: 23–26 August
- Competitors: 35 from 24 nations
- Winning time: 47.63

Medalists
| 1st place, gold medalist(s) | | Félix Sánchez; Dominican Republic |
| 2nd place, silver medalist(s) | | Danny McFarlane; Jamaica |
| 3rd place, bronze medalist(s) | | Naman Keïta; France |

Official Video

The men's 400 metres hurdles at the 2004 Summer Olympics as part of the athletics program were held at the Athens Olympic Stadium from August 23 to 26. There were 35 competitors from 24 nations. The event was won by Félix Sánchez of the Dominican Republic, the nation's first medal in the men's 400 metres hurdles. Silver went to Danny McFarlane of Jamaica, returning to the podium in the event for the first time since 1992. Naman Keïta's bronze was France's first medal in the event in over 100 years; the last Frenchman to medal in the long hurdles was Henri Tauzin in 1900. The United States' five-Games gold medal (and podium) streak ended; for only the second time in the history of the event, Americans competed but won no medals (after 1968, with the United States also not on the podium in 1980 due to the boycott).

== Background ==
This was the 23rd time the event was held. It had been introduced along with the men's 200 metres hurdles in 1900, with the 200 being dropped after 1904 and the 400 being held through 1908 before being left off the 1912 programme. However, when the Olympics returned in 1920 after World War I, the men's 400 metres hurdles was back and would continue to be contested at every Games thereafter.

The top four of the eight finalists from the 2000 Games returned: gold medalist Angelo Taylor of the United States, silver medalist Hadi Souan Somayli of Saudi Arabia, bronze medalist Llewellyn Herbert of South Africa, and fourth-place finisher James Carter of the United States. Félix Sánchez of the Dominican Republic had finished 20th in 2000, but had risen to prominence since as he won the 2001 and 2003 World Championships. He was the favorite in Athens. Defending champion Taylor made it to the semifinals but did not qualify for the final.

Belize, Kazakhstan, Mali, and Niger each made their debut in the event. The United States made its 22nd appearance, most of any nation, having missed only the boycotted 1980 Games.

== Summary ==
In the final, a false start had been accredited to at least three athletes including Dominican Republic's Félix Sánchez, a solid pre-race favorite in this event. Nonetheless, he sped out of the blocks, and quickly opened his lead over the American and fastest pre-Olympic entrant James Carter on the sixth hurdle. The two had chased against each other towards the final bend with Carter pulling ahead into the lead. As Carter went backwards in the last two hurdles, Sanchez left the field trailing to quickly move again to the front and maintained it to a blazing finish in his seasonal best at 47.63 seconds, extending his winning streak on his forty-third race since the previous defeat in 2001. Behind him, Jamaican hurdler Danny McFarlane and delighted Frenchman Naman Keïta edged Carter out to a ragged fourth to deny the American supremacy on the podium for the first time at a non-boycotted Games since 1968, giving both of them the silver and bronze respectively.

== Qualification ==
The qualification period for athletics was 1 January 2003 to 9 August 2004. For the men's 400 metres hurdles, each National Olympic Committee was permitted to enter up to three athletes that had run the race in 49.20 seconds or faster during the qualification period. The maximum number of athletes per nation had been set at 3 since the 1930 Olympic Congress. If an NOC had no athletes that qualified under that standard, one athlete that had run the race in 49.50 seconds or faster could be entered.

== Competition format ==
The competition used the three-round format used every Games since 1908 (except the four-round competition in 1952): quarterfinals, semifinals, and a final. The hurdles were 3 feet (91.5 centimetres) tall and were placed 35 metres apart beginning 45 metres from the starting line, resulting in a 40 metres home stretch after the last hurdle. The 400 metres track was standard.

There were 5 quarterfinal heats with 7 athletes each. The top 4 men in each quarterfinal advanced to the semifinals along with the next fastest 4 overall. The 24 semifinalists were divided into 3 semifinals of 8 athletes each, with the top 2 in each semifinal and the next 2 fastest overall advancing to the 8-man final.

== Records ==
Prior to the competition, the existing world record, Olympic record, and world leading time were as follows:

| World record | Kevin Young (USA) | 46.78 | Barcelona, Spain | 6 August 1992 |
| Olympic record | Kevin Young (USA) | 46.78 | Barcelona, Spain | 6 August 1992 |
| World Leading | James Carter (USA) | 47.68 | Sacramento, United States | 11 July 2004 |

No new world or Olympic records were set during the competition.

== Schedule ==
All times are Greece Standard Time (UTC+2)

| Date | Time | Round |
|---|---|---|
| Monday, 23 August 2004 | 19:30 | Quarterfinals |
| Tuesday, 24 August 2004 | 21:05 | Semifinals |
| Thursday, 26 August 2004 | 22:30 | Final |

== Results ==
=== Quarterfinals ===
Qualification rule: The first four finishers in each heat (Q) plus the next four fastest overall runners (q) advanced to the semifinals.

==== Quarterfinal 1 ====
| Rank | Lane | Athlete | Nation | Time | Notes |
|---|---|---|---|---|---|
| 1 | 8 | Angelo Taylor | United States | 48.79 | Q |
| 2 | 6 | Jiří Mužík | Czech Republic | 48.85 | Q, SB |
| 3 | 3 | Chris Rawlinson | Great Britain | 48.94 | Q |
| 4 | 5 | Boris Gorban | Russia | 49.25 | Q |
| 5 | 2 | Yevgeniy Meleshenko | Kazakhstan | 49.43 | q |
| 6 | 4 | Ken Yoshizawa | Japan | 50.95 | |
| 7 | 7 | Kurt Couto | Mozambique | 51.18 | NR |

==== Quarterfinal 2 ====
| Rank | Lane | Athlete | Nation | Time | Notes |
|---|---|---|---|---|---|
| 1 | 2 | Danny McFarlane | Jamaica | 48.53 | Q, SB |
| 2 | 3 | Bennie Brazell | United States | 48.57 | Q |
| 3 | 5 | Marek Plawgo | Poland | 48.67 | Q, SB |
| 4 | 4 | Llewellyn Herbert | South Africa | 48.70 | Q |
| 5 | 6 | Štěpán Tesařík | Czech Republic | 49.44 | q |
| 6 | 7 | Alaa Motar | Iraq | 51.97 | |
| — | 8 | Yacnier Luis | Cuba | DSQ | |

==== Quarterfinal 3 ====
| Rank | Lane | Athlete | Nation | Time | Notes |
|---|---|---|---|---|---|
| 1 | 8 | James Carter | United States | 48.64 | Q |
| 2 | 6 | Periklis Iakovakis | Greece | 48.69 | Q, SB |
| 3 | 7 | Dai Tamesue | Japan | 48.80 | Q |
| 4 | 4 | Eduardo Iván Rodríguez | Spain | 49.25 | Q |
| 5 | 2 | Bayano Kamani | Panama | 49.37 | q |
| 6 | 3 | Ibrahima Maïga | Mali | 50.63 | |
| 7 | 5 | Michael Aguilar | Belize | 51.21 | |

==== Quarterfinal 4 ====
| Rank | Lane | Athlete | Nation | Time | Notes |
|---|---|---|---|---|---|
| 1 | 2 | Félix Sánchez | Dominican Republic | 48.51 | Q |
| 2 | 5 | Alwyn Myburgh | South Africa | 48.84 | Q |
| 3 | 4 | Mikhail Lipsky | Russia | 49.00 | Q |
| 4 | 3 | Hadi Soua'an Al-Somaily | Saudi Arabia | 49.15 | Q, SB |
| 5 | 7 | Dean Griffiths | Jamaica | 49.41 | q |
| 6 | 6 | Cédric El-Idrissi | Switzerland | 49.44 | |
| 7 | 8 | Mowen Boino | Papua New Guinea | 50.97 | NR |

==== Quarterfinal 5 ====
| Rank | Lane | Athlete | Nation | Time | Notes |
|---|---|---|---|---|---|
| 1 | 8 | Kemel Thompson | Jamaica | 48.66 | Q, SB |
| 2 | 3 | Naman Keïta | France | 48.88 | Q |
| 3 | 2 | Ockert Cilliers | South Africa | 49.12 | Q |
| 4 | 4 | Edivaldo Monteiro | Portugal | 49.53 | Q |
| 5 | 6 | Ibrahim Al-Hamaidi | Saudi Arabia | 49.64 | |
| 6 | 5 | Matthew Douglas | Great Britain | 49.77 | |
| 7 | 7 | Ibrahim Tondi | Niger | 52.62 | |

=== Semifinals ===
Qualification rule: The first two finishers in each heat (Q) plus the next two fastest overall runners (q) moved on to the final.

==== Semifinal 1 ====
| Rank | Lane | Athlete | Nation | Time | Notes |
|---|---|---|---|---|---|
| 1 | 5 | Félix Sánchez | Dominican Republic | 47.93 | Q |
| 2 | 3 | Marek Plawgo | Poland | 48.16 | Q, NR |
| 3 | 6 | Alwyn Myburgh | South Africa | 48.21 | q, SB |
| 4 | 4 | Angelo Taylor | United States | 48.72 | |
| 5 | 7 | Hadi Soua'an Al-Somaily | Saudi Arabia | 48.98 | SB |
| 6 | 2 | Mikhail Lipskiy | Russia | 49.10 | |
| 7 | 1 | Edivaldo Monteiro | Portugal | 49.26 | |
| 8 | 8 | Dean Griffiths | Jamaica | 49.51 | |

==== Semifinal 2 ====
| Rank | Lane | Athlete | Nation | Time | Notes |
|---|---|---|---|---|---|
| 1 | 3 | Danny McFarlane | Jamaica | 48.00 | Q, PB |
| 2 | 5 | Bennie Brazell | United States | 48.19 | Q |
| 3 | 4 | Dai Tamesue | Japan | 48.46 | SB |
| 4 | 6 | Periklis Iakovakis | Greece | 48.47 | SB |
| 5 | 2 | Llewellyn Herbert | South Africa | 48.57 | |
| 6 | 8 | Eduardo Iván Rodríguez | Spain | 49.77 | |
| 7 | 7 | Štěpán Tesařík | Czech Republic | 49.87 | |
| 8 | 1 | Chris Rawlinson | Great Britain | 50.89 | |

==== Semifinal 3 ====
| Rank | Lane | Athlete | Nation | Time | Notes |
|---|---|---|---|---|---|
| 1 | 3 | James Carter | United States | 48.18 | Q |
| 2 | 7 | Bayano Kamani | Panama | 48.23 | Q, NR |
| 3 | 6 | Naman Keïta | France | 48.24 | q |
| 4 | 4 | Kemel Thompson | Jamaica | 48.25 | SB |
| 5 | 5 | Jiří Mužík | Czech Republic | 48.88 | |
| 6 | 1 | Ockert Cilliers | South Africa | 49.01 | |
| 7 | 2 | Boris Gorban | Russia | 49.46 | |
| 8 | 8 | Yevgeniy Meleshenko | Kazakhstan | 49.48 | |

=== Final ===
| Rank | Lane | Athlete | Nation | Time | Notes |
|---|---|---|---|---|---|
| 1st place, gold medalist(s) | 6 | Félix Sánchez | Dominican Republic | 47.63 | SB |
| 2nd place, silver medalist(s) | 5 | Danny McFarlane | Jamaica | 48.11 | |
| 3rd place, bronze medalist(s) | 7 | Naman Keïta | France | 48.26 | |
| 4 | 4 | James Carter | United States | 48.58 | |
| 5 | 2 | Bayano Kamani | Panama | 48.74 | |
| 6 | 3 | Marek Plawgo | Poland | 49.00 | |
| 7 | 1 | Alwyn Myburgh | South Africa | 49.07 | |
| 8 | 8 | Bennie Brazell | United States | 49.51 | |

== Results summary ==
| Rank | Athlete | Nation | Quarterfinals | Semifinals | Final | Notes |
|---|---|---|---|---|---|---|
| 1st place, gold medalist(s) | Félix Sánchez | Dominican Republic | 48.51 | 47.93 | 47.63 | SB |
| 2nd place, silver medalist(s) | Danny McFarlane | Jamaica | 48.53 | 48.00 | 48.11 | PB |
| 3rd place, bronze medalist(s) | Naman Keïta | France | 48.88 | 48.24 | 48.26 | |
| 4 | James Carter | United States | 48.64 | 48.18 | 48.58 | |
| 5 | Bayano Kamani | Panama | 49.37 | 48.23 | 48.74 | NR |
| 6 | Marek Plawgo | Poland | 48.67 | 48.16 | 49.00 | NR |
| 7 | Alwyn Myburgh | South Africa | 48.84 | 48.21 | 49.07 | SB |
| 8 | Bennie Brazell | United States | 48.57 | 48.19 | 49.51 | |
| 9 | Kemel Thompson | Jamaica | 48.66 | 48.25 | Did not advance | SB |
| 10 | Dai Tamesue | Japan | 48.80 | 48.46 | Did not advance | SB |
| 11 | Periklis Iakovakis | Greece | 48.69 | 48.47 | Did not advance | SB |
| 12 | Llewellyn Herbert | South Africa | 48.70 | 48.57 | Did not advance | |
| 13 | Angelo Taylor | United States | 48.79 | 48.72 | Did not advance | |
| 14 | Jiří Mužík | Czech Republic | 48.85 | 48.88 | Did not advance | SB |
| 15 | Hadi Soua'an Al-Somaily | Saudi Arabia | 49.15 | 48.98 | Did not advance | SB |
| 16 | Ockert Cilliers | South Africa | 49.12 | 49.01 | Did not advance | |
| 17 | Mikhail Lipskiy | Russia | 49.00 | 49.10 | Did not advance | |
| 18 | Edivaldo Monteiro | Portugal | 49.53 | 49.26 | Did not advance | |
| 19 | Boris Gorban | Russia | 49.25 | 49.46 | Did not advance | |
| 20 | Yevgeniy Meleshenko | Kazakhstan | 49.43 | 49.48 | Did not advance | |
| 21 | Dean Griffiths | Jamaica | 49.41 | 49.51 | Did not advance | |
| 22 | Eduardo Iván Rodríguez | Spain | 49.25 | 49.77 | Did not advance | |
| 23 | Štěpán Tesařík | Czech Republic | 49.44 | 49.87 | Did not advance | |
| 24 | Chris Rawlinson | Great Britain | 48.94 | 50.89 | Did not advance | |
| 25 | Cédric El-Idrissi | Switzerland | 49.44 | Did not advance | | |
| 26 | Ibrahim Al-Hamaidi | Saudi Arabia | 49.64 | Did not advance | | |
| 27 | Matthew Douglas | Great Britain | 49.77 | Did not advance | | |
| 28 | Ibrahima Maïga | Mali | 50.63 | Did not advance | | |
| 29 | Ken Yoshizawa | Japan | 50.95 | Did not advance | | |
| 30 | Mowen Boino | Papua New Guinea | 50.97 | Did not advance | | NR |
| 31 | Kurt Couto | Mozambique | 51.18 | Did not advance | | NR |
| 32 | Michael Aguilar | Belize | 51.21 | Did not advance | | |
| 33 | Alaa Motar | Iraq | 51.97 | Did not advance | | |
| 34 | Ibrahim Tondi | Niger | 52.62 | Did not advance | | |
| 35 | Yacnier Luis | Cuba | DSQ | Did not advance | | |
