= Héni Kechi =

French hurdler

Medal record

Men's athletics

Representing Tunisia

African Championships
Bronze medal – third place	2002 Radès	400 m hurdles

Héni Kechi (born 31 August 1980 in Djerba) is a French track and field athlete who specialises in the 400 metres hurdles.

== Achievements ==
Year	Competition	Venue	Position	Event	Notes
Representing Tunisia
2002	African Championships	Radès, Tunisia	3rd	400 m hurdles	50.44
Representing France
2005	Jeux de la Francophonie	Niamey, Niger	7th	400 m hurdles	51.85
2005	Jeux de la Francophonie	Niamey, Niger	4th	4 × 400 m relay	3:11.97
2006	European Championships	Gothenburg, Sweden	15th (sf)	400 m hurdles	50.78
2010	European Championships	Barcelona, Spain	4th	400 m hurdles	49.34
