= Anthony Borsumato =

British athlete (born 1973)

Tony Borsumato
Personal information
- Nationality: British (English)
- Born: 13 December 1973 (age 52) Middlesbrough, England
- Height: 187 cm (6 ft 2 in)
- Weight: 76 kg (168 lb)

Sport
- Sport: Athletics
- Event: Hurdles
- Club: Sale Harriers

Anthony Patrick Borsumato (born 13 December 1973) is a male former athlete from England who specialised in the 400 metres hurdles. He competed at the 2000 Summer Olympics.

== Biography ==
Borsumato represented Great Britain at the 2000 Summer Olympics, as well as three World Championships. He represented England in the 400 metres hurdles event, at the 1998 Commonwealth Games in Kuala Lumpur, Malaysia. Four years later he represented England again at the 2002 Commonwealth Games.

Borsumato was on the podium six times at the AAA Championships from 1998 to 2003.

His career came to an abrupt end when he broke his ankle during the semifinals of the 2003 World Championships in Athletics.

His personal best in the event is 48.90 from 2002.

== Competition record ==
Year	Competition	Venue	Position	Event	Notes
Representing the Great Britain and England
1998	European Championships	Budapest, Hungary	22nd (h)	400 m hurdles	50.91
1998	Commonwealth Games	Kuala Lumpur, Malaysia	9th (h)	400 m hurdles	50.15
1999	World Championships	Seville, Spain	30th (h)	400 m hurdles	50.05
2000	Olympic Games	Sydney, Australia	32nd (h)	400 m hurdles	50.73
2001	World Championships	Edmonton, Canada	16th (sf)	400 m hurdles	49.48
2002	Commonwealth Games	Manchester, United Kingdom	4th	400 m hurdles	49.72
2002	European Championships	Munich, Germany	6th (sf)	400 m hurdles	49.37
2003	World Championships	Paris, France	19th (h)	400 m hurdles	49.16
