= Alaa Motar =

Iraqi hurdler

Personal information
- Nationality: Iraqi
- Born: 22 November 1980 (age 45)

Sport
- Sport: Track and field
- Event: 400 metres hurdles

Alaa Motar (born 22 November 1980) is an Iraqi hurdler. He competed in the men's 400 metres hurdles at the 2004 Summer Olympics.
