= DeVon Bean =

Bermudan sprinter (born 1975)

Personal information
- Born: 13 September 1975 (age 51)

Sport
- Sport: Track and field

DeVon Bean (born 13 September 1975) is a former Bermudan sprinter and Olympian.

DeVon Bean competed in the men's 100m competition at the 1996 Summer Olympics. He recorded a time of 10.89 seconds, but did not qualify past the heat stages. His personal best, 10.27 seconds, was set in the same year and is the Bermudian National record for the 100m distance.

At the 2000 Summer Olympics, DeVon recorded a 7.88m long jump, and placed 7th overall.

== Activity After Competing ==
Devon Bean is now a track coach in Bermuda.

== Outdoor records ==
DISCIPLINE	PERFORMANCE	WIND	PLACE	DATE
100 Metres	10.27	0.0	Glendora (USA)	11 MAY 1996
200 Metres	21.16	+0.2	Lafayette (USA)	10 MAY 1998
Long Jump	7.88	+1.7	Flagstaff, AZ (USA)	08 JUL 2000

== Indoor records ==
Indoor	PERFORMANCE	PLACE	DATE
55 Metres	6.41	Lubbock, TX (USA)	26 JAN 2002
60 Metres	6.92	Flagstaff, AZ (USA)	08 FEB 2003
Long Jump	7.40	Indianapolis, IN (USA)	14 FEB 1998
