= Neil Gardner =

Jamaican athlete

Neil Gardner OLY
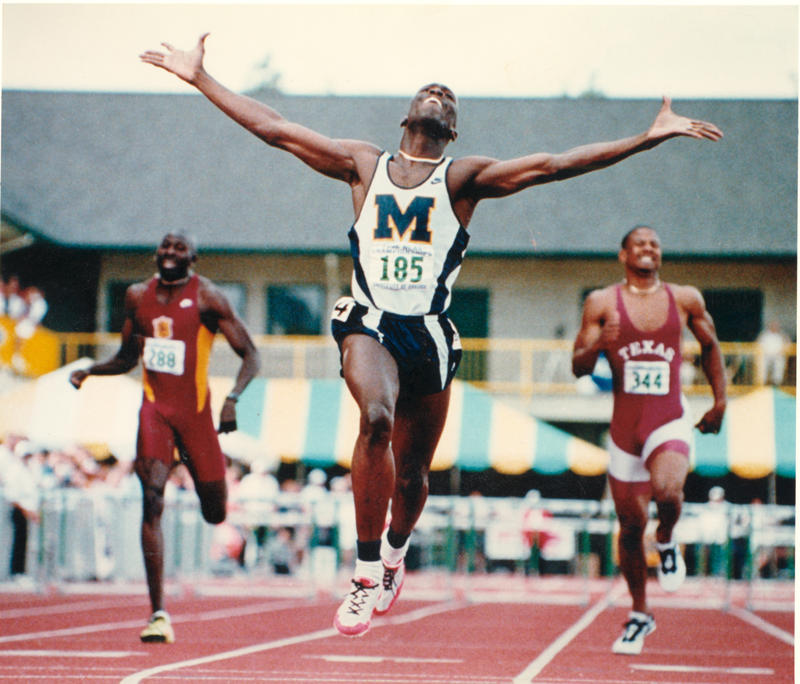
- Gardner winning the 1996 NCAA Championships - 400M Hurdles

Personal information
- Born: 8 December 1974 (age 51) Kingston, Jamaica
- Height: 5 ft 10 in (1.78 m)
- Weight: 155 lb (70 kg)

Sport
- Sport: Running
- Event: Sprinting (400 meter hurdles)
Medal record
Representing Jamaica
Men's Athletics
NCAA Championship
Gold medal – first place	1996 NCAA Outdoor Championship	400m hurdles
Gold medal – first place	1997 NCAA Indoor Championship	55m hurdles
CARIFTA Games(Under 20)
Gold medal – first place	1993 Fort-de-France	110m hurdles
Silver medal – second place	1993 Fort-de-France	High Jump
Silver medal – second place	1993 Fort-de-France	Triple Jump
Silver medal – second place	1992 Nassau	110m hurdles
Bronze medal – third place	1992 Nassau	High Jump
Bronze medal – third place	1991 Port of Spain	110m hurdles
Bronze medal – third place	1991 Port of Spain	Triple Jump
CARIFTA Games(Under 17)
Bronze medal – third place	1990 Kingston	High Jump
Bronze medal – third place	1989 Bridgetown	High Jump
Pan American Junior Championships
Bronze medal – third place	1993 Winnipeg, Canada	110m hurdles

Neil Anthony Gardner (born 8 December 1974) is a Jamaican former athlete who specialized in the 400 meters hurdles event. As a junior athlete (under 20 years of age) Gardner found much success at the Inter-Secondary School Sports Association National Boys' Championships where he was awarded the Victor Ludorum (Champion Athlete) three years in a row, 1991–1993. Gardner also excelled in the CARIFTA Games, winning several medals between 1989 and 1993.

In 1993, Gardner was awarded a track and field scholarship to the University of Michigan in Ann Arbor, Michigan to compete in the Jumps and Hurdles. While at Michigan, Gardner won three Big Ten titles and was runner-up on six occasions. In his junior year 1996, Gardner won the NCAA Outdoor Championship track and field 400 m hurdle championship title in a time of 49.27 seconds. In 1997, Gardner went on to become the first person in the history of the NCAA to win the NCAA championship titles in both the 400 m hurdle event (outdoors) as well as the 55 m hurdle event (indoors), which he did in a time of 7.18 seconds.

His personal best time of 48.30 in the 400 m hurdles at the Olympic game in 1996, ranked Gardner among the top 10 performers of all time for the NCAA as well as the Central American and Caribbean region. This time was also a varsity record for the University of Michigan. Gardner is ranked 6th among Jamaican 400 m hurdlers of all time.

== The Olympic Games and IAAF World Championships ==
Gardner represented Jamaica in the 1996 Olympic Games in Atlanta, Georgia where he was a semi-finalist in the 400m hurdle event. Gardner ran 48.59 seconds in the preliminaries and was the 6th fastest qualifier overall for the semifinals. Gardner ran 48.30 seconds in his semifinal heat, placing fifth in a four way photo finish, just missing the fourth place qualifying spot by 0.02 seconds. The second, third and fourth-place finishers each was credited with the same time of 48.28 seconds. Gardner's time would have placed him third in the other semi-final and would have guaranteed him a spot in the final. Had Gardner competed in any other Olympic Game, in any other year, his time would have not only qualified him for the finals, but would have won on many occasions.

In 2001, Gardner was a semi-finalist in the 400 meters hurdles at the 8th IAAF World Championships in Athletics in Edmonton, Canada again representing his native, Jamaica.

== Academic years and later career ==
Gardner received a full athletic scholarship to attend the University of Michigan in 1993. Gardner graduated from Michigan with a 3.24 GPA in Biochemistry in December 1997. Gardner then returned to Jamaica in January 1998 where he competed professionally in track and field until 2005. Gardner was the first recipient of a scholarship through the World Olympians Association and the World Federation of Chiropractic, to study chiropractic at Parker College of Chiropractic. Gardner graduated from Parker College in August 2009 with a 4.0 GPA, summa cum laude as the class valedictorian. He also received two Bachelor of Science degrees in Anatomy and Health & Wellness. Dr. Neil Gardner opened his chiropractic clinic, Gardner Chiropractic & Wellness Center, in December 2009 in Richardson, Texas. He recently moved back to Jamaica to open his clinic, Gardner Chiropractic & Neurology Ltd. in Kingston, Jamaica.

== Honors and awards ==
Gardner was inducted into the University of Michigan Men's Track & Field Hall of Fame in May 2007. In March 2010, Gardner was named High School Athlete of the Decade for the 1990s, by the Inter-Secondary School Sport Association, Kingston, Jamaica.

Dr. Neil Gardner is the 2011 recipient of the Courtney Walsh Award for Excellence.

== Accomplishments and Major Competition results ==
=== ISSA National Boy’s Championships Results ===
Year	Event	Results
1988	High Jump	2nd
1989	High Jump	1st
1990	High Jump	2nd
1991	High Jump	1st(record)
1991	Long Jump	1st(record)
1991	110m Hurdles	1st(record)
1991	4 × 100 m relay	1st
1992	High Jump	2nd
1992	110m Hurdles	1st
1992	Heptathlon	1st
1993	High Jump	2nd
1993	Long Jump	2nd
1993	110m Hurdles	2nd
1993	Triple Jump	1st
1993	4 × 100 m relay	2nd

=== CARIFTA Games results ===
Year	Venue	Event	Results	Time/Measurement
1989	Barbados	High Jump	3rd	
1990	Jamaica	High Jump	3rd	
1991	Trinidad	Triple Jump	3rd	14.97
1991	Trinidad	110m hurdles	3rd	14.73
1992	Bahamas	High Jump	3rd	2.05
1992	Bahamas	110m hurdles	2nd	15.04
1993	Martinique	High Jump	2nd	2.05
1993	Martinique	Triple Jump	2nd	15.62
1993	Martinique	110m hurdles	1st	15.04

=== Pan American Junior Championships results ===
Year	Venue	Event	Result	Time
1993	Winnipeg, Canada	110m hurdles	3rd	14.30

=== NCAA Championships ===
Year	Venue	Event	Result	Time
1996	Eugene, Oregon	400m hurdles	1st	49.27
1997	Indianapolis, Indiana	55m hurdles	1st	7.18

=== 26th Olympic Games ===
Year	City	Event	Phase	Unit	Rank	Time
1996	Atlanta	400m hurdles	Semi-finals	Heat 2	5th	48.30
1996	Atlanta	400m hurdles	Round One	Heat 7	4th	48.59

=== 8th IAAF World Championships ===
Year	City	Event	Phase	Unit	Rank	Time
2001	Edmonton	400m hurdles	Semi-finals	Heat 2	6th	49.57
2001	Edmonton	400m hurdles	Round One	Heat 4	1st	49.29

=== Other Major Competitions ===
Year	Venue	Event	Results
1997	Stockholm	400m hurdles	49.74
1998	Thessaloniki	400m hurdles	48.92
1999	Nassau	400m hurdles	50.68
2000	Nassau	400m hurdles	49.50
2001	Kingston	400m hurdles	48.71
2001	Monaco - Herculis	400m hurdles	3rd
2003	Luzern	400m hurdles	49.07
2003	Golden Spike	400m hurdles	5th
2003	Meeting de Madrid	400m hurdles	5th
2003	Portugal	400m hurdles	1st
2004	Oregon	400m hurdles	49.80
