= Chris Rawlinson =

British hurdler

Personal information
- Nationality: British (English)
- Born: 19 May 1972 (age 54) Rotherham, England
- Height: 183 cm (6 ft 0 in)
- Weight: 77 kg (170 lb)

Sport
- Sport: Athletics
- Events: 400 metres hurdles, 4 x 400 metres relay
- Club: Trafford AC
Medal record
Men's athletics
Representing Great Britain
IAAF World Cup
Bronze medal – third place	2002 Madrid	400 m hurdles
European Cup
Gold medal – first place	2000 Gateshead	400 m hurdles
Gold medal – first place	2003 Florence	400 m hurdles
Gold medal – first place	2004 Bydgoszcz	400 m hurdles
Silver medal – second place	2000 Gateshead	4x400 m relay
Silver medal – second place	2003 Florence	4x400 m relay
Bronze medal – third place	2002 Annecy	400 m hurdles
Universiade
Silver medal – second place	1999 Palma de Mallorca	4x400 m relay
Bronze medal – third place	1997 Catania	4x400 m relay
Representing England
Commonwealth Games
Gold medal – first place	2002 Manchester	400 m hurdles
Gold medal – first place	2002 Manchester	4x400 m relay

Christopher Lee Rawlinson (born 19 May 1972) is a former track and field athlete who competed in the 400 metre hurdles. He competed at the 2000 Summer Olympics and the 2004 Summer Olympics.

== Biography ==
A graduate of Loughborough University, Rawlinson competed in the pole vault, decathlon and 110 m hurdles in his early career, Rawlinson found the gruelling 400 m hurdles to be his best event.

Rawlinson won the first of his seven British titles after winning the British AAA Championships title at the 1998 AAA Championships. The others came from 1999 to 2004.

At both the 2000 Olympic Games in Sydney and the 2004 Olympic Games in Athens, he represented Great Britain in the 400 metres hurdles.

In July 2004 he ranked third on the United Kingdom all-time list for the 400 m hurdles with a time of 48.14 seconds, set in 1999 at Zürich, Switzerland. In the build-up to the 2004 Summer Olympics in Athens, Greece, Rawlinson was ranked number five in the world by the IAAF. Until 2020 Rawlinson held the world best of 34.48 seconds for the rarely run 300 m hurdles, which he set at Sheffield, England on 30 June 2002.

Rawlinson retired from competitive athletics at the end of 2005 at the age of 33.

He married Australian athlete Jana Pittman on 31 March 2006. and is now married to Catherine Clark, sports administrator, they have 2 sons.

== International competitions ==
Year	Competition	Venue	Position	Notes
1997	Universiade	Catania, Italy	3rd	4 x 400 m relay
1997	World Championships	Athens, Greece	5th (heats)	400 m hurdles
1999	Universiade	Palma de Mallorca, Spain	2nd	4 x 400 m relay
2000	European Cup	Gateshead, England	1st	400 m hurdles
2000	European Cup	Gateshead, England	2nd	4 x 400 m relay
2000	Olympic Games	Sydney, Australia	6th (semis)	400 m hurdles
2000	IAAF Grand Prix Final	Doha, Qatar	6th	400 m hurdles
2001	World Championships	Edmonton, Canada	5th	400 m hurdles
2002	European Cup	Annecy, France	3rd	400 m hurdles
2002	Commonwealth Games	Manchester, England	1st	400 m hurdles
2002	Commonwealth Games	Manchester, England	1st	4 x 400 m relay
2002	European Championships	Munich, Germany	2nd (semis)	400 m hurdles
2002	IAAF Grand Prix Final	Paris, France	8th	400 m hurdles
2002	IAAF World Cup	Madrid, Spain	3rd	400 m hurdles
2003	European Cup	Florence, Italy	1st	400 m hurdles
2003	European Cup	Florence, Italy	2nd	4 x 400 m relay
2003	World Championships	Paris, France	6th	400 m hurdles
2003	World Championships	Paris, France	4th	4 × 400 m relay
2003	IAAF World Athletics Final	Monte Carlo, Monaco	8th	400 m hurdles
2004	European Cup	Bydgoszcz, Poland	1st	400 m hurdles
2004	Olympic Games	Athens, Greece	8th (semis)	400 m hurdles
2004	IAAF World Athletics Final	Monte Carlo, Monaco	8th	400 m hurdles
2005	European Cup	Florence, Italy	6th	400 m hurdles
2006	Commonwealth Games	Melbourne, Australia	8th	400 m hurdles
