= Geraldine McQueen (athlete) =

Grenadian middle-distance runner

Personal information
- Born: St. George's, Grenada

Sport
- Country: Grenada
- Sport: Track and field
- Event(s): 1500 m 3000 m

Achievements and titles
- Personal best(s): 1500 m: 4:48.90; 3000 m:10:08.2
Medal record
Women's athletics
Representing Grenada
CARIFTA Games(U17)
Bronze medal – third place	1991 Port of Spain	1500 m
Bronze medal – third place	1992 Nassau	1500 m
CARIFTA Games(U20)
Bronze medal – third place	1991 Port of Spain	3000 m
Bronze medal – third place	1992 Nassau	3000 m
Bronze medal – third place	1993 Fort-de-France	1500 m
Bronze medal – third place	1993 Fort-de-France	3000 m

Geraldine McQueen (born 3 February 1976) is a retired Grenadian middle-distance runner. She set the Grenadian national record for the 3000 metres in 1991 at the CARIFTA Games. Geraldine later emigrated to the United States and attended and competed for Martin Luther King High School.

== Competition record ==
Year	Competition	Venue	Position	Event	Notes
Representing Grenada
1991	CARIFTA Games	Port of Spain, Trinidad and Tobago	3rd	3000 m (U20)	10:08.2
1991	CARIFTA Games	Port of Spain, Trinidad and Tobago	3rd	1500 m (U17)	4:50.13
1992	CARIFTA Games	Nassau, Bahamas	3rd	3000 m (U20)	10:43.21
1992	CARIFTA Games	Nassau, Bahamas	3rd	1500 m (U17)	4:51.65
1993	CARIFTA Games	Fort-de-France, Martinique	3rd	3000m (U20)	10:44.96
1993	CARIFTA Games	Fort-de-France, Martinique	3rd	1500m (U20)	4:48.90
