= Wayne Johnson (runner) =

American long-distance runner

Personal information
- Full name: Orda Wayne Johnson
- Nationality: American
- Born: September 15, 1902
- Died: October 1, 1982 (aged 80)

Sport
- Sport: Long-distance running
- Event: 10,000 metres

Orda Wayne Johnson (September 15, 1902 – October 1, 1982) was an American long-distance runner. He competed in the men's 10,000 metres at the 1924 Summer Olympics.
