= Theron Cooper =

Bahamian sprinter

Personal information
- Nationality: Bahamian
- Born: 18 January 1974 (age 52)

Sport
- Sport: Sprinting
- Event: 4 × 400 metres relay

Theron Cooper (born 18 January 1974) is a Bahamian sprinter. He competed in the men's 4 × 400 metres relay at the 1996 Summer Olympics.
