= Ian Weakley =

Ian Weakly
Personal information
- Born: February 24, 1974 (age 52) Montego Bay, Jamaica

Sport
- Country: Jamaica
- Sport: Track and Field
- Events: 400 meter hurdles; Relays
- Club: Nike
- Turned pro: 1998

Achievements and titles
- Personal best: 400 mH: 48.55 (2003) 400 m: 46.23 (1999) 500 m: 1:02.07 (2000) 800 m: 1:48.42 (1997) 1000 m: 2:25.78 (1997)
Medal record
Men's track and field
Representing Jamaica
CARIFTA Games (U20)
Gold medal – first place	1992 Nassau	400 m hurdles
Gold medal – first place	1993 Fort-de-France	400 m hurdles
National Championships
Bronze medal – third place	1997 Kingston	400 m hurdles
Bronze medal – third place	2000 Kingston	400 m hurdles
Gold medal – first place	2001 Kingston	400 m hurdles
Silver medal – second place	2002 Kingston	400 m hurdles
Commonwealth Games
Bronze medal – third place	2002 Manchester	400 m hurdles
IAAF Grand Prix
Silver medal – second place	2002 Doha	400 m hurdles
Bronze medal – third place	2003 Helsinki	400 m hurdles
Bronze medal – third place	2004 Osaka	400 m hurdles
Silver medal – second place	2005 Osaka	400 m hurdles
Gold medal – first place	2005 Doha	400 m hurdles
CAC Games
Silver medal – second place	2006 Cartagena de Indias	400 m hurdles
Penn Relays
Gold medal – first place	2002 Penn	4x400 m relay
Goodwill Games
Silver medal – second place	2001 Brisbane	4x400 m relay

Ian Weakly AKA Ian Weakley (born 24 February 1974 in Montego Bay, Saint James Parish) is a retired male hurdler from Jamaica. Weakly's best performance came in 2003 with a time of 48.55 in the 400 meter hurdles, ran in Trikala, Greece.

== Pre-Professional ==
Weakly began competing in athletics (Track and field) at St. Elizabeth Technical High School. Originally an 800m runner, Weakly transitioned to the 400 meter hurdles and began to succeed. Weakly won both the 1992 CARIFTA Games and 1993 CARIFTA Games in the 400 meter hurdles. After graduation Weakly attended Southwestern Christian College where he won both silver and bronze at the 1994 & 1995 NJCAA National Championships. Also during his time at Southwestern Christian College Weakly qualified for the 1994 Commonwealth Games final where he finished eighth. Weakly then transferred to George Mason University being a part of the 1995 Indoor National Championship winning team. During the following 1996 outdoor season Weakly would win silver and bronze in the 400 metres hurdles and the 4 × 400 metres relay at the NCAA Track and Field Championships as well as place fourth at the Jamaican Athletics Championships just missing out on the 1996 Atlanta Olympic Games. Weakly would then run his fastest 1000 metres and 800 metres within a week of each other in February 1997 clocking in at 2:25.78 and 1:48.42 respectively. Weakly would Graduate from George Mason in 1998 with a Bachelors in International Relations and Government & Politics. Later that year he would sign a professional contract with Nike.

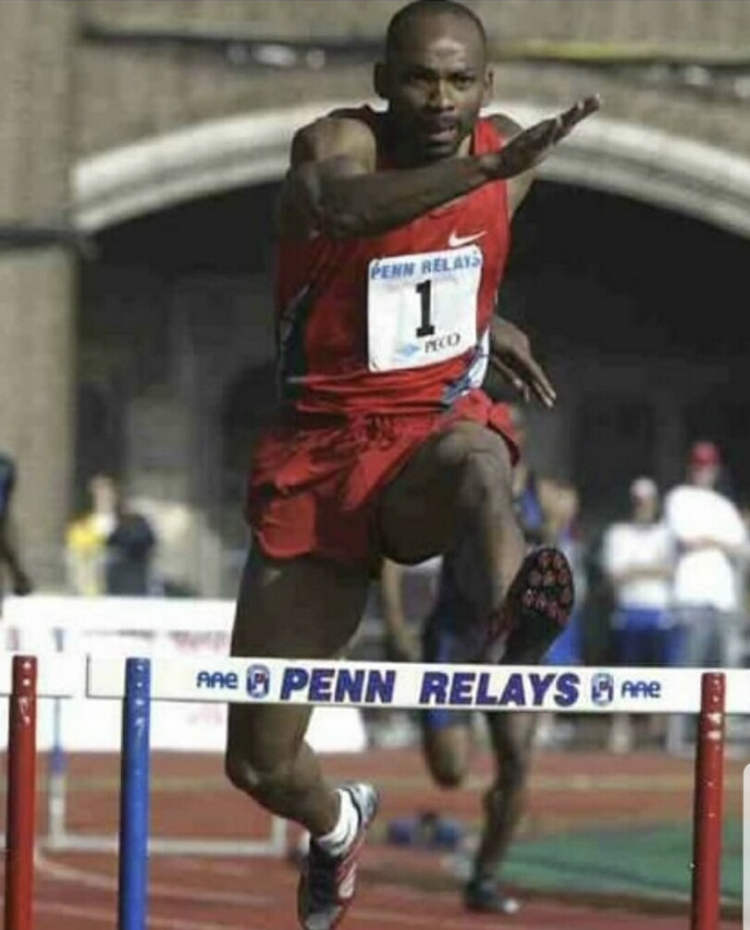

== Professional Athletics career ==
Weakly is best known for winning the gold medal in the 400m hurdles at the 2001 Jamaican Athletics Championships. After placing fourth in 1996, Weakly made it to the 2000 Summer Olympics where he reached the semi-finals. In 2002 Weakly would place third at the 2002 Commonwealth Games. Later that year he would place 5th at the IAAF World Cup. In 2003 he would run his lifetime best of 48.55 seconds, in Trikala. This time put Weakly as one of the fastest 150 runners all-time in his event. However, after an impressive 2003 season Weakly was unable to replicate this performance in 2004, where he fell in qualifying for the Olympics. The next year, Weakly recaptured his 2003 form by winning gold in the 2005 IAAF Super Grand Prix in Doha and placing second in the Golden Grand Prix in Osaka, Japan. He would make the 2005 World Athletics Final finishing eighth. Weakly would next win silver at the 2006 Central American and Caribbean Games. After placing 5th at the National Championships and not qualifying for the 2008 Beijing Olympics, Weakly would retire from professional running.
