= Štěpán Tesařík =

Czech athlete (born 1978)

Personal information
- Born: 6 July 1978 (age 48) Prague, Czechoslovakia

Sport
- Sport: Track and field
Medal record
Representing Czech Republic
European Indoor Championships
Gold medal – first place	2000 Ghent	4x400m relay

Štěpán Tesařík (born 6 July 1978) is a Czech athlete who specializes in the 400 metres hurdles.

He finished sixth at the 2002 European Championships. In 4 × 400 metres relay he won the gold medal at the 2000 European Indoor Championships and finished fourth at the 2002 European Championships.

His personal best 400 metres hurdles time is 49.09 seconds, achieved in August 2003 in Szombathely.

Štěpán Tesařík is a grandson of World War II hero Richard Tesařík.
