= Athletics at the 1994 Jeux de la Francophonie – Results =

These are the full results of the athletics competition at the 1994 Jeux de la Francophonie which took place on July 11–13, 1994, in Bondoufle, France.

== Men's results ==
=== 100 meters ===
Heats
Wind:
Heat 1: -0.8 m/s, Heat 2: +0.5 m/s, Heat 3: -0.9 m/s, Heat 4: +0.4 m/s, Heat 5: -1.2 m/s, Heat 6: -1.6 m/s

Rank	Heat	Name	Nationality	Time	Notes
1	1	Donovan Bailey	Canada	10.50	Q
2	1	Franck Waota	Ivory Coast	10.63	Q
3	1	Laurent Lecomte	France	10.70	q
4	1	Valentin Ngbobo	Central African Republic	10.71	
5	1	Barnabe Jolicoeur	Mauritius	10.93	
6	1	Amarildo Almeida	Guinea-Bissau	10.98	
7	1	Mohamed Camara	Senegal	10.99	
1	2	Bruny Surin	Quebec	10.15	Q, GR
2	2	Sheridon Baptiste	Canada	10.56	Q
3	2	Sébastien Carrat	France	10.61	q
4	2	David Nkoua	Congo	10.77	
5	2	Bruno Pothanah	Mauritius	10.88	
6	2	Ronald Promesse	Saint Lucia	10.88	
7	2	Jean Rudolph	Haiti	11.00	
1	3	Glenroy Gilbert	Canada	10.42	Q
2	3	Stéphane Cali	France	10.66	Q
3	3	Theodore Haba	Guinea	10.84	
4	3	Yan Lowe	Quebec	10.87	
5	3	Patrick Rachmann	Switzerland	11.09	
6	3	Eric Ebang	Gabon	11.11	
7	3	Marc Toussaint	Haiti	11.63	
8	3	Philippe Bejjani	Lebanon	11.64	
1	4	Jean Randriamamitiana	Madagascar	10.74	Q
2	4	Abdellah Boukraa	Morocco	10.75	Q
3	4	Hassane Illiassou	Niger	10.91	
4	4	Lindsey Joseph	Saint Lucia	11.08	
5	4	Wilson Crispen	Haiti	11.17	
	4	Brahim Mohamed Ould	Mauritania	DQ	
	4	Ntepe Issa	Cameroon	DQ	
	4	Atlee Mahorn	Quebec	DNS	
1	5	Oumar Loum	Senegal	10.58	Q
2	5	Ousman Diarra	Mali	10.62	Q
3	5	Claude Toukéné-Guébogo	Cameroon	10.74	
4	5	Edmund Estephane	Saint Lucia	10.80	
5	5	Calixte Aholu	Togo	10.88	
6	5	Pascal Dangbo	Benin	10.90	
7	5	Patrick Mocci-Raoumbe	Gabon	10.92	
8	5	Jack Laurance	Vanuatu	11.08	
1	6	Ibrahim Meité	Ivory Coast	10.50	Q
2	6	Franck Amégnigan	Togo	10.58	Q
3	6	Hyacinthe Kamelan	Ivory Coast	10.58	q
4	6	Benjamin Sirimou	Cameroon	??.??	q
5	6	Seydou Loum	Senegal	10.80	
6	6	Germain Ndzana	Cameroon	10.89	
7	6	Harouna Pale	Burkina Faso	??.??	
8	6	Sory Diakite	Mali	11.31	

Semifinals
Wind:
Heat 1: +0.7 m/s, Heat 2: -0.8 m/s

Rank	Heat	Name	Nationality	Time	Notes
1	1	Bruny Surin	Quebec	10.13	Q, GR
2	1	Donovan Bailey	Canada	10.28	Q
3	2	Glenroy Gilbert	Canada	10.42	Q
4	2	Ibrahim Meité	Ivory Coast	10.43	Q
5	1	Ousman Diarra	Mali	10.49	Q
6	1	Oumar Loum	Senegal	10.50	Q
7	1	Franck Amégnigan	Togo	10.55	
8	2	Franck Waota	Ivory Coast	10.59	Q
9	2	Sheridon Baptiste	Canada	10.60	Q
10	2	Benjamin Sirimou	Cameroon	10.63	
11	1	Laurent Lecomte	France	10.65	
12	2	Sébastien Carrat	France	10.72	
13	2	Stéphane Cali	France	10.72	
14	1	Abdellah Boukraa	Morocco	10.74	
15	2	Jean Randriamamitiana	Madagascar	10.97	
	1	Hyacinthe Kamelan	Ivory Coast	DQ	

Final
Wind: +0.5 m/s

Rank	Lane	Name	Nationality	Time	Notes
1st place, gold medalist(s)	4	Bruny Surin	Quebec	10.08	GR
2nd place, silver medalist(s)	5	Donovan Bailey	Canada	10.27	
3rd place, bronze medalist(s)	8	Oumar Loum	Senegal	10.35	
4	3	Ibrahim Meité	Ivory Coast	10.38	
5	6	Glenroy Gilbert	Canada	10.41	
6	1	Sheridon Baptiste	Canada	10.50	
7	2	Ousman Diarra	Mali	10.51	
8	7	Franck Waota	Ivory Coast	10.54	

=== 200 meters ===
Heats
Wind:
Heat 1: -0.4 m/s, Heat 2: -0.2 m/s, Heat 3: -0.7 m/s, Heat 4: -0.1 m/s, Heat 5: -1.9 m/s

Rank	Heat	Name	Nationality	Time	Notes
1	4	Ricardo Greenidge	Canada	21.04	Q
2	4	Thierry Lubin	France	21.13	Q
3	1	O'Brian Gibbons	Canada	21.14	Q
4	4	Seydou Loum	Senegal	21.21	q
5	1	Bruno Marie-Rose	France	21.23	Q
6	1	Atlee Mahorn	Quebec	21.33	q
7	2	Menelick Lawson	Togo	21.36	Q
7	3	Mohamed El Kandoussi	Morocco	21.36	Q
9	2	Mohamed Modamane	Morocco	21.41	Q
10	4	Pierre Makon	Cameroon	21.49	q
11	3	Martin Proulx	Quebec	21.51	Q
12	3	Dominique Méyépa	Mauritius	21.53	
13	2	Valentin Ngbogo	Central African Republic	21.58	
14	4	Brahim Abdoulaye	Chad	21.59	
15	5	Soulemane Badjy	Senegal	21.51	Q
16	4	Harouna Pale	Burkina Faso	21.76	
17	2	Ahmed Douhou	Ivory Coast	21.77	
18	5	Peter Ogilvie	Canada	21.81	Q
19	2	Edmund Estephane	Saint Lucia	21.84	
20	1	Barnabe Jolicoeur	Mauritius	21.88	
21	1	Pascal Dangbo	Benin	21.97	
22	5	Noureddine Ould Ménira	Mauritania	22.03	
23	1	David Nkoua	Congo	22.11	
24	1	Nicolas Alloke	Ivory Coast	22.14	
25	2	Claude Toukéné-Guébogo	Cameroon	22.20	
26	2	Stéphane Belfort	Haiti	22.21	
27	3	Ronald Promesse	Saint Lucia	22.24	
28	4	Maxime Charlemagne	Saint Lucia	22.44	
29	3	Gervais Kirolo	Central African Republic	22.76	
30	5	Sory Diakite	Guinea	22.81	
30	5	Ronald Saint-Surin	Haiti	22.82	
31	4	Glen Matchett	New Brunswick	23.30	
32	3	Zacharia Missaiki	Lebanon	23.35	
	3	Oumar Loum	Senegal	DNF	
	2	Victor Razafindrakoto	Madagascar	DNS	
	3	Armindo Carvalho	Cape Verde	DNS	
	5	Patrice Doucet	Quebec	DNS	
	5	Mohamed Modamane	Morocco	DNS	
	5	Ousman Diarra	Mali	DNS	

Semifinals
Wind:
Heat 1: -0.3 m/s, Heat 2: -1.8 m/s

Rank	Heat	Name	Nationality	Time	Notes
1	1	Hermann Lomba	France	20.78	Q
2	1	Atlee Mahorn	Quebec	20.99	Q
3	1	Mohamed El Kandoussi	Morocco	21.10	Q
4	1	Peter Ogilvie	Canada	21.13	Q
5	1	Bruno Marie-Rose	France	21.14	
6	2	O'Brian Gibbons	Canada	21.33	Q
7	2	Ricardo Greenidge	Canada	21.34	Q
8	1	Seydou Loum	Senegal	21.37	
9	2	Thierry Lubin	France	21.42	Q
10	1	Benjamin Sirimou	Cameroon	21.49	
11	2	Antoine Boussombo	Gabon	21.56	Q
12	1	Menelick Lawson	Togo	21.59	
13	2	Martin Proulx	Quebec	21.64	
14	2	Pierre Makon	Cameroon	21.68	
15	2	Mohamed Modamane	Morocco	21.70	
16	2	Soulemane Badjy	Senegal	21.71	

Final
Wind: -1.7 m/s

Rank	Lane	Name	Nationality	Time	Notes
1st place, gold medalist(s)	4	Hermann Lomba	France	20.90	
2nd place, silver medalist(s)	6	Ricardo Greenidge	Canada	21.16	
3rd place, bronze medalist(s)	7	Thierry Lubin	France	21.25	
4	1	Peter Ogilvie	Canada	21.29	
5	2	Mohamed El Kandoussi	Morocco	21.34	
6	3	O'Brian Gibbons	Canada	21.34	
7	8	Antoine Boussombo	Gabon	21.60	
	5	Atlee Mahorn	Quebec	DNF	

=== 400 meters ===
Heats

Rank	Heat	Name	Nationality	Time	Notes
1	4	Bouchaib Belkaid	Morocco	46.90	Q
2	5	Jacques Farraudière	France	47.07	Q
3	5	Désiré Pierre-Louis	Mauritius	47.11	Q
4	4	Hachim Ndiaye	Senegal	47.16	Q
5	3	Pierre-Marie Hilaire	France	47.25	Q
6	1	Marc Foucan	France	47.49	Q
7	1	Benyounés Lahlou	Morocco	47.71	Q
8	2	Byron Goodwin	Canada	47.82	Q
8	3	Anthony Wilson	Canada	47.82	Q
10	2	Casimir Akoto Kossi	Togo	47.97	Q
11	3	Patrice Doucet	Quebec	48.07	q
12	5	Serge Simasotchi	Switzerland	48.10	q
13	4	Médard Makanga	Congo	48.14	q
14	1	Charles Tayot	Gabon	48.19	q
15	3	Maxime Charlemagne	Saint Lucia	48.23	q
15	4	Cissé Yacouba	Ivory Coast	48.23	q
17	4	Jean-Claude Yekpe	Benin	48.26	
18	1	Martial Biguet	Central African Republic	48.40	
19	2	Ibrahim Ouédraogo	Burkina Faso	48.49	
20	5	Henri Peyou Ndi	Cameroon	48.59	
21	1	Steve O'Brien	Quebec	48.69	
22	2	Jean Baptist Firiam	Vanuatu	48.74	
23	2	Kim Smith	Saint Lucia	49.22	
24	5	Nizigama Didace	Burundi	49.27	
25	3	Harris Woniteau	Dominica	49.27	
26	4	Pascal Murengerantwari	Burundi	50.16	
27	1	Gillian Vigier	Saint Lucia	50.28	
27	1	Abdel Maks. Elhefne	Egypt	50.45	
28	2	Alain Ondo	Gabon	50.49	
29	3	Chérif Baba Aidara	Mauritania	50.52	
30	5	Daouda Comara	Ivory Coast	50.85	
31	1	Glen Matchett	New Brunswick	51.71	
32	4	Zacharia Missaiki	Lebanon	52.02	
33	3	Faissoil Ben Daoud	Comoros	52.84	
34	2	Armindo Carvalho	Cape Verde	54.60	

Semifinals

Rank	Heat	Name	Nationality	Time	Notes
1	1	Bouchaib Belkaid	Morocco	46.40	Q
2	2	Hachim Ndiaye	Senegal	46.57	Q
3	2	Désiré Pierre-Louis	Mauritius	46.63	Q
4	2	Pierre-Marie Hilaire	France	46.64	Q
5	1	Benyounés Lahlou	Morocco	46.75	Q
6	2	Jacques Farraudière	France	46.82	Q
7	1	Marc Foucan	France	46.87	Q
8	1	Byron Goodwin	Canada	46.89	Q
9	2	Casimir Akoto Kossi	Togo	47.79	
10	1	Anthony Wilson	Canada	47.81	
11	1	Cissé Yacouba	Ivory Coast	48.14	
12	2	Charles Tayot	Gabon	48.25	
13	1	Médard Makanga	Congo	48.34	
14	2	Patrice Doucet	Quebec	48.38	
15	2	Maxime Charlemagne	Saint Lucia	48.48	
16	1	Serge Simasotchi	Switzerland	55.76	

Final

Rank	Lane	Name	Nationality	Time	Notes
1st place, gold medalist(s)	2	Pierre-Marie Hilaire	France	46.16	
2nd place, silver medalist(s)	4	Hachim Ndiaye	Senegal	46.32	
3rd place, bronze medalist(s)	5	Désiré Pierre-Louis	Mauritius	46.50	
4	7	Byron Goodwin	Canada	46.57	
5	1	Jacques Farraudière	France	46.68	
6	8	Marc Foucan	France	46.69	
7	6	Bouchaib Belkaid	Morocco	46.77	
8	3	Benyounés Lahlou	Morocco	46.94	

=== 800 meters ===
Heats

Rank	Heat	Name	Nationality	Time	Notes
1	2	Charles Nkazampyampi	Burundi	1:48.80	Q
2	2	Adil Ben Youk	Morocco	1:49.38	Q
3	3	Mahjoub Haïda	Morocco	1:49.97	Q
4	3	Arthémon Hatungimana	Burundi	1:50.56	Q
5	3	Franck Matamba	Gabon	1:50.86	q
6	2	Clement Dario	Mauritius	1:51.37	
7	1	Ousmane Diarra	France	1:51.59	Q
8	1	William Best	New Brunswick	1:51.60	Q
9	2	Mohamadou Sani	Cameroon	1:52.00	
10	1	Said Aaboudou	Morocco	1:52.10	
11	1	Nizigama Didace	Burundi	1:52.25	
12	2	Yvan Perroud	Switzerland	1:52.40	
13	2	Cedric Harris	Dominica	1:53.27	
14	1	Zachari Maidjida	Central African Republic	1:53.40	
15	3	Malal Sy Savane	Guinea	1:53.47	
16	1	Michel Renaud	Quebec	1:53.61	
17	1	Shobia Longville	Saint Lucia	1:53.71	
18	3	Junior Harris	Dominica	1:53.76	
19	3	Mukudi Murenga	Zaire	1:55.20	q
20	1	Ibrahim Ouedraogo	Burkina Faso	1:55.32	
21	2	Saad Karam	Lebanon	1:57.55	
22	2	Jean Baptist Firiam	Vanuatu	1:59.86	
23	3	André Louis Correia	Guinea-Bissau	2:01.41	
	3	Babacar Niang	Senegal	DNF	
	1	Daniel Kahumba	Zaire	DNS	

Final

Rank	Name	Nationality	Time	Notes
1st place, gold medalist(s)	Mahjoub Haïda	Morocco	1:50.48	
2nd place, silver medalist(s)	Ousmane Diarra	France	1:50.79	
3rd place, bronze medalist(s)	William Best	New Brunswick	1:51.23	
4	Franck Matamba	Gabon	1:51.43	
5	Charles Nkazampyampi	Burundi	1:51.43	
6	Adil Ben Youk	Morocco	1:51.99	
	Arthémon Hatungimana	Burundi	DNS	
	Mukudi Murenga	Zaire	DNS	

=== 1500 meters ===
Heats

Rank	Heat	Name	Nationality	Time	Notes
1	1	Hicham El Guerrouj	Morocco	3:46.78	Q
2	1	Rachid El Basir	Morocco	3:46.89	Q
3	2	Azzedine Sadiki	Morocco	3:47.42	Q
4	1	Frédéric Collignon	Wallonia	3:47.58	Q
5	1	Stephen Agar	Dominica	3:48.21	q
6	2	Rudy Vlasselaer	Wallonia	3:48.59	Q
7	2	Abdelkader Chékhémani	France	3:48.85	Q
8	1	Alexis Sharangabo	Burundi	3:48.97	q
9	2	Dhahdi Anizi	Tunisia	3:49.71	q
10	1	Brice Samba	Congo	3:50.46	q
11	2	Gilbert Mvuyekure	Burundi	3:50.47	q
12	2	Ibrahim Ali Foulieh	Djibouti	3:50.95	q
13	1	Nestor Mougomo	Gabon	3:52.82	
14	1	Christopher Blackburn	Mauritius	3:57.07	
15	1	Ali Khazaal	Lebanon	4:00.97	
16	2	Keruan Tawai	Vanuatu	4:01.07	
17	2	Manuel Moreno	Cape Verde	4:04.60	
18	2	Cedric Harris	Dominica	4:10.37	
19	1	Ahmed Ikibala	Comoros	4:33.67	
	1	Pierre Leveille	Quebec	DNF	
	2	Mohamadou Sani	Cameroon	DNF	
	2	Cheikh Tidiane Boye	Senegal	DNS	

Final

Rank	Name	Nationality	Time	Notes
1st place, gold medalist(s)	Azzedine Sadiki	Morocco	3:42.57	
2nd place, silver medalist(s)	Abdelkader Chékhémani	France	3:43.08	
3rd place, bronze medalist(s)	Hicham El Guerrouj	Morocco	3:43.54	
4	Rachid El Basir	Morocco	3:43.88	
5	Frédéric Collignon	Wallonia	3:46.18	
6	Rudy Vlasselaer	Wallonia	3:47.95	
7	Dhahdi Anizi	Tunisia	3:47.97	
8	Gilbert Mvuyekure	Burundi	3:48.34	
	Stephen Agar	Dominica	DNF	
	Brice Samba	Congo	DNF	
	Alexis Sharangabo	Burundi	DNF	
	Ibrahim Ali Foulieh	Djibouti	DNS	

=== 5000 meters ===
Rank	Name	Nationality	Time	Notes
1st place, gold medalist(s)	Salah Hissou	Morocco	13:22.08	GR
2nd place, silver medalist(s)	Brahim Lahlafi	Morocco	13:25.91	
3rd place, bronze medalist(s)	Brahim Jabbour	Morocco	14:01.64	
4	Atiq Naaji	France	14:04.07	
5	Hamadi Chabbouh	Tunisia	14:05.00	
6	Leopold Sirabahenda	Burundi	14:09.43	
7	Mokhtar Hizaoui	Tunisia	14:10.87	
8	Chris Weber	Canada	14:14.00	
9	Jean-Paul Gahimbaré	Burundi	14:28.08	
10	Mike Félicité	Mauritius	14:36.80	
11	Omar Daher Gadid	Djibouti	14:40.61	
12	Jacky Carlier	France	14:47.16	
13	Ernest Ndjissipou	Central African Republic	14:49.08	
14	Janick Lambert	Quebec	14:54.51	
15	Manuel Moreno	Cape Verde	15:08.39	
16	Ali Awad	Lebanon	15:13.78	
17	Pierre Foka	Cameroon	15:13.96	
18	Kouadio Kra	Ivory Coast	16:15.75	
19	Paul Tarraf	Lebanon	16:17.54	
	Ismael Hassan	Djibouti	DNF	
	Stephen Agar	Dominica	DNF	
	Hilaire Ntirampéba	Burundi	DNS	
	Rorri Currie	New Brunswick	DNS	
	Keruan Tawai	Vanuatu	DNS	

=== 10,000 meters ===
Rank	Name	Nationality	Time	Notes
1st place, gold medalist(s)	Salah Hissou	Morocco	28:34.25	GR
2nd place, silver medalist(s)	Hammou Boutayeb	Morocco	28:35.88	
3rd place, bronze medalist(s)	Khalid Boulami	Morocco	28:48.43	
4	Yayer Aden	Djibouti	29:18.18	
5	Bernard Mvuyekure	Burundi	29:28.92	
6	Mokhtar Hizaoui	Tunisia	29:37.29	
7	Leopold Sirabahenda	Burundi	30:01.81	
8	Fraser Bertram	Quebec	30:24.95	
9	Souley Oumarou	Niger	30:31.03	
10	Jean-Paul Gahimbaré	Burundi	30:39.03	
11	Abdillah Soilih	Comoros	32:39.13	
12	Ali Awad	Lebanon	35:17.18	
13	Sok Sao	Cambodia	38:49.30	
	A. da Silva Dias	Guinea-Bissau	DNF	

=== Marathon ===
Rank	Name	Nationality	Time	Notes
1st place, gold medalist(s)	Tahar Mansouri	Tunisia	2:17:18	GR
2nd place, silver medalist(s)	Abdelkader Mouaziz	Morocco	2:21:29	
3rd place, bronze medalist(s)	Talal Omar Abdillahi	Djibouti	2:25:27	
4	Omar Moussa	Djibouti	2:28:23	
5	Zoltan Koszegi	France	2:31:28	
6	Woenan Touré	Ivory Coast	2:38:39	
7	Bassirima Soro	Ivory Coast	2:41:38	
8	Abderrahim Ben Redouane	Morocco	2:41:47	
9	Kevin Titus	Canada	2:44:08	
10	Noël Gallant	New Brunswick	2:49:03	
11	Victor Razafindrakoto	Madagascar	2:53:08	
12	Andrew Tafanda	Cameroon	2:53:25	
13	To Rithya	Cambodia	3:09:04	
	Hussein Ahmed Salah	Djibouti	DNF	
	Jean Lagarde	Quebec	DNF	
	Mimoun Lemhajjar	Morocco	DNS	
	Hamid Zouhair	France	DNS	

=== 110 meters hurdles ===
Heats
Wind:
Heat 1: -0.5 m/s, Heat 2: +0.2 m/s, Heat 3: +0.2 m/s

Rank	Heat	Name	Nationality	Time	Notes
1	3	Jonathan Nsenga	Wallonia	13.59	Q, GR
2	3	Vincent Clarico	France	13.62	Q
3	2	Tim Kroeker	Canada	13.74	Q
4	1	Dan Philibert	France	13.81	Q
5	2	Mathieu Jouys	France	14.05	Q
6	2	Marcelin Dally	Ivory Coast	14.19	q
7	3	Abdoulaye Sene	Senegal	14.20	q
8	1	Mohamed Sami Mohamed	Egypt	14.25	Q
9	1	Raphaël Monachon	Switzerland	14.38	
10	2	Khazine Zouhair	Morocco	14.39	
11	2	Mohamed Saad Abdelaziz	Egypt	14.53	
12	1	Michel Brodeur	Quebec	14.55	
13	1	Mamy Rakotoarisoa	Madagascar	14.62	
14	3	John Etienne	Quebec	14.84	
15	3	William Gamatis	Seychelles	14.87	
16	2	Jacques Brunet	Central African Republic	14.91	
17	2	Michel Jenest-Lahaye	Quebec	14.93	
18	1	Jean-Pierre Abossolo-Ze	Cameroon	15.61	
	1	Moustapha Sdad	Morocco	DQ	
	3	Judex Lefou	Mauritius	DNS	

Final
Wind:
-1.1 m/s

Rank	Lane	Name	Nationality	Time	Notes
1st place, gold medalist(s)	5	Dan Philibert	France	13.55	GR
2nd place, silver medalist(s)	3	Jonathan Nsenga	Wallonia	13.56	
3rd place, bronze medalist(s)	4	Tim Kroeker	Canada	13.68	
4	6	Vincent Clarico	France	13.84	
5	1	Mathieu Jouys	France	13.91	
6	7	Mohamed Sami Mohamed	Egypt	14.25	
7	2	Abdoulaye Sene	Senegal	14.35	
8	8	Marcelin Dally	Ivory Coast	14.49	

=== 400 meters hurdles ===
Heats

Rank	Heat	Name	Nationality	Time	Notes
1	2	Marc Dollendorf	Wallonia	50.47	Q
2	1	Fadhel Khayati	Tunisia	50.57	Q
3	1	Mohamed Debbab	Morocco	50.66	Q
4	3	Hubert Rakotombelontsoa	Madagascar	50.80	Q
5	3	Abdelhak Lahlali	Morocco	50.81	Q
6	2	Judex Lefou	Mauritius	50.83	Q
7	1	Ibou Faye	Senegal	50.91	q
8	2	Abdel Maks. Elhefne	Egypt	50.92	q
9	2	Sylvain Moreau	France	50.92	
10	3	Amadou M'Baye	Senegal	50.97	
11	1	Franck Grondin	France	51.01	
11	3	Gilbert Hashan	Mauritius	51.01	
13	1	Tom Zverina	Canada	51.65	
14	2	Michel Jenest-Lahaye	Quebec	51.83	
15	2	Amadou Sy Savané	Guinea	52.20	
16	1	Franck Asselman	Wallonia	52.50	
17	2	Monte Raymond	Canada	54.09	
18	3	Jean-François Zbinden	Switzerland	54.80	
19	3	Jean-Pierre Abossolo-Ze	Cameroon	55.02	
20	3	Colin Inglis	New Brunswick	55.42	
21	1	John Étienne	Quebec	55.55	
	3	Laurent Birade	Quebec	DNF	

Final

Rank	Lane	Name	Nationality	Time	Notes
1st place, gold medalist(s)	3	Fadhel Khayati	Tunisia	49.52	
2nd place, silver medalist(s)	4	Marc Dollendorf	Wallonia	50.03	
3rd place, bronze medalist(s)	2	Ibou Faye	Senegal	50.25	
4	6	Mohamed Debbab	Morocco	50.60	
5	5	Hubert Rakotombelontsoa	Madagascar	50.67	
6	8	Judex Lefou	Mauritius	51.12	
7	1	Abdel Maks. Elhefne	Egypt	51.21	
8	7	Abdelhak Lahlali	Morocco	1:04.93	

=== 4 × 100 meters relay ===
Heats

Rank	Heat	Nation	Competitors	Time	Notes
1	2	Ivory Coast	Hyacinthe Kamelan, Olivier Zirignon, Franck Waota, Ibrahim Meite	39.44	Q
2	1	Canada	Sheridon Baptiste, Glenroy Gilbert, Peter Ogilvie, Mike Viers	39.84	Q
3	1	Togo	Calixte Aholu, Casimir Akoto Kossi, Menelick Lawson, Franck Amégnigan	39.95	Q
4	1	Gabon	Patrick Mocci-Raoumbe, Antoine Boussombo, Charles Tayot, Eric Ebang Zué	40.14	Q
5	1	Senegal	Mohamed Camara, Soulemane Badjy, Babacar Sall, Cheikh Touré	40.14	q
6	1	France	Laroche Olivier, Sébastien Carrat, Laurent Lecomte, Stéphane Cali	40.27	q
7	1	Quebec	Michel Jenest-Lahaye, Martin Proulx, Patrice Doucet, Yan Lowe	40.65	
8	1	Morocco	Abdellah Boukraa, Khazine Zouhair, Mohamed Kandoussi, Moustapha Sdad	40.71	
9	2	Cameroon	Germain Ndzana, Benjamin Sirimou, Pierre Makon, Claude Toukéné-Guébogo	40.74	Q
10	2	Mauritius	Bruno Pothanah, Dominique Méyépa, Barnabe Jolicoeur, Vissen Mooneegan	41.70	Q
11	2	Saint Lucia	Lindsey Joseph, Ronald Promesse, Maxime Charlemagne, Edmund Estephane	40.80	
12	2	Congo	Michael Dzong, Paul Marie Ntsatou, David Nkoua, ?	41.74	
13	2	Haiti	Jean Rudolph, Ronald Saint-Surin, Wilson Crispen, Stéphane Belfort	41.81	
	1	Madagascar		DNS	
	2	Central African Republic		DNS	

Final

Rank	Lane	Nation	Competitors	Time	Notes
1st place, gold medalist(s)	5	Canada	Sheridon Baptiste, Glenroy Gilbert, Peter Ogilvie, Donovan Bailey	39.16	
2nd place, silver medalist(s)	4	Ivory Coast	Ouattara Lagazane, Olivier Zirignon, Franck Waota, Ibrahim Meite	39.38	
3rd place, bronze medalist(s)	7	France	Laroche Olivier, Sébastien Carrat, Hermann Lomba, Thierry Lubin	39.87	
4	3	Togo	Calixte Aholu, Casimir Akoto Kossi, Menelick Lawson, Franck Amégnigan	40.14	
5	8	Gabon	Patrick Mocci-Raoumbe, Antoine Boussombo, Charles Tayot, Eric Ebang Zué	40.36	
6	2	Senegal	Mohamed Camara, Guy Mialou, Seydou Loum, Cheikh Touré	40.69	
7	6	Cameroon	Germain Ndzana, Benjamin Sirimou, Pierre Makon, Claude Toukéné-Guébogo	40.73	
8	1	Mauritius	Bruno Pothanah, Dominique Méyépa, Barnabe Jolicoeur, Vissen Mooneegan	41.23	

=== 4 × 400 meters relay ===
Rank	Nation	Competitors	Time	Notes
1st place, gold medalist(s)	Senegal	Ibrahima Wade, Moustapha Diarra, Aboubakry Dia, Hachim Ndiaye	3:05.73	GR
2nd place, silver medalist(s)	Morocco	Mohamed Debbab, Brahim Lahlafi, Bouchaib Belkaid, Benyounès Lahlou	3:06.67	
3rd place, bronze medalist(s)	Canada	Antony Wilson, Kelly Crerar, Ahlosen Isaac, Byron Goodwin	3:07.71	
4	Mauritius	Dario Clement, Gilbert Hashan, Judex Lefou, Désiré Pierre-Louis	3:09.88	
5	Saint Lucia	Richard Spooner, Kim Smith, Shobia Longville, Maxime Charlemagne	3:11.68	
6	Quebec	Steve O'Brien, Michel Jenest-Lahaye, Patrice Doucet, John Étienne	3:11.69	
7	Central African Republic	Martial Biguet, Eric Touane, Zacharia Maidjida, Valentin Ngbogo	3:11.91	

=== 20 kilometers walk ===
Rank	Name	Nationality	Time	Notes
1st place, gold medalist(s)	Jean-Olivier Brosseau	France	1:25:48	GR
2nd place, silver medalist(s)	Martial Fesselier	France	1:26:52	
3rd place, bronze medalist(s)	Martin St. Pierre	Quebec	1:27:07	
4	Hatem Ghoula	Tunisia	1:28:57	
5	Benjamin Leroy	Wallonia	1:38:15	
6	Jerome Genet	Switzerland	1:41:41	
	Tim Berrett	Canada	DNF	

=== High jump ===
Rank	Name	Nationality	Result	Notes
1st place, gold medalist(s)	Cory Siermachesky	Canada	2.20	
2nd place, silver medalist(s)	Richard Duncan	Canada	2.20	
3rd place, bronze medalist(s)	Pierre Bernhard	France	2.18	
4	Charles Lefrançois	Quebec	2.18	
5	Khemraj Naiko	Mauritius	2.16	
6	Joel Vincent	France	2.13	
7	Hervé Ndi Ndi	France	2.13	
8	Jean-Claude Silao	Congo	2.10	
9	Patrick Renaud	Quebec	2.10	
10	Philippe Chassot	Switzerland	2.10	
11	Marcus George	Saint Lucia	2.07	
12	Eugene Ernesta	Seychelles	2.00	
13	Jason Thomas	New Brunswick	2.00	

=== Pole vault ===
Rank	Name	Nationality	Result	Notes
1st place, gold medalist(s)	Gérald Baudouin	France	5.60	
2nd place, silver medalist(s)	Jean-Marc Tailhardat	France	5.50	
3rd place, bronze medalist(s)	Alain Andji	France	5.30	
4	Curtis Heywood	Canada	5.30	
5	Paul Just	Canada	5.20	
6	Bernard Felten	Luxembourg	4.90	
7	Philippe Normandin	Quebec	4.50	
	Taoufik Lachheb	Morocco	DNS	
	Khalid Lachheb	Morocco	DNS	

=== Long jump ===
Rank	Name	Nationality	Result	Notes
1st place, gold medalist(s)	Cheikh Tidia Toure	Senegal	8.06w	GR
2nd place, silver medalist(s)	Jérôme Romain	Dominica	7.81	
3rd place, bronze medalist(s)	Franck Zio	Burkina Faso	7.75	
4	Guy Mialou	Senegal	7.73	
5	Brian Thomas	Canada	7.72	
6	Philippe Lami	France	7.71	
7	Daniel Beauchamp	Seychelles	7.54	
8	Toussaint Rabenala	Madagascar	7.37	
9	Yan Lowe	Quebec	7.36	
10	Felix Wembanyama Okongo	Zaire	7.08	
11	Franck Monnel	France	6.96	
12	Eric Touane	Central African Republic	6.52	
	Roger Gouloubi	Congo	DNS	
	Serge Hélan	France	DNS	
	Vissen Mooneegan	Mauritius	DNS	

=== Triple jump ===
Rank	Name	Nationality	Result	Notes
1st place, gold medalist(s)	Edrick Floréal	Quebec	16.83	
2nd place, silver medalist(s)	Alex Norca	France	16.72	
3rd place, bronze medalist(s)	Garfield Anselm	France	16.58	
4	Paul Nioze	Seychelles	16.41	
5	Mohamed Karim Sassi	Tunisia	16.34	
6	Vissen Mooneegan	Mauritius	16.07	
7	Kedjeloba Mambo	Wallonia	16.01	
8	Papa Ladji Konaté	Senegal	15.89	
9	Djeke Mambo	Zaire	15.20	
10	Germain Martial	France	15.01	
	Roger Gouloubi	Congo	NM	
	Jérôme Romain	Dominica	DNS	

=== Shot put ===
Rank	Name	Nationality	Result	Notes
1st place, gold medalist(s)	Gheorghe Gușet	Romania	19.67	GR
2nd place, silver medalist(s)	Scott Cappos	Canada	17.07	
3rd place, bronze medalist(s)	Rocky Vaitanacki	France	16.83	
4	Jean-Louis Lebon	France	16.49	
5	Martin Mélagne	Ivory Coast	15.42	
6	André Couture	Quebec	14.85	
7	Travis Washbrun	New Brunswick	14.79	
8	Athanase Oloko Nikoyo	Cameroon	13.98	
9	Curtley Bynoe	Dominica	13.74	
10	Rony Labban	Lebanon	12.72	

=== Discus throw ===
Rank	Name	Nationality	Result	Notes
1st place, gold medalist(s)	Costel Grasu	Romania	61.24	GR
2nd place, silver medalist(s)	Mickaël Conjungo	Central African Republic	60.40	
3rd place, bronze medalist(s)	Marcel Tarle	Romania	58.32	
4	Thierry Épalle	France	55.16	
5	Alex Stanat	Canada	52.24	
6	Richard Misterowicz	Canada	50.08	
7	André Couture	Quebec	49.82	
8	Patrick Buchs	Switzerland	48.54	
9	Mogy Camara	Mali	48.54	
10	Pierre Ndongo	Cameroon	46.10	
11	Athanase Oloko Nikoyo	Cameroon	45.28	
12	Curtley Bynoe	Dominica	40.38	
13	Simon Arakelian	Lebanon	33.10	
14	Karim Behlock	Lebanon	32.28	

=== Hammer throw ===
Rank	Name	Nationality	Result	Notes
1st place, gold medalist(s)	Gilles Dupray	France	74.94	GR
2nd place, silver medalist(s)	Frédéric Kuhn	France	72.20	
3rd place, bronze medalist(s)	Walter Ciofani	France	71.72	
4	Alex Malachenko	Wallonia	65.46	
5	Boris Stoikos	Canada	65.04	
6	James Fahie	Canada	64.52	
7	Christophe Kolb	Switzerland	59.42	
8	Charly de Ridder	Luxembourg	58.64	
9	Pierre Florens	Mauritius	52.10	

=== Javelin throw ===
Rank	Name	Nationality	Result	Notes
1st place, gold medalist(s)	Gregory Wiesner	Switzerland	75.12	GR
2nd place, silver medalist(s)	Maher Ridane	Tunisia	70.72	
3rd place, bronze medalist(s)	Charlus Bertimon	France	70.66	
4	Louis Brault	Quebec	70.12	
5	Larry Steinke	Canada	68.08	
6	Fodé Sidibé	Guinea	50.28	
7	Cyriaque Ayard	Central African Republic	47.42	
8	Athanase Oloko Nikoyo	Cameroon	46.56	

=== Decathlon ===
The highest mark recorded in each event is highlighted in yellow

Rank	Athlete	Nationality	100m	LJ	SP	HJ	400m	110m H	DT	PV	JT	1500m	Points	Notes
1st place, gold medalist(s)	Christian Mandrou	France	11.15	6.96	12.70	1.89	48.89	14.61	40.68	4.60	62.80	4:26.94	7766	
2nd place, silver medalist(s)	Cédric Lopez	France	11.05	7.15	13.00	1.98	48.70	14.84	40.38	4.30	61.86	4:41.36	7709	
3rd place, bronze medalist(s)	Jamel Bourmadad	France	11.17	7.50	11.58	1.98	48.94	14.69	35.70	4.60	44.64	4:25.76	7526	
4	Riahi Aniss	Tunisia	10.92	7.14	10.60	1.83	48.22	15.25	36.62	4.00	57.54	4:33.20	7257	
5	François Vallat	Switzerland	11.76	6.52	14.96	1.80	52.43	15.65	44.88	4.20	62.52	4:42.39	7172	
6	Frédéric Hebert	Quebec	11.19	6.87	11.76	1.86	49.90	15.48	36.00	3.70	53.88	4:30.23	6992	
7	Andrew Grady	Canada	11.58	6.30	11.96	1.77	51.12	15.81	33.60	3.80	42.64	4:47.34	6325	
	Richard Hesketh	Canada	11.46	6.67	13.29	1.89	50.23	DNF	DNS	–	–	–	DNF	

== Women's results ==
=== 100 meters ===
Heats
Wind:
Heat 1: -0.3 m/s, Heat 2: -0.9 m/s, Heat 3: +1.2 m/s, Heat 4: -0.6 m/s

Rank	Heat	Name	Nationality	Time	Notes
1	3	Patricia Girard	France	11.33	Q
2	1	Odiah Sidibé	France	11.56	Q
3	1	Lalao Ravaonirina	Madagascar	11.58	Q
4	3	N'Deye Binta Dia	Senegal	11.66	Q
5	2	Hanitriniaina Rakotondrabe	Madagascar	11.68	Q
6	4	Violetta Lapierre	France	11.82	Q
7	1	Hermin Joseph	Dominica	11.85	Q
8	3	Latifa Lahcen	Morocco	11.88	Q
9	2	Jane Thondojee	Mauritius	11.90	Q
9	3	Patricia Foufoué Ziga	Ivory Coast	11.90	Q
11	1	Dionne Wright	Canada	11.93	q
12	4	France Gareau	Canada	11.97	Q
13	2	Sonia Paquette	Quebec	12.05	Q
14	2	Tarama Perry	Canada	12.07	q
15	4	Georgette Nkoma	Cameroon	12.08	Q
16	3	Monique Kengné	Cameroon	12.07	q
17	4	Michelle Apkaline	Ivory Coast	12.21	
18	1	Sylvie Mballa Éloundou	Cameroon	12.28	
19	1	Sandra Glazer	Quebec	12.34	
20	4	Caroline Vachon	Quebec	12.38	
21	3	Monica Rahanitrinirina	Madagascar	12.41	
22	3	Oumou Sow	Guinea	12.48	
23	4	Cathy Lenoir	Wallonia	12.57	
24	3	Brianie Massaka-Youlou	Congo	12.59	
25	4	Aminata Konaté	Guinea	12.71	
26	2	Louanna Mooney	New Brunswick	12.89	
27	2	Lucie Pierre-Louis	Haiti	13.26	
28	4	Nairy Hairabedian	Lebanon	13.55	
	2	Mokosi Mpoka	Zaire	DNS	

Semifinals
Wind:
Heat 1: +1.1 m/s, Heat 2: +2.0 m/s

Rank	Heat	Name	Nationality	Time	Notes
1	1	Patricia Girard	France	11.11	Q, GR
2	2	Odiah Sidibé	France	11.37	Q
3	1	Lalao Ravaonirina	Madagascar	11.38	Q
4	2	N'Deye Binta Dia	Senegal	11.48	Q
5	1	Hermin Joseph	Dominica	11.50	Q
6	2	Hanitriniaina Rakotondrabe	Madagascar	11.57	Q
7	1	Violetta Lapierre	France	11.61	Q
7	2	Dionne Wright	Canada	11.61	Q
9	2	Patricia Foufoué Ziga	Ivory Coast	11.73	
10	1	France Gareau	Canada	11.76	
11	2	Latifa Lahcen	Morocco	11.82	
12	2	Tarama Perry	Canada	11.83	
13	1	Georgette Nkoma	Cameroon	11.85	
14	1	Jane Thondojee	Mauritius	11.90	
15	2	Sonia Paquette	Quebec	12.07	
16	1	Monique Kengné	Cameroon	12.08	

Final
Wind: +1.5 m/s

Rank	Lane	Name	Nationality	Time	Notes
1st place, gold medalist(s)	6	Patricia Girard	France	11.46	
2nd place, silver medalist(s)	3	Odiah Sidibé	France	11.59	
3rd place, bronze medalist(s)	4	Lalao Ravaonirina	Madagascar	11.67	
4	5	N'Deye Binta Dia	Senegal	11.83	
5	8	Hanitriniaina Rakotondrabe	Madagascar	11.85	
6	7	Hermin Joseph	Dominica	11.87	
7	1	Dionne Wright	Canada	11.92	
8	2	Violetta Lapierre	France	12.07	

=== 200 meters ===
Heats
Wind:
Heat 1: +0.3 m/s, Heat 2: -0.3 m/s, Heat 3: -0.6 m/s, Heat 4: -0.4 m/s

Rank	Heat	Name	Nationality	Time	Notes
1	1	Stacy Bowen	Canada	23.21	Q
2	1	Fabienne Ficher	France	23.26	q
3	2	Murielle Gallardo	France	23.48	Q
4	3	Delphine Combe	France	23.62	Q
5	2	France Gareau	Canada	23.75	q
6	1	Denise Ouabangui	Central African Republic	24.14	q
7	4	Hermin Joseph	Dominica	24.24	Q
8	1	Meskine Saad	Egypt	24.34	q
9	2	Latifa Lahcen	Morocco	24.34	
10	4	Jane Thondojee	Mauritius	24.39	
11	3	Nicole Commissiong	Quebec	24.65	
12	4	Monique Kengné	Cameroon	25.07	
13	2	Sylvie Mballa Éloundou	Cameroon	25.14	
13	4	Mamaissata Cisse	Guinea	25.14	
15	4	Sandra Glazer	Quebec	25.18	
16	1	Vernetta Lesforis	Saint Lucia	25.39	
17	1	Oumou Sow	Guinea	25.51	
18	1	Brianie Massaka-Youlou	Congo	25.52	
19	2	Katia Ancelin	Quebec	25.98	
20	3	Lucie Pierre-Louis	Haiti	26.30	
21	2	Brigitte Cormier	New Brunswick	26.40	
	3	Georgette Nkoma	Cameroon	DQ	
	2	Louise Ayétotché	Ivory Coast	DNS	
	3	Lalao Robine Ravaoniriana	Madagascar	DNS	
	3	Cathy Lenoir	Wallonia	DNS	
	3	Corinne Simasotchi	Switzerland	DNS	
	4	Hanitriniaina Rakotondrabe	Madagascar	DNS	

Final
Wind:
-0.6 m/s

Rank	Lane	Name	Nationality	Time	Notes
1st place, gold medalist(s)	3	Stacy Bowen	Canada	23.19	
2nd place, silver medalist(s)	4	Delphine Combe	France	23.35	
3rd place, bronze medalist(s)	2	Fabienne Ficher	France	23.60	
4	5	Murielle Gallardo	France	23.61	
5	1	France Gareau	Canada	23.91	
6	6	Hermin Joseph	Dominica	23.99	
7	7	Denise Ouabangui	Central African Republic	24.45	
8	8	Meskine Saad	Egypt	24.58	

=== 400 meters ===
Heats

Rank	Heat	Name	Nationality	Time	Notes
1	2	Evelyne Elien	France	52.59	Q
2	1	Alimata Koné	Ivory Coast	53.77	Q
3	3	Marie Line Scholent	France	53.96	Q
4	2	Louise Ayétotché	Ivory Coast	54.56	Q
5	1	Andrea Pinnock	Canada	54.62	Q
6	2	Michele Lynch	Canada	54.66	q
7	2	Mary-Estelle Kapalu	Vanuatu	54.73	q
8	3	Judith Fraser	Canada	54.75	Q
9	1	Meskine Saad	Egypt	55.20	
10	2	Denise Ouabangui	Central African Republic	55.28	
11	3	Nicole Commissiong	Quebec	55.52	
12	2	Aurélie Jonary	Madagascar	55.66	
13	3	Manda Kanouté	Mali	56.29	
14	1	Ony Ratsimbazary	Madagascar	56.40	
15	3	Véronique Kouamé	Ivory Coast	57.44	
16	2	Mamaissata Cisse	Guinea	57.60	
17	1	Agnes Khafaja	Lebanon	1:04.13	
17	1	Haoulata Ahmada	Comoros	1:05.52	
	1	Anita Protti	Switzerland	DNS	
	3	Corinne Simasotchi	Switzerland	DNS	

Final

Rank	Lane	Name	Nationality	Time	Notes
1st place, gold medalist(s)	5	Evelyne Elien	France	52.58	
2nd place, silver medalist(s)	4	Alimata Koné	Ivory Coast	53.32	
3rd place, bronze medalist(s)	3	Marie Line Scholent	France	53.86	
4	7	Michele Lynch	Canada	54.20	
5	6	Louise Ayétotché	Ivory Coast	54.33	
6	8	Mary-Estelle Kapalu	Vanuatu	54.90	
7	1	Judith Fraser	Canada	55.10	
8	2	Andrea Pinnock	Canada	1:17.04	

=== 800 meters ===
Heats

Rank	Heat	Name	Nationality	Time	Notes
1	1	Carmen Stanciu	Romania	2:03.08	Q, GR
2	1	Bouchra Ahlafou	Morocco	2:04.70	Q
3	1	Julie Côté	Quebec	2:05.64	Q
4	1	Alana Yakiwchuk	Canada	2:06.45	q
5	2	Séverine Foulon	France	2:06.74	Q
6	2	Najat Ouali	Morocco	2:06.91	Q
7	2	Jean Fletcher	Canada	2:09.29	Q
8	2	Marie-Jeanne Razanabary	Madagascar	2:10.15	q
9	1	Karine Gerber	Switzerland	2:10.27	
10	2	K.L. Lellise	Congo	2:13.35	
11	2	Tania Fransissi	Luxembourg	2:13.44	
12	1	Peng Bague	Chad	2:16.04	
13	1	Roula Issa	Lebanon	2:35.26	
	2	Dikanda Diba	Zaire	DNS	

Final

Rank	Name	Nationality	Time	Notes
1st place, gold medalist(s)	Carmen Stanciu	Romania	2:05.28	
2nd place, silver medalist(s)	Séverine Foulon	France	2:05.45	
3rd place, bronze medalist(s)	Alana Yakiwchuk	Canada	2:05.56	
4	Najat Ouali	Morocco	2:05.65	
5	Julie Côté	Quebec	2:05.88	
6	Jean Fletcher	Canada	2:06.56	
7	Bouchra Ahlafou	Morocco	2:07.97	
8	Marie-Jeanne Razanabary	Madagascar	2:09.06	

=== 1500 meters ===
Rank	Name	Nationality	Time	Notes
1st place, gold medalist(s)	Cristina Misaros	Romania	4:21.20	
2nd place, silver medalist(s)	Mélanie Choinière	Quebec	4:21.56	
3rd place, bronze medalist(s)	Laurence Vivier	France	4:21.95	
4	Souad Kouhaïl	Morocco	4:21.96	
5	M.C. Stănescu	Romania	4:22.26	
6	Rhonda Robinson	Canada	4:22.48	
7	Cecile Houbart	Wallonia	4:25.04	
8	Sheila Seebaluck	Mauritius	4:27.55	
9	Martine Rasoarimalala	Madagascar	4:34.73	
10	Mirvat Hamze	Lebanon	5:22.27	
	Julie Côté	Quebec	DNF	
	Michelle Cormier	New Brunswick	DNS	
	Blandine Bitzner	France	DNS	
	Lynda Thyer	Quebec	DNS	
	Najat Ouali	Morocco	DNS	
	Dikanda Diba	Zaire	DNS	
	Peng Bague	Chad	DNS	

=== 3000 meters ===
Rank	Name	Nationality	Time	Notes
1st place, gold medalist(s)	Cristina Misaros	Romania	9:02.09	GR
2nd place, silver medalist(s)	Laurence Duquénoy	France	9:06.78	
3rd place, bronze medalist(s)	Courtney Babcock	Canada	9:21.28	
4	M.C. Stănescu	Romania	9:39.43	
5	Lynda Thyer	Quebec	9:40.74	
6	Martine Rasoarimalala	Madagascar	9:43.56	
7	Elizabeth Jones	Canada	9:46.73	
8	Corine Saramandif	Mauritius	9:51.11	
9	Michelle Cormier	New Brunswick	10:36.11	
10	Mima El Hage	Lebanon	11:40.57	
	Mina Maanaoui	Morocco	DNS	
	Arha Ouazizz	Morocco	DNS	

=== 10,000 meters ===
Rank	Name	Nationality	Time	Notes
1st place, gold medalist(s)	Zarha Ouaziz	Morocco	34:04.64	GR
2nd place, silver medalist(s)	Lizanne Bussières	Quebec	34:08.64	
3rd place, bronze medalist(s)	Caroline Rouillard	Quebec	34:43.96	
4	Kimberley Webb	Canada	35:12.36	
	Mina Maanaoui	Morocco	DNF	
	Saovad Kouhail	Morocco	DNS	

=== Marathon ===
Rank	Name	Nationality	Time	Notes
1st place, gold medalist(s)	Cindy New	Quebec	2:54:14	
2nd place, silver medalist(s)	Sonia Agoun	Tunisia	2:54:52	
3rd place, bronze medalist(s)	Isabelle Dittburner	Canada	3:12:28	
4	Virginie Gloum	Central African Republic	3:28:41	
5	Eunice Phillips	New Brunswick	3:34:09	
	Anne Lise Blaser	Switzerland	DNF	
	Maryse Justin	Mauritius	DNF	

=== 100 meters hurdles ===
Heats
Wind:
Heat 1: -0.6 m/s, Heat 2: +0.4 m/s, Heat 3: +0.4 m/s

Rank	Heat	Name	Nationality	Time	Notes
1	1	Anne Piquereau	France	13.37	Q
2	1	Nicole Ramalalanirina	Madagascar	13.40	Q
2	2	Christine Hurtlin	France	13.40	Q
4	1	Donalda Duprey	Canada	13.44	q
4	3	Monique Tourret	France	13.44	Q
6	2	Sylvia Dethier	Wallonia	13.45	Q
7	3	Caroline Deplancke	Wallonia	13.54	Q
8	2	Katie Anderson	Canada	13.56	q
9	2	Veronique Linster	Luxembourg	13.61	
10	3	Tanya Lypka	Canada	13.65	
11	1	Sonia Paquette	Quebec	13.68	
12	3	Mirenda Francourt	Seychelles	14.21	
13	3	Isabelle Schmidt	Switzerland	14.29	
14	1	Myriam Tschomba	Wallonia	14.30	
15	1	Louisette Thobi	Cameroon	14.37	
16	2	Tacko Diouf	Senegal	14.46	
17	3	Nivo Randriarilalao	Madagascar	14.54	
18	2	Mamy Razafimanantsoa	Madagascar	14.77	
19	2	Adetaide Koudougnon	Ivory Coast	14.87	
20	1	Angela Breau	New Brunswick	15.77	

Final
Wind:
-0.7 m/s

Rank	Lane	Name	Nationality	Time	Notes
1st place, gold medalist(s)	4	Nicole Ramalalanirina	Madagascar	13.17	
2nd place, silver medalist(s)	3	Anne Piquereau	France	13.18	
3rd place, bronze medalist(s)	2	Donalda Duprey	Canada	13.27	
4	1	Katie Anderson	Canada	13.41	
5	5	Christine Hurtlin	France	13.51	
6	6	Monique Tourret	France	13.61	
7	7	Sylvia Dethier	Wallonia	13.79	
8	8	Caroline Deplancke	Wallonia	13.86	

=== 400 meters hurdles ===
Heats

Rank	Heat	Name	Nationality	Time	Notes
1	3	Donalda Duprey	Canada	56.66	Q, GR
2	2	Anita Protti	Switzerland	56.77	Q
3	3	Marie Womplou	Ivory Coast	56.96	Q
4	3	Nadia Zatouani	Morocco	57.08	q
5	2	Carole Nelson	France	57.55	Q
6	1	Nezha Bidouane	Morocco	57.65	Q
7	1	Isabelle Dherbécourt	France	58.38	Q
8	3	Sandrine Robin	France	58.55	q
9	3	Celine Jeannet	Switzerland	58.75	
10	1	Cecile Clarinval	Wallonia	58.77	
11	2	Françoise Dethier	Wallonia	59.20	
12	2	Mary-Estelle Kapalu	Vanuatu	59.69	
13	2	Jill McDermid	Canada	59.90	
14	1	Hend Kabaoui	Tunisia	1:00.10	
15	1	Aurélie Jonary	Madagascar	1:00.75	
16	2	Addo Ndala	Congo	1:02.18	
17	3	Sylvia Gaetan	Quebec	1:06.89	

Final

Rank	Lane	Name	Nationality	Time	Notes
1st place, gold medalist(s)	5	Donalda Duprey	Canada	55.10	GR
2nd place, silver medalist(s)	4	Nezha Bidouane	Morocco	55.19	
3rd place, bronze medalist(s)	6	Marie Womplou	Ivory Coast	56.39	
4	3	Anita Protti	Switzerland	56.47	
5	8	Nadia Zatouani	Morocco	56.85	
6	7	Carole Nelson	France	57.20	
7	1	Isabelle Dherbécourt	France	57.56	
8	2	Sandrine Robin	France	58.23	

=== 4 × 100 meters relay ===
Rank	Lane	Nation	Competitors	Time	Notes
1st place, gold medalist(s)	5	France	Patricia Girard, Odiah Sidibé, Fabienne Ficher, Delphine Combe	43.65	
2nd place, silver medalist(s)	6	Canada	France Gareau, Tarama Perry, Dena Burrows, Dionne Wright	45.09	
3rd place, bronze medalist(s)	3	Madagascar	Monica Rahanitraniriana, Hanitriniaina Rakotondrabe, Aurélie Jonary, Lalao Ravaonirina	45.22	
4	2	Cameroon	Sylvie Mballa Éloundou, Georgette Nkoma, Monique Kengné, Louisette Thobi	46.58	
5	7	Ivory Coast	Patricia Foufoué Ziga, Marie Womplou, Alimata Koné, Michelle Akpaline	48.53	
	1	Quebec	Katia Ancelin, Sandra Glazer, Caroline Vachon, Sonia Paquette	DNF	
	8	Guinea	Oumou Sow, Aminata Konate, Aye Keita, Mamaissata Cisse	DQ	
	4	New Brunswick		DNS	

=== 4 × 400 meters relay ===
Rank	Nation	Competitors	Time	Notes
1st place, gold medalist(s)	Canada	Alana Yakiwchuk, Jean Fletcher, Judith Fraser, Stacy Bowen	3:38.12	
2nd place, silver medalist(s)	Ivory Coast	Louise Ayétotché, Patricia Foufoué Ziga, Véronique Kouamé, Alimata Koné	3:41.48	
3rd place, bronze medalist(s)	Morocco	Bouchra Lahlafou, Najat Ouali, Souhad Kouhail, Nadia Zetouani	3:47.98	
	Switzerland		DNS	
	Quebec		DNS	

=== 10,000 meters walk ===
Rank	Name	Nationality	Time	Notes
1st place, gold medalist(s)	Janice McCaffrey	Canada	45:38.06	GR
2nd place, silver medalist(s)	Valérie Nadaud	France	46:01.77	
3rd place, bronze medalist(s)	Pascale Grand	Quebec	46:40.88	
4	Allison Baker	Canada	48:09.88	
5	Tina Poitras	Quebec	48:42.14	
6	Nora Leksir	France	49:05.81	
	Nadine Mazuir	France	DNF	

=== High jump ===
Rank	Name	Nationality	Result	Notes
1st place, gold medalist(s)	Monica Iagăr	Romania	1.89	GR
2nd place, silver medalist(s)	Isabelle Jeanne	France	1.89	GR
3rd place, bronze medalist(s)	Lucienne N'Da	Ivory Coast	1.87	
4	Nathalie Lefebvre	France	1.85	
5	Katell Courgeon	France	1.85	
6	Roberta Waldner	Canada	1.82	
7	Corina Wolf	Canada	1.76	
8	Nathalie Belfort	Quebec	1.76	
9	Claudia Frossard	Switzerland	1.72	
10	Treva Thomas	New Brunswick	1.68	
11	Gabrielle Deshong	Quebec	1.68	
12	Mary Dolly Zé Oyono	Cameroon	1.64	
13	Pascale Fulcher	Quebec	1.64	

=== Long jump ===
Rank	Name	Nationality	Result	Notes
1st place, gold medalist(s)	Nadine Caster	France	6.58	
2nd place, silver medalist(s)	Anastasia Mahob	France	6.36	
3rd place, bronze medalist(s)	Sandrine Hennart	Wallonia	6.09	
4	Simone Lemieux	Quebec	5.85	
5	Caroline Vachon	Quebec	5.85	
6	Béryl Laramé	Seychelles	5.84	
7	Lana Jolly	Canada	5.81	
8	Tanya Lypka	Canada	5.79	
9	Edith Ratoandronarivo	Madagascar	5.62	
10	Françoise Ngo Bang	Cameroon	5.62	
11	Brigitte Rampizafy	Madagascar	5.60	
12	Sophie Badji	Senegal	5.60	
13	Sylvie Kaboré	Burkina Faso	5.54	
14	Khardiata Diedhiou	Senegal	5.27	
15	Brianie Massaka-Youlou	Congo	5.26	
16	Lucie Pierre-Louis	Haiti	4.89	
	Rodica Petrescu	Romania	DNS	
	Hasna Aatillah	Morocco	DNS	

=== Triple jump ===
Rank	Name	Nationality	Result	Notes
1st place, gold medalist(s)	Rodica Petrescu	Romania	14.33	
2nd place, silver medalist(s)	Sandrine Domain	France	13.58	
3rd place, bronze medalist(s)	Valérie Guiyoule	France	13.57	
4	Stephanie Bedga	Cameroon	13.00	
5	Betty Lise	France	12.87	
6	Hasna Aatillah	Morocco	12.44	
7	Sonya Agbéssi	Benin	12.43	
8	Mirenda Francourt	Seychelles	12.24	
9	Edith Ratoandronarivo	Madagascar	12.20	
10	Simone Lemieux	Quebec	12.19	
11	Oumi Dia	Senegal	12.14	
12	Béryl Laramé	Seychelles	11.82	
13	Khardiata Diedhiou	Senegal	11.81	
	Aye Keita	Guinea	NM	
	Adélaïde Koudougnon	Ivory Coast	NM	

=== Shot put ===
Rank	Name	Nationality	Result	Notes
1st place, gold medalist(s)	Nathalie Ganguillet	Switzerland	16.32	GR
2nd place, silver medalist(s)	Georgette Reed	Canada	16.29	
3rd place, bronze medalist(s)	Annick Lefebvre	France	15.46	
4	Fouzia Fatihi	Morocco	15.35	
5	Marie-France Best	France	14.86	
6	Marie Brouzet	France	14.75	
7	Erin Breaugh	Canada	14.36	
8	Michelle Fournier	Quebec	12.56	
9	Oumo Traoré	Mali	12.32	
	Hanan Ahmed Khaled	Egypt	DNS	

=== Discus throw ===
Rank	Name	Nationality	Result	Notes
1st place, gold medalist(s)	Nicoleta Grasu	Romania	60.84	GR
2nd place, silver medalist(s)	Manuela Tirneci	Romania	56.94	
3rd place, bronze medalist(s)	Agnès Teppe	France	54.48	
4	Isabelle Devaluez	France	54.28	
5	Monia Kari	Tunisia	53.58	
6	Zoubida Laayouni	Morocco	53.12	
7	Latifa Allam	Morocco	51.68	
8	Nathalie Ganguillet	Switzerland	48.80	
9	Theresa Brick	Canada	47.84	
10	Hanan Ahmed Khaled	Egypt	47.54	
11	Catherine Griffin	Canada	44.84	
12	Michelle Fournier	Quebec	42.68	
13	Wendy Philips	New Brunswick	41.62	
14	Caroline Fournier	Mauritius	40.42	
15	Karine Rondeau	Quebec	37.84	
16	Jeanette Ayoub	Lebanon	33.82	

=== Javelin throw ===
Rank	Name	Nationality	Result	Notes
1st place, gold medalist(s)	Nathalie Teppe	France	57.44	GR
2nd place, silver medalist(s)	Martine Bègue	France	56.54	
3rd place, bronze medalist(s)	Valerie Tulloch	Canada	55.94	
4	Nadine Auzeil	France	55.80	
5	Karen Wilkinson	Canada	54.56	
6	Rkia Ramoudi	Morocco	49.46	
7	Isabelle Surprenant	Quebec	48.40	
8	Victoire Omam	Cameroon	29.10	
	Pauline Makdessi	Lebanon	DNS	
	Marie Antoin Marshal	Burkina Faso	DNS	

=== Heptathlon ===
The highest mark recorded in each event is highlighted in yellow

Rank	Athlete	Nationality	100m H	HJ	SP	200m	LJ	JT	800m	Points	Notes
1st place, gold medalist(s)	Kim Vanderhoek	Canada	14.25	1.72	12.71	24.86	5.81	47.78	2:37.47	5641	GR
2nd place, silver medalist(s)	Véronique Villefayot	France	14.59	1.63	10.05	25.99	5.45	45.90	2:14.33	5368	
3rd place, bronze medalist(s)	Kendall Matheson	Canada	14.79	1.60	11.69	25.59	5.95	34.42	2:27.08	5205	
4	Dolly Marie Zé Oyono	Cameroon	15.36	1.57	12.02	25.40	5.77	29.38	2:32.15	4919	
5	Isabelle Belanger	Quebec	14.74	1.66	10.70	26.35	5.56	30.98	2:35.88	4857	
	Victoire Omam	Cameroon	16.27	1.51	8.74	DNS	–	–	–	DNF	
	Kongombé	Central African Republic	16.56	NM	DNF	DNS	–	–	–	DNF	
	Marie Antoin Marshal	Burkina Faso	DNS	–	–	–	–	–	–	DNS	
