= Athletics at the 1994 Jeux de la Francophonie =

II Jeux de la Francophonie
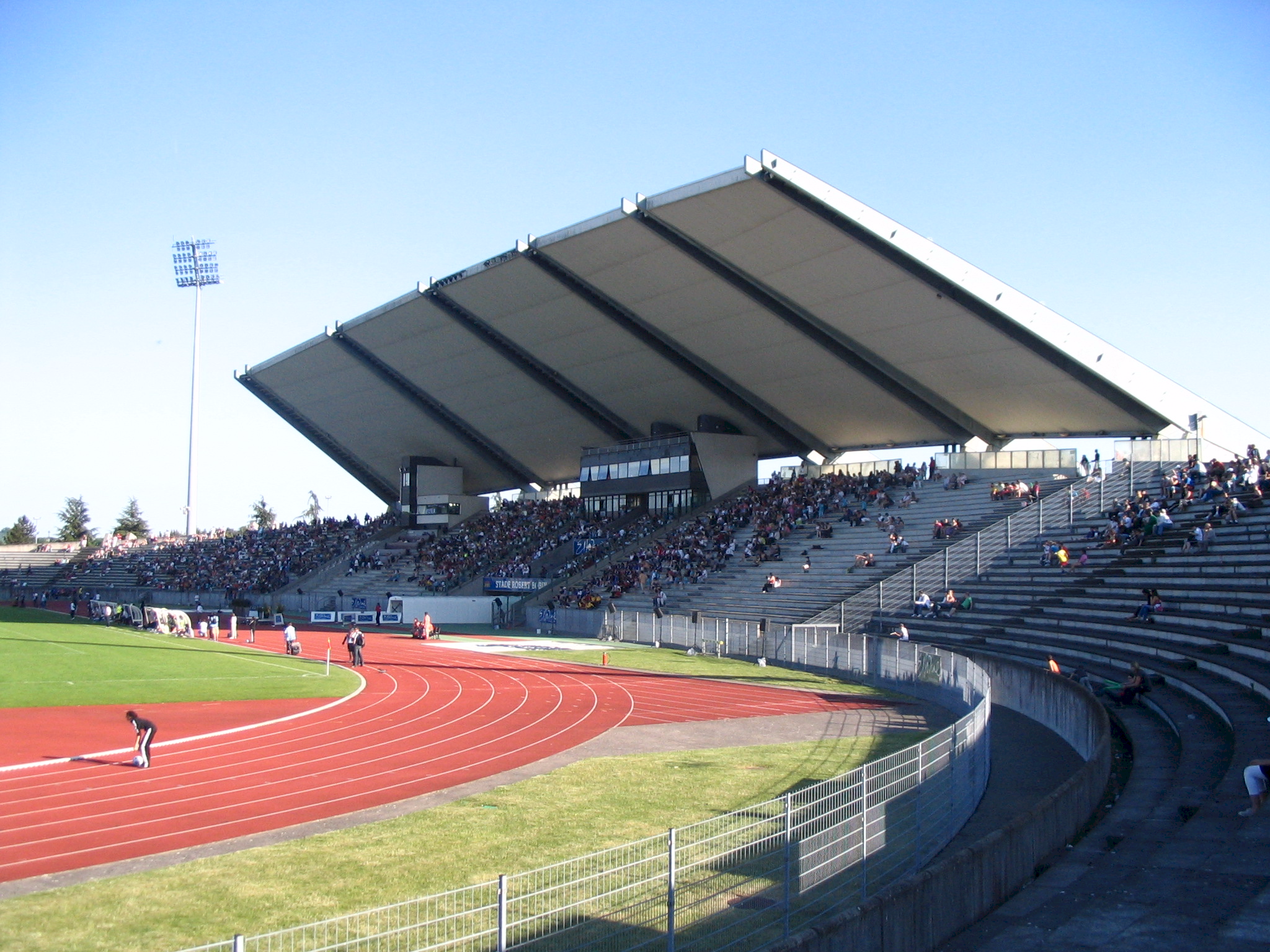
- The host venue (shown in 2010)
- Dates: 11 – 13 July
- Host city: Bondoufle, France
- Venue: Stade Robert Bobin
- Events: 43
- Participation: c. 537 athletes from 40 nations
- Records set: 22 Games records

At the 1994 Jeux de la Francophonie, the athletics events were held in Bondoufle, near Paris, France. A total of 43 events were contested, of which 23 by male and 20 by female athletes.

== Medal summary ==
=== Men ===
Event	Gold		Silver		Bronze	
100 metres	Bruny Surin (Quebec)	10.08 GR	Donovan Bailey (CAN)	10.27	Oumar Loum (SEN)	10.35
200 metres	Hermann Lomba (FRA)	20.90	Ricardo Greenidge (CAN)	21.16	Thierry Lubin (FRA)	21.16
400 metres	Pierre-Marie Hilaire (FRA)	46.16	Hachim Ndiaye (SEN)	46.32	Désiré Pierre-Louis (MRI)	46.50
800 metres	Mahjoub Haïda (MAR)	1:50.48	Ousmane Diarra (FRA)	1:50.79	William Best (New Brunswick)	1:51.23
1500 metres	Azzedine Sediki (MAR)	3:42.57	Abdelkader Chékhémani (FRA)	3:43.08	Hicham El Guerrouj (MAR)	3:43.54
5000 metres	Salah Hissou (MAR)	13:22.08 GR	Brahim Lahlafi (MAR)	13:25.91	Brahim Jabbour (MAR)	14:01.64
10,000 metres	Salah Hissou (MAR)	28:34.25 GR	Hammou Boutayeb (MAR)	28:35.88	Khalid Boulami (MAR)	28:48.43
Marathon	Tahar Mansouri (TUN)	2:17:18 GR	Abdelkader El Mouaziz (MAR)	2:21:29	Abdillahi Omar (DJI)	2:25:27
110 metres hurdles	Dan Philibert (FRA)	13.55 GR	Jonathan Nsenga (BEL)	13.56	Tim Kroeker (CAN)	13.68
400 metres hurdles	Fadhel Khayati (TUN)	49.52	Marc Dollendorf (BEL)	50.03	Ibou Faye (SEN)	50.25
3000 m s'chase	Khalid Skah (MAR)	8:19.30 GR	Elarbi Khattabi (MAR)	8:23.13	Hilaire Ntirampéba (BDI)	8:36.19 NR
4×100 metres relay	Canada (CAN); Sheridon Baptiste; Glenroy Gilbert; Peter Ogilvie; Donovan Bailey	39.16	Ivory Coast (CIV); Ouattara Lagazane; Jean-Olivier Zirignon; Frank Waota; Ibrahim Meité	39.38	France (FRA); Olivier Laroche; Sébastien Carrat; Hermann Lomba; Thierry Lubin	39.87
4×400 metres relay	Senegal (SEN); Ibrahima Wade; Moustapha Diarra; Aboubakry Dia; Hachim Ndiaye	3:05.73	Morocco (MAR); Mohamed Debbab; Brahim Lahlafi; Bouchaib Belkaid; Benyounès Lahlou	3:06.67	Canada (CAN); Antony Wilson; Kelly Crerar; Ahlosen Isaac; Byron Goodwin	3:07.71
20 km walk	Jean-Olivier Brosseau (FRA)	1:25:48 GR	Martial Fesselier (FRA)	1:26:52	Martin St. Pierre (Quebec)	1:27:07
High jump	Cory Siermachesky (CAN)	2.20	Richard Duncan (CAN)	2.20	Pierre Bernard (FRA)	2.18
Pole vault	Gérald Baudouin (FRA)	5.60	Jean-Marc Tailhardat (FRA)	5.50	Alain Andji (FRA)	5.30
Long jump	Cheikh Touré (SEN)	8.06 GR	Jérôme Romain (DMA)	7.81	Franck Zio (BUR)	7.75
Triple jump	Edrick Floreal (Quebec)	16.83	Alex Norca (FRA)	16.72	Garfield Anselm (FRA)	16.58
Shot put	Gheorghe Guset (ROM)	19.67 GR	Scott Cappos (CAN)	17.07	Rocky Vaitanaki (FRA)	16.83
Discus throw	Costel Grasu (ROM)	61.24 GR	Mickaël Conjungo (CAF)	60.40	Marcel Tîrle (ROM)	58.32
Hammer throw	Gilles Dupray (FRA)	74.94 GR	Frédéric Kuhn (FRA)	72.20	Walter Ciofani (FRA)	71.72
Javelin throw	Grégory Wiesner (SUI)	75.12 GR	Maher Ridane (TUN)	70.72	Charlus Bertimon (FRA)	70.66
Decathlon	Christian Mandrou (CAN)	7766 pts	Cédric Lopez (FRA)	7709 pts	Jamel Bourmada (FRA)	7526 pts

=== Women ===
Event	Gold		Silver		Bronze	
100 metres	Patricia Girard (FRA)	11.46	Odiah Sidibé (FRA)	11.59	Lalao Ravaonirina (MAD)	11.67
200 metres	Stacy Bowen (CAN)	23.19	Delphine Combe (FRA)	23.35	Fabienne Ficher (FRA)	23.60
400 metres	Evelyne Elien (FRA)	52.58	Alimata Koné (CIV)	53.32	Marie-Line Scholent (FRA)	53.86
800 metres	Carmen Stanciu (ROM)	2:05.28	Séverine Foulon (FRA)	2:05.45	Alana Yakiwchuk (CAN)	2:05.56
1500 metres	Cristina Misaros (ROM)	4:21.20	Mélanie Choinière (Quebec)	4:21.56	Laurence Vivier (FRA)	4:21.95
3000 metres	Cristina Misaros (ROM)	9:02.09 GR	Laurence Duquénoy (FRA)	9:06.78	Courtney Babcock (CAN)	9:21.28
10,000 metres	Zahra Ouaziz (MAR)	34:04.64 GR	Lizanne Bussières (Quebec)	34:08.64	Carole Rouillard (Quebec)	34:43.96
Marathon	Cindy New (Quebec)	2:54:14	Sonia Agoun (TUN)	2:54:52	Isabelle Dittberner (CAN)	3:12:28
100 metres hurdles	Nicole Ramalalanirina (MAD)	13.17	Anne Piquereau (FRA)	13.18	Donalda Duprey (CAN)	13.27
400 metres hurdles	Donalda Duprey (CAN)	55.10 GR	Nezha Bidouane (MAR)	55.19	Marie Womplou (CIV)	56.39 NR
4 × 100 metres relay	France (FRA); Patricia Girard; Odiah Sidibé; Fabienne Ficher; Delphine Combe	43.65	Canada (CAN); France Gareau; Tarama Perry; Dena Burrows; Dionne Wright	45.09	Madagascar (MAD); Monica Rahanitraniriana; Hanitriniaina Rakotondrabe; Aurélie Jonary; Lalao Ravaonirina	45.22
4 × 400 metres relay	Canada (CAN); Alana Yakiwchuk; Jean Fletcher; Judith Fraser; Stacy Bowen	3:38.12	Ivory Coast (CIV); Louise Ayétotché; Patricia Foufoué Ziga; Véronique Kouamé; Alimata Koné	3:41.48	Morocco (MAR); Bouchra Lahlafou; Najat Ouali; Souhad Kouhail; Nadia Zetouani	3:47.98
10 km walk	Janice McCaffrey (CAN)	45:38.06 GR	Valérie Nadaud (FRA)	46:01.77	Pascale Grand (Quebec)	46:40.88
High jump	Monica Iagar (ROM)	1.89 GR	Isabelle Jeanne (FRA)	1.89	Lucienne N'Da (CIV)	1.87
Long jump	Nadine Caster (FRA)	6.58	Anastasia Mahob (FRA)	6.36	Sandrine Hennart (BEL)	6.09
Triple jump	Rodica Petrescu (ROM)	14.33	Sandrine Domain (FRA)	13.58	Valérie Guiyoule (FRA)	13.57
Shot put	Nathalie Ganguillet (SUI)	16.32 GR	Georgette Reed (CAN)	16.29	Annick Lefebvre (FRA)	15.46
Discus throw	Nicoleta Grasu (ROM)	60.80 GR	Manuela Tîrneci (ROM)	56.94	Agnès Teppe (FRA)	54.48
Javelin throw	Nathalie Teppe (FRA)	57.44 GR	Martine Bègue (FRA)	56.54	Valerie Tulloch (CAN)	55.94
Heptathlon	Kim Vanderhoek (CAN)	5641 pts GR	Véronique Villefayot (FRA)	5368 pts	Kendall Matheson (CAN)	5205 pts

== Medal table ==
* Host nation (France)

Rank	Nation	Gold	Silver	Bronze	Total
1	France*	11	18	15	44
2	Canada	8	6	8	22
3	Romania	8	1	1	10
4	Morocco	6	6	4	16
5	Quebec	3	2	3	8
6	Tunisia	2	2	0	4
7	Senegal	2	1	2	5
8	Switzerland	2	0	0	2
9	Madagascar	1	0	2	3
10	Ivory Coast	0	3	2	5
11	Belgium	0	2	1	3
12	Central African Republic	0	1	0	1
12	Dominica	0	1	0	1
14	Burkina Faso	0	0	1	1
14	Burundi	0	0	1	1
14	Djibouti	0	0	1	1
14	Mauritius	0	0	1	1
14	New Brunswick	0	0	1	1
Totals (18 entries)		43	43	43	129

== Participating nations ==
- Benin (3)
- Burkina Faso (4)
- Burundi (9)
- Cambodia (2)
- Cameroon (20)
- Canada (62)
- Cape Verde (2)
- Central African Republic (12)
- Chad (2)
- Comoros (4)
- Congo (10)
- Ivory Coast (23)
- Djibouti (7)
- Dominica (7)
- Egypt (5)
- France (80)
- Gabon (7)
- Guinea (9)
- Guinea-Bissau (3)
- Haiti (6)
- Lebanon (15)
- Luxembourg (4)
- Madagascar (17)
- Mali (5)
- Mauritania (3)
- Mauritius (16)
- Morocco (36)
- New Brunswick (13)
- Niger (2)
- Quebec (45)
- Romania (10)
- Saint Lucia (10)
- Senegal (21)
- Seychelles (6)
- Switzerland (18)
- Togo (4)
- Tunisia (12)
- Vanuatu (4)
- Wallonia (16)
- Zaire (3)
