= Athletics at the Jeux de la Francophonie =

Athletics is one of the sports at the quadrennial Jeux de la Francophonie (Francophone Games) competition. It has been one of the sports held at the event since the inaugural edition in 1989.

== Editions ==
Games	Year	Host city	Host country
I	1989	Casablanca and Rabat,	Morocco
II	1994	Paris (Évry) and Bondoufle	France
III	1997	Antananarivo	Madagascar
IV	2001	Ottawa and Gatineau	Canada
V	2005	Niamey	Niger
VI	2009	Beirut	Lebanon
VII	2013	Nice	France
VIII	2017	Abidjan	Ivory Coast
IX	2023	Kinshasa	Democratic Republic of the Congo

== Jeux de la Francophonie records ==
=== Men ===
Event	Record	Athlete	Nationality	Date	Games	Place	Ref.
100 m	10.03 (+0.1 m/s)	Emmanuel Eseme	Cameroon	31 July 2023	2023	Kinshasa, Democratic Republic of the Congo	
200 m	20.20 (+1.1 m/s)	Daniel Sangouma	France	July 1989	1989	Casablanca, Morocco	
400 m	44.86	Shane Niemi	Canada	July 2001	2001	Ottawa, Canada	
800 m	1:46.53	Khalid Tighazouine	Morocco	July 2001	2001	Ottawa, Canada	
1500 m	3:40.25	Hassan Ouhrouch	Morocco	July 1989	1989	Casablanca, Morocco	
5000 m	13:22.08	Salah Hissou	Morocco	July 1989	1989	Casablanca, Morocco	
10,000 m	28:13.54	Ahmed Baday	Morocco	July 2001	2001	Ottawa, Canada	
Half marathon	1:02:48	Moumin Bouh Guelleh	Djibouti	4 August 2023	2023	Kinshasa, Democratic Republic of the Congo	
Marathon	2:17:03	Rachid Kisri	Morocco	16 December 2005	2005	Niamey, Niger	
110 m hurdles	13.38 (+0.7 m/s)	Louis François Mendy	Senegal	1 August 2023	2023	Kinshasa, Democratic Republic of the Congo	
400 m hurdles	49.22	Alejandro Argudín-Zaharia	Romania	1997	1997	Antananarivo, Madagascar	
3000 m steeplechase	8:16.63	Elarbi Khattabi	Morocco	July 2001	2001	Ottawa, Canada	
High jump	2.31 m	Mark Boswell	Canada	July 2001	2001	Ottawa, Canada	
Pole vault	5.65 m	Ferenc Salbert	France	July 1989	1989	Casablanca, Morocco	
Long jump	8.40 m (+0.1 m/s)	Yahya Berrabah	Morocco	2 October 2009	2009	Beirut, Lebanon	
Triple jump	17.15 m	Arius Filet	France	23 July 2001	2001	Ottawa, Canada	
Shot put	20.18 m	Tomasz Majewski	Poland	10 September 2013	2013	Nice, France	
Discus throw	65.10 m	Jason Tunks	Canada	July 2001	2001	Ottawa, Canada	
Hammer throw	79.89 m	Szymon Ziółkowski	Poland	July 2001	2001	Ottawa, Canada	
Javelin throw	84.75 m	Alexandru Novac	Romania	4 August 2023	2023	Kinshasa, Democratic Republic of the Congo	
Decathlon	8160 pts	Mike Smith	Canada	July 1989	1989	Casablanca, Morocco	
Decathlon	100m (wind) / Long jump (wind) / Shot put / High jump / 400m / 110m H (wind) / Discus / Pole vault / Javelin / 1500m						
20 km walk (road)	1:22:56	Hatem Ghoula	Tunisia	July 2001	2001	Ottawa, Canada	
4 × 100 m relay	38.75	Max Morinière; Daniel Sangouma; Jean-Charles Trouabal; Bruno Marie-Rose	France	18 July 1989	1989	Casablanca, Morocco	
4 × 400 m relay	3:02.20	Seydou Loum; Hachim Ndiaye; Alpha Babacar Sall; Ibrahima Wade	Senegal	5 September 1997	1997	Antananarivo, Madagascar	

=== Women ===
Event	Record	Athlete	Nationality	Date	Games	Place	Ref.
100 m	11.14	Laurence Bily	France	July 1989	1989	Casablanca, Morocco	
200 m	22.43 (−0.7 m/s)	Jessika Gbai	Ivory Coast	4 August 2023	2023	Kinshasa, Democratic Republic of the Congo	
400 m	50.92	Amy Mbacké Thiam	Senegal	July 2001	2001	Ottawa, Canada	
800 m	2:00.71	Malika Akkaoui	Morocco	24 July 2017	2017	Abidjan, Ivory Coast	
1500 m	4:11.15	Fatima Aouam	Morocco	July 1989	1989	Casablanca, Morocco	
3000 m	9:02.09	Cristina Misaros	Romania	July 1994	1994	Paris, France	
5000 m	15:56.71	Rahma Tahiri	Morocco	3 August 2023	2023	Kinshasa, Democratic Republic of the Congo	
10,000 m	32:29.14	Diane Nukuri-Johnson	Burundi	13 September 2013	2013	Nice, France	
Half marathon	1:13:23	Rahma Tahiri	Morocco	4 August 2023	2023	Kinshasa, Democratic Republic of the Congo	
Marathon	2:44:00	Michèle Leservoisier	France	July 2001	2001	Ottawa, Canada	
100 m hurdles	12.92	Monique Éwanjé-Épée	France	July 1989	1989	Casablanca, Morocco	
100 m hurdles	12.92 (−0.5 m/s)	Perdita Felicien	Canada	20 July 2001	2001	Ottawa, Canada	
400 m hurdles	54.91	Nezha Bidouane	Morocco	July 2001	2001	Ottawa, Canada	
3000 m steeplechase	9:46.82	Ancuta Bobocel	Romania	12 September 2013	2013	Nice, France	
High jump	1.91 m	Wanita May	Canada	July 2001	2001	Ottawa, Canada	
Pole vault	4.40 m	Marion Lotout	France	11 September 2013	2013	Nice, France	
Long jump	6.94 m (+1.2 m/s)	Marthe Koala	Burkina Faso	2 August 2023	2023	Kinshasa, Democratic Republic of the Congo	
Triple jump	14.62 m	Cristina Nicolau	Romania	July 2001	2001	Ottawa, Canada	
Shot put	18.25 m	Krystyna Zabawska	Poland	July 2001	2001	Ottawa, Canada	
Discus throw	64.53 m	Nicoleta Grasu	Romania	July 2001	2001	Ottawa, Canada	
Hammer throw	75.62 m	Anita Włodarczyk	Poland	13 September 2013	2013	Nice, France	
Javelin throw	57.48 m	Lindy Agricole	Seychelles	4 October 2009	2009	Beirut, Lebanon	
Heptathlon	5719 pts	Marie Collonvillé	France	July 2001	2001	Ottawa, Canada	
Heptathlon	100m H (wind) / High jump / Shot put / 200m (wind) / Long jump (wind) / Javelin / 800m						
10 km walk (road)	44:32	Norica Câmpean	Romania	July 2001	2001	Ottawa, Canada	
20 km walk (road)	1:37:23	Laure Polli	Switzerland	14 September 2013	2013	Nice, France	
4 × 100 m relay	43.38	Laurence Bily; Patricia Girard; Françoise Leroux; Marie-Christine Dubois	France	July 1989	1989	Casablanca, Morocco	
4 × 400 m relay	3:28.97		Poland	July 2001	2001	Ottawa, Canada	
