= Judo at the Jeux de la Francophonie =

Judo competition

- Current event or competition: Judo at the 2027 Jeux de la Francophonie

Competition details
- Discipline: Judo
- Type: Quadrennial
- Organiser: Comité international des Jeux de la Francophonie (CIJF)

History
- First edition: Casablanca 1989
- Editions: 9
- Most recent: Kinshasa 2023
- Next edition: Yerevan 2027

Judo is one of the sports at the quadrennial Jeux de la Francophonie (Francophone Games) competition. It has been one of the sports held at the event since the inaugural edition in 1989.

== Editions ==
Edition	Games	Host city	Host country	Ref.
I	1989	Casablanca and Rabat	Morocco	
II	1994	Paris (Évry) and Bondoufle	France	
III	1997	Antananarivo	Madagascar	
IV	2001	Ottawa and Gatineau	Canada	
V	2005	Niamey	Niger	
VI	2009	Beirut	Lebanon	
VII	2013	Nice	France	
VIII	2017	Abidjan	Ivory Coast	
IX	2023	Kinshasa	Democratic Republic of the Congo	
X	2027	Yerevan	Armenia	
