= Ricardo Greenidge =

Canadian sprinter and bobsledder

Ricardo Dillon Greenidge
Personal information
- Born: 12 February 1971 (age 54) Ottawa, Ontario
- Height: 1.85 m (6 ft 1 in)
- Weight: 93 kg (205 lb)

Sport
- Sport: Athletics
- Event: 200 metres
- Club: Ottawa Lions

Ricardo Greenidge (born 12 February 1971) is a Canadian retired sprinter and bobsledder. He represented his country in the four-man bobsled at the 1998 Winter Olympics finishing ninth. His biggest success of his athletics career was a silver medal in the 200 metres at the 1994 Jeux de la Francophonie.

== Competition record ==
Year	Competition	Venue	Position	Event	Notes
Representing Canada
1990	World Junior Championships	Plovdiv, Bulgaria	18th (qf)	100 m	10.69
1990	World Junior Championships	Plovdiv, Bulgaria	22nd (sf)	200 m	21.79
1990	World Junior Championships	Plovdiv, Bulgaria	15th (h)	4 × 100 m relay	41.88
1993	World Indoor Championships	Toronto, Ontario, Canada	19th (h)	200 m	21.60
1994	Jeux de la Francophonie	Bondoufle, France	2nd	200 m	21.16
1994	Commonwealth Games	Victoria, British Columbia, Canada	15th (sf)	200 m	21.43

== Personal bests ==
Outdoor

- 100 metres – 10.37 (+1.4 m/s, Victoria 1994)
- 200 metres – 20.61 (+0.8 m/s, Odessa 1994)

Indoor

- 60 metres – 6.91 (Saskatoon 1999)
- 200 metres – 21.60 (Toronto 1993)
