= France Gareau =

Canadian sprinter (born 1967)

Personal information
- Born: April 15, 1967 (age 59) Verner, Ontario, Canada

Sport
- Sport: Track and field
Medal record
Representing Canada
Olympic Games
Silver medal – second place	1984 Los Angeles	4 x 100 metres
Francophone Games
Silver medal – second place	1989 Casablanca	4 x 100 metres
Silver medal – second place	1989 Casablanca	4 x 400 metres
Gold medal – first place	1994 Paris	4 x 400 metres
Silver medal – second place	1994 Paris	4 x 100 metres
Commonwealth Games
Bronze medal – third place	1990 Auckland	4 x 400 metres
Summer Universiade
Bronze medal – third place	1993 Buffalo	4 x 100 metres

France Gareau (born April 15, 1967) is a Canadian athlete, who competed in the sprint events. Gareau was born in Verner, Ontario.

Gareau went to school in

- École secondaire catholique Franco-Cité in Sturgeon Falls/Plattenet, Ontario, where she competed as a standout high school track athlete. [1]
- York University in Toronto, where she earned a Bachelor of Arts degree in French Studies in 1991. While competing for the York Lions, she was named the university's Female Athlete of the Year in 1988 and was later inducted into their Hall of Fame. [1, 2, 3]

Gareau competed for Canada in the 1984 Summer Olympics held in Los Angeles, United States in the 100 metres and the 4 x 100 metres relay, where she anchored Canada to the silver medal (as a 17-year-old) with her teammates Angela Bailey, Marita Payne and Angella Taylor-Issajenko. Gareau also won relay medals at the 1990 Commonwealth Games, 1993 Summer Universiade and at two Francophone Games.

Gareau was also Canadian champion at the 100 metres in 1989.

== Personal life ==
She is married to former Ottawa Rough Riders and BC Lions player Sean Foudy. Their sons Liam and Jean-Luc are ice hockey players. Liam was selected in the first round of the 2018 NHL entry draft by the Columbus Blue Jackets. Jean-Luc was selected in the third round of the 2020 NHL entry draft by the Colorado Avalanche.
