= Athletics at the 1989 Jeux de la Francophonie =

Athletics at the I Jeux de la Francophonie
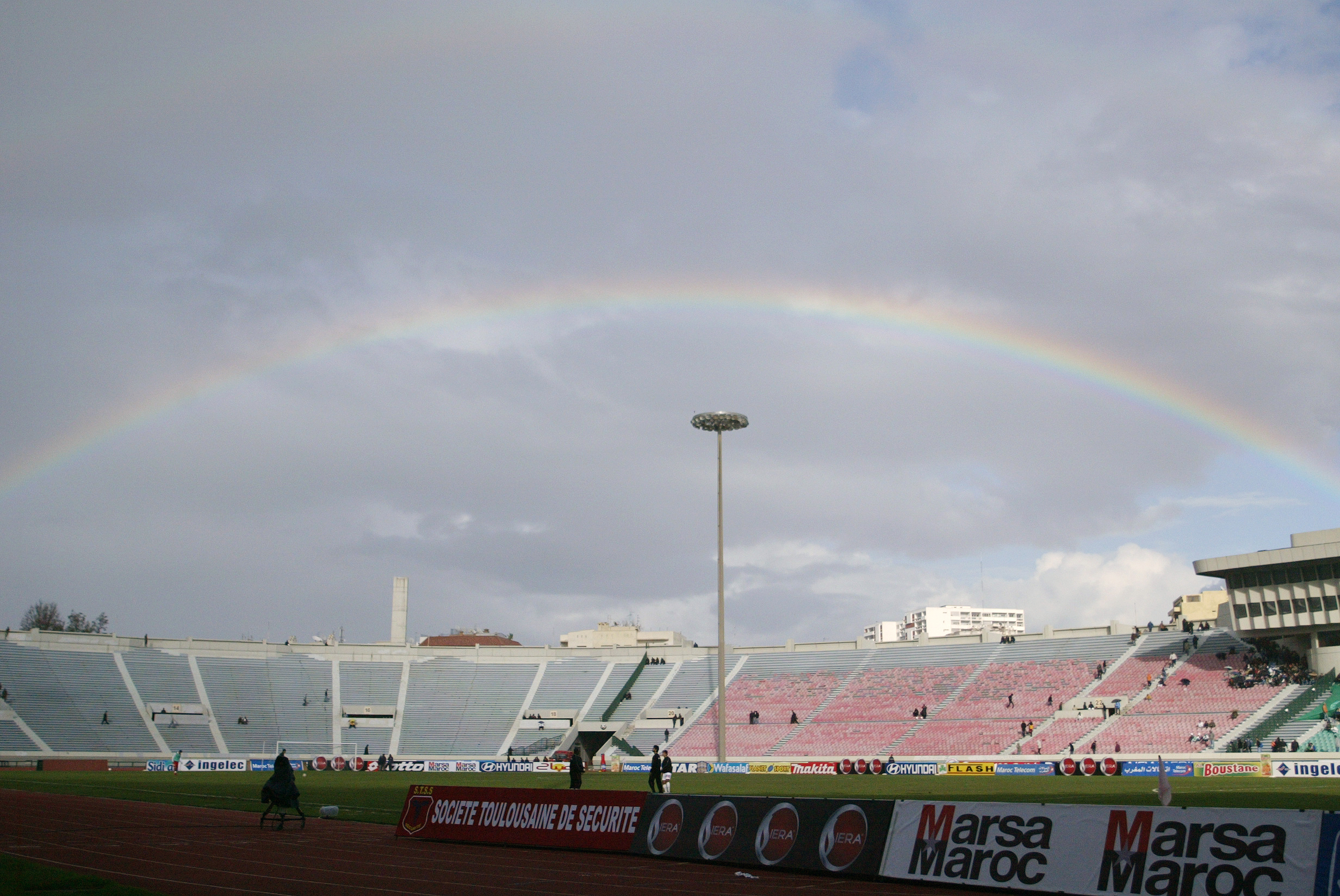
- Dates: 12–17 July 1989
- Host city: Casablanca, Morocco
- Venue: Stade Mohammed V
- Events: 41

At the 1989 Jeux de la Francophonie, the athletics events were held in Casablanca, Morocco from 12 to 17 July.

== Medal summary ==
=== Men ===
Event	Gold		Silver		Bronze	
100 metres	Daniel Sangouma (FRA)	10.17	Bruno Marie-Rose (FRA)	10.18	Max Morinière (FRA)	10.29
200 metres	Daniel Sangouma (FRA)	20.20	Bruno Marie-Rose (FRA)	20.58	Jean-Charles Trouabal (FRA)	20.71
400 metres	Gabriel Tiacoh (CIV)	44.93	Anton Skerritt (CAN)	46.10	Hachim Ndiaye (SEN)	46.28
800 metres	Moussa Fall (SEN)	1:46.78	Faouzi Lahbi (MAR)	1:47.08	Babacar Niang (SEN)	1:47.18
1500 metres	Hassan Ouhrouch (MAR)	3:40.25	Eric Dubus (FRA)	3:40.54	Mustapha Lachaal (MAR)	3:40.58
5000 metres	Saïd Aouita (MAR)	13:36.19	Khalid Skah (MAR)	13:39.01	Mohamed Issangar (MAR)	13:47.89
10,000 metres	Brahim Boutayeb (MAR)	28:53.11	Hammou Boutayeb (MAR)	28:55.61	Jean-Louis Prianon (FRA)	29:20.00
Marathon	Youssouf Doukal (DJI)	2:19:18	Abdi Doudoub (DJI)	2:23:10	Mohamed Abdi (DJI)	2:25:54
110 metres hurdles	Philippe Aubert (FRA)	13.84	Vincent Clarico (FRA)	13.96	Judex Lefou (MRI)	14.06
400 metres hurdles	Amadou Dia Bâ (SEN)	49.47	Philippe Gonigam (FRA)	49.89	John Graham (CAN)	50.12
3000 m s'chase	Graeme Fell (CAN)	8:27.91	Bruno Le Stum (FRA)	8:29.82	Joseph Mahmoud (FRA)	8:30.60
4×100 metres relay	France (FRA); Max Morinière; Daniel Sangouma; Jean-Charles Trouabal; Bruno Marie-Rose	38.75	Canada (CAN); Everton Anderson; Mike Dwyer; Anton Skerritt; Brian Morrison	40.07	Ivory Coast (CIV)	40.31
4×400 metres relay	Senegal (SEN); Ibou Faye; Babacar Niang; Moussa Fall; Hachim Ndiaye	3:04.69	France (FRA); Emmanuel Esdras; Pascal Maran; Jacques Farraudière; Philippe Gonigam	3:06.24	Canada (CAN); Brian Dicker; Ian Newhouse; John Graham; Anton Skerritt	3:06.93
20 km walk	Guillaume Leblanc (CAN)	1:27:27	Jean-Claude Corré (FRA)	1:28:39	Thierry Toutain (FRA)	1:35:08
High jump	Jean-Charles Gicquel (FRA)	2.22	Joël Vincent (FRA)	2.19	Dominique Hernandez (FRA)	2.19
Pole vault	Ferenc Salbert (FRA)	5.65	Jean-Marc Tailhardat (FRA)	5.50	Philippe d'Encausse (FRA)	5.35
Long jump	Edrick Floreal (CAN)	7.84	Glenroy Gilbert (CAN)	7.79	Norbert Brige (FRA)	7.75
Triple jump	Toussaint Rabenala (MAD)	16.97	Pierre Camara (FRA)	16.87	Edrick Floreal (CAN)	16.69
Shot put	Luc Viudès (FRA)	19.11	Patrick Journoud (FRA)	17.64	Lorne Hilton (CAN)	17.55
Discus throw	Patrick Journoud (FRA)	58.76	Ray Lazdins (CAN)	56.14	Sandor Katona (FRA)	52.36
Hammer throw	Raphaël Piolanti (FRA)	73.16	Walter Ciofani (FRA)	72.18	Frédéric Kuhn (FRA)	72.12
Javelin throw	Jean-Paul Lakafia (FRA)	73.38	Pascal Lefevre (FRA)	72.80	Alain Storaci (FRA)	70.04
Decathlon	Mike Smith (CAN)	8160 pts	Abdennacer Moumen (MAR)	7330 pts	Richard Hesketh (CAN)	7297 pts

=== Women ===
Event	Gold		Silver		Bronze	
100 metres	Laurence Bily (FRA)	11.14	Patricia Girard (FRA)	11.25	Lalao Ravaonirina (MAD)	11.35
200 metres	Marie-José Pérec (FRA)	22.60	Lalao Ravaonirina (MAD)	23.26	Odile Singa (FRA)	23.47
400 metres	Jillian Richardson (CAN)	51.79	Charmaine Crooks (CAN)	52.02	Néné Tandian (SEN)	52.08
800 metres	Brit Lind-Petersen (CAN)	2:05.03	Renée Belanger (CAN)	2:05.24	Fatima Maama (MAR)	2:05.41
1500 metres	Fatima Aouam (MAR)	4:11.15	Robyn Meagher (CAN)	4:13.71	Paula Schnurr (CAN)	4:16.12
3000 metres	Fatima Aouam (MAR)	9:06.70	Marcianne Mukamurenzi (RWA)	9:10.71	Alison Wiley (CAN)	9:10.76
10,000 metres	Marcianne Mukamurenzi (RWA)	34:18.84	Hassania Darami (MAR)	34:20.75	Odile Ohier (FRA)	34:31.72
Marathon	Rakiya Maraoui (MAR)	2:47:01	Cindy New (Quebec)	2:47:38	Maryse Justin (MRI)	2:54:50
100 metres hurdles	Monique Éwanjé-Épée (FRA)	12.92	Anne Piquereau (FRA)	12.99	Christine Hurtlin (FRA)	13.24
400 metres hurdles	Hélène Huart (FRA)	56.92	Corinne Pierre-Joseph (FRA)	57.10	Marie Womplou (CIV)	57.78
4×100 metres relay	France (FRA); Laurence Bily; Patricia Girard; Françoise Leroux; Marie-Christine Dubois	43.38	Canada (CAN); Faye Roberts; Esmie Lawrence; France Gareau; Jillian Richardson	45.04	Belgium (BEL)	45.24
4×400 metres relay	France (FRA); Ketty Régent-Talbot; Évelyne Élien; Corinne Pierre-Joseph; Hélène Huart	3:31.89	Canada (CAN); Rosey Edeh; France Gareau; Jeanette Woods; Charmaine Crooks	3:32.96	Ivory Coast (CIV); Alimata Koné; Louise Koré; Marie Womplou; Célestine N'Drin	3:37.58
High jump	Maryse Éwanjé-Épée (FRA)	1.88	Linda Cameron (CAN)	1.86	Leslie Estwick (CAN); Beatrice Landes (FRA)	1.81
Long jump	Florence Colle (FRA)	6.56	Géraldine Bonnin (FRA)	6.25	Françoise Cochard (FRA)	6.23
Shot put	Léone Bertimon (FRA)	15.70	Martine Jean-Michel (FRA)	15.42	Brigitte De Leeuw (BEL)	15.18
Discus throw	Agnès Teppe (FRA)	54.94	Catherine Beauvais (FRA)	52.40	Hanan Ahmed Khaled (EGY)	50.60
Javelin	Lorri LaRowe (CAN)	55.14	Christine Gravier (FRA)	53.12	Faye Roblin (CAN)	51.82
Heptathlon	Donna Smellie (CAN)	5622 pts	Catherine Bond (CAN)	5588 pts	Hélène Bossé (FRA)	5448 pts

== Medal table ==
* Host nation (Morocco)

Rank	Nation	Gold	Silver	Bronze	Total
1	France (FRA)	20	21	17	58
2	Canada (CAN)	8	11	9	28
3	Morocco (MAR)*	6	5	3	14
4	Senegal (SEN)	3	0	3	6
5	Djibouti (DJI)	1	1	1	3
5	Madagascar (MAD)	1	1	1	3
7	Rwanda (RWA)	1	1	0	2
8	Ivory Coast (CIV)	1	0	3	4
9	Quebec (QUE)	0	1	0	1
10	Belgium (BEL)	0	0	2	2
10	Mauritius (MRI)	0	0	2	2
12	Egypt (EGY)	0	0	1	1
Totals (12 entries)		41	41	42	124
