= Jean Randriamamitiana =

Malagasy sprinter

Personal information
- Nationality: Malagasy
- Born: Jean-Jacky Randriamamitiana; 19 June 1973 (age 53)
- Height: 175 cm (5 ft 9 in)
- Weight: 75 kg (165 lb)

Sport
- Sport: Sprinting
- Events: 100 metres 400 metres

Jean-Jacky Randriamamitiana (born 19 June 1973) is a Malagasy former sprinter being active during the 1990s and 2000s.

Representing his country at international competitions he reached the semi-finals in the 100 metres at the 1994 Jeux de la Francophonie in Bondoufle, France. At the 1997 Jeux de la Francophonie in Antananarivo, Madagascar, he set the Malagasy records in the 4 × 400 metres relay with a time of 3:08.0 that is still the national record as of 2025. He competed in the men's 100 metres at the 2000 Summer Olympics.

Randriamamitiana was the reigning Malagasy 100 m champion in 2002. In 2005, Randriamamitiana was studying to earn a Brevet d'État d'éducateur sportif certificate. He won the 200 m at the 2005 Réunion athletics championships.
