= Franck Waota =

Ivorian sprinter (born 1971)

Personal information
- Born: 6 December 1971 (age 54) Abidjan, Ivory Coast

Sport
- Sport: Track and field

Frank Waota (born 6 December 1971) is a former track and field sprinter from Ivory Coast who specialized in the 200 metres. He represented his country at the Summer Olympics in 1992 and 1996, and ran at the World Championships in Athletics in 1993. He was a finalist in the 4 × 100 metres relay with the Ivory Coast men's relay team at the 1992 Summer Olympics and the 1993 World Championships in Athletics. He holds personal bests of 6.65 seconds for the 60 metres, 10.28 seconds for the 100 metres and 20.68 seconds for the 200 m.

Waota finished seventh in 4 × 100 metres relay at the 1993 World Championships, together with teammates Ouattara Lagazane, Jean-Olivier Zirignon and Ibrahim Meité. The same quartet won a silver medal at the 1994 Jeux de la Francophonie. He was the 200 m winner at the West and North African Athletics Championships in 1995.

Participating in the 200 m at the 1996 Summer Olympics, he was knocked out in the quarter-finals. He finished in second place in the 200 m at the French Athletics Championships that year.

== International competitions ==
Year	Competition	Venue	Position	Event	Notes
1991	Universiade	Sheffield, United Kingdom	4th	4 × 100 m relay	40.14
1992	Olympic Games	Barcelona, Spain	8th	4 × 100 m relay	39.31
1993	World Championships	Stuttgart, Germany	7th	4 × 100 m relay	38.82
1994	Jeux de la Francophonie	Bondoufle, France	8th	100 m	10.54
1994	Jeux de la Francophonie	Bondoufle, France	2nd	4 × 100 m relay	39.38
1995	West and North African Championships	Dakar, Senegal	1st	100 m	10.35
1996	Olympic Games	Atlanta, United States	8th (qf3)	200 m	21.14
1996	Olympic Games	Atlanta, United States	7th (sf1)	4 × 100 m relay	38.99

== National titles ==
- French Indoor Athletics Championships
  - 60 metres: 1994

== See also ==
- List of Ivoirians
