= Teppe =

Teppe is a surname. Notable people with the surname include:

- Agnès Teppe (born 1968), French athlete, specialised in the discus throw
- Nathalie Teppe (born 1972), French heptathlete
