= Lizanne Bussières =

Canadian long-distance runner

Personal information
- Born: August 20, 1961 (age 64) Sainte-Foy, Quebec, Canada

Sport
- Sport: Marathon running
Medal record
Representing Canada
Commonwealth Games
| Silver medal – second place | 1994 Victoria | Marathon |
Summer Universiade
| Bronze medal – third place | 1989 Duisburg | 10,000m |

Lizanne Bussières (born August 20, 1961) is a Canadian former long-distance runner, who competed in the women's marathon at two consecutive Summer Olympics for her native country, starting in 1988. She won the silver medal at the 1994 Commonwealth Games.

== Achievements ==
| Year | Competition | Venue | Position | Event | Notes |
Representing Canada
| 1986 | Commonwealth Games | Edinburgh, United Kingdom | 4th | Marathon | 2:35:18 |
| 1988 | Olympic Games | Seoul, South Korea | 26th | Marathon | 2:35:03 |
| 1990 | Commonwealth Games | Auckland, New Zealand | 9th | 3000 m | 9:04.59 |
| 1992 | Olympic Games | Barcelona, Spain | — | Marathon | DNF |
| 1993 | Pittsburgh Marathon | Pittsburgh, United States | 1st | Marathon | 2:35:39 |
| 1994 | Jeux de la Francophonie | Paris, France | 2nd | 10,000 m | 34:08.64 |
| 1994 | Commonwealth Games | Victoria, British Columbia, Canada | 2nd | Marathon | 2:31:07 |
