= Valérie Nadaud =

French racewalker

Valérie Lévêque-Nadaud (born 16 March 1968 in Soyaux, Charente) is a retired female race walker from France.

== Achievements ==
Year	Competition	Venue	Position	Event	Notes
Representing France
1994	European Championships	Helsinki, Finland	18th	10 km	46:23
1994	Jeux de la Francophonie	Paris, France	2nd	10,000 m	46:01.77
1996	Olympic Games	Atlanta, United States	36th	10 km	47:49
1997	World Race Walking Cup	Poděbrady, Czech Republic	71st	10 km	48:13
