= Tahar Mansouri =

Tunisian marathon runner (born 1965)

Tahar Ben Hassine Mansouri (born 9 January 1965 in Fouchana, Tunis) is a retired Tunisian marathon runner.

== Achievements ==
Year	Competition	Venue	Position	Event	Notes
Representing Tunisia
1992	Pan Arab Games	Latakia, Syria	1st	Marathon	2:21:52
1993	Mediterranean Games	Narbonne, France	8th	Marathon	2:21:02
1993	World Championships	Stuttgart, Germany	9th	Marathon	2:18:54
1994	Jeux de la Francophonie	Paris, France	1st	Marathon	2:17:18
1995	World Championships	Gothenburg, Sweden	24th	Marathon	2:20:44
1996	Olympic Games	Atlanta, United States	26th	Marathon	2:18:06
1997	Pan Arab Games	Beirut, Lebanon	1st	Marathon	2:28:19
2000	Olympic Games	Sydney, Australia	38th	Marathon	2:20:33
