= Jean-Paul Gahimbaré =

Burundian long-distance runner

Personal information
- Nationality: Burundi
- Born: 22 December 1970 (age 55)
- Height: 1.74 m (5 ft 9 in)
- Weight: 57 kg (126 lb)

Sport
- Sport: Athletics
- Events: 50000 metres; 10000 metres; Marathon; Half marathon

Achievements and titles
- Olympic finals: 2004
- World finals: 1997, 2005
- Personal bests: Marathon: 2:14:38 (1996); Half marathon: 1:02:07 (1999); Half marathon: 1:02:07 (1999); 10000 metres: 30:15 (2003); 5000 metres: 14:25.8 (2003)

Jean-Paul Gahimbaré (born 22 December 1970) is a Burundian long-distance runner competing in the 5000m, 10000m, half-marathon and marathon races during the 1990s and 2000s.

One of his main victories was in 1996 winning the Lille Half Marathon in Lille, France.

In his early years he had two top-10 results at the 1994 Jeux de la Francophonie in the 5000 metres and 10000 metres. Later in the 1990s and in the 2000s he represented Burundi at multiple main international championships, including at the 1997 World Championships in Athletics (marathon event), at the 2004 Summer Olympics in the marathon and at the 2005 World Championships in Athletics (marathon event).
