= Maxime Charlemagne =

Saint Lucian sprinter

Maxime Charlemagne (born 27 September 1974) is an athlete from Saint Lucia.

He was part of the first ever team to represent Saint Lucia at the Olympic Games when he competed at the 1996 Summer Olympic Games in the 4 x 100 metres relay, the relay team finished fifth in their heat so he did not advance to the next round. He also competed in the 400 metres at the 1995 World Championships in Athletics, where he finished sixth in his heat and failed to advance to the next round.
