= Corinne Simasotchi =

Swiss sprinter

Personal information
- Nationality: Swiss
- Born: 11 June 1971 (age 54)

Sport
- Sport: Sprinting
- Event: 400 metres

Corinne Simasotchi (born 11 June 1971) is a Swiss sprinter. She competed in the women's 400 metres at the 1996 Summer Olympics.
