= Jean-Marc Tailhardat =

French pole vaulter

Jean-Marc Tailhardat (born 12 April 1966) is a retired French pole vaulter.

He finished fifteenth at the 1989 European Indoor Championships. He won the silver medal at the 1991 Mediterranean Games with a vault of 5.60 metres (18 ft 4 in), the same result as the winner, countryfellow Philippe d'Encausse. He won silver medals at the 1989 and 1994 Jeux de la Francophonie, and also became French indoor champion in 1989.

His personal best jump was 5.70 metres, achieved in June 1991 in Montgeron.
