= Marcelin Dally =

Medal record

Men's athletics

Representing Ivory Coast

African Championships
Silver medal – second place	1988 Annaba	110m hurdles

Marcelin Dally (born 13 August 1962) is a former Côte d'Ivoire hurdler. He graduated from the University of Paris Nanterre and holds an Engineer-Master in Management.

He won the silver medal at the 1988 African Championships and with the African team won the 1992 IAAF World Cup in Havana, Cuba, finishing sixth in the final on 110m hurdles. His personal best time was 13.86 seconds, achieved in July 1992 in Argentan, France. This is the national record of Côte d'Ivoire. He also holds the national record on 60m hurdles, 7.98, achieved in Nogent-sur-Oise, France, on 12 February 1994. He managed the reform of UNESCO's intergovernmental committee for sport, overseeing the Ministerial platform (MINEPS) and served in the field as Regional Adviser in sport policy for Africa.
