= Frédéric Kuhn =

French hammer thrower

Frédéric Kuhn (born 10 July 1968 in Gennevilliers, Hauts-de-Seine) is a retired male hammer thrower from France, who competed at the 1992 Summer Olympics in Barcelona, Spain. He set his personal best (76.80 metres) on 30 May 1992 at a meet in Angers.

== Achievements ==
Year	Competition	Venue	Position	Notes
Representing France
1986	World Junior Championships	Athens, Greece	9th	62.00 m
1987	European Junior Championships	Birmingham, United Kingdom	4th	68.22 m
1989	Jeux de la Francophonie	Casablanca, Morocco	3rd	72.12 m
1990	European Championships	Split, FR Yugoslavia	18th	71.30 m
1992	Olympic Games	Barcelona, Spain	18th	71.76 m
1994	Jeux de la Francophonie	Paris-Évry, France	2nd	72.20 m
1994	European Championships	Helsinki, Finland	15th	73.30 m
