= Hassan Ouhrouch =

Moroccan athlete

Hassan Ouhrouch (born 2 June 1964) is a retired Moroccan runner who saw success on continental level.

He won the gold medal in the 1500 metres at the 1989 Jeux de la Francophonie and finished fifth at the 1989 African Championships. He won the silver medal in the 3000 metres steeplechase at the 1989 Arab Championshipsand the 1990 Maghreb Championships. He became Moroccan champion in the steeplechase in 1988 and 1990, and also in the 5000 metres in 1985.

His personal best steeplechase time was 8:29.63 minutes, achieved in July 1990 in London.
