= Sheridon Baptiste =

Canadian bobsledder (born 1964)

Personal information
- Nationality: Canadian
- Born: 6 January 1964 (age 62) Georgetown, British Guiana

Sport
- Sport: Bobsleigh, Sprinting, Canadian football

Sheridon Baptiste (born 6 January 1964) is a Canadian former bobsledder, sprinter and Canadian football player. He competed at the 1992 Winter Olympics and the 1994 Winter Olympics in bobsleigh. As a sprinter, he won a gold medal in the 4 x 100 metres relay at the 1994 Jeux de la Francophonie for Canada. After playing Canadian football for Queen's University, Baptiste was selected by the Ottawa Rough Riders in the 4th round of the 1988 CFL draft but never played professionally.
