= Bruno Potanah =

Mauritian sprinter

Personal information
- Nationality: Mauritian
- Born: 2 June 1967 (age 59)

Sport
- Sport: Sprinting
- Event: 4 × 100 metres relay

Bruno Potanah (born 2 June 1967) is a Mauritian sprinter. He competed in the men's 4 × 100 metres relay at the 1996 Summer Olympics.
