= 2027 Jeux de la Francophonie =

International sports competition

X Jeux de la Francophonie
- Logo
- Host city: Yerevan, Armenia
- Nations: 55 (expected)
- Athletes: 4,000 (expected)
- Opening: 23 July
- Closing: 1 August
- Main venue: Hrazdan Stadium
- Website: https://www.jeux.francophonie.org/erevan-2027

The 2027 Jeux de la Francophonie (Armenian: 2027 Ֆրանկոֆոնիայի խաղեր), also known as Xes Jeux de la Francophonie (French for 10th Francophone Games), informally Yerevan 2027 (Erevan 2027; Երեւան 2027թ), is a planned edition of the Jeux de la Francophonie to be held in Yerevan, Armenia in 2027.

== Host selection ==
=== Candidate cities ===
- Yerevan, Armenia - Armenia formally submitted a bid for the 2027 Jeux de la Francophonie at the 44th meeting of the Organisation internationale de la Francophonie (OIF) Ministerial Conference in Yaoundé, Cameroon in November 2023. A delegation from the OIF visited Yerevan later that month to discuss issues related to Armenia's bid and concluded that Armenia's sporting infrastructure was well developed for hosting a successful games. Yerevan was formally awarded the games at the 126th session of the Permanent Council of the OIF on 8 February 2024.

=== Votes results ===
2027 Jeux de la Francophonie
City	Nation	Votes
Yerevan	Armenia	Unanimous

== Venues ==
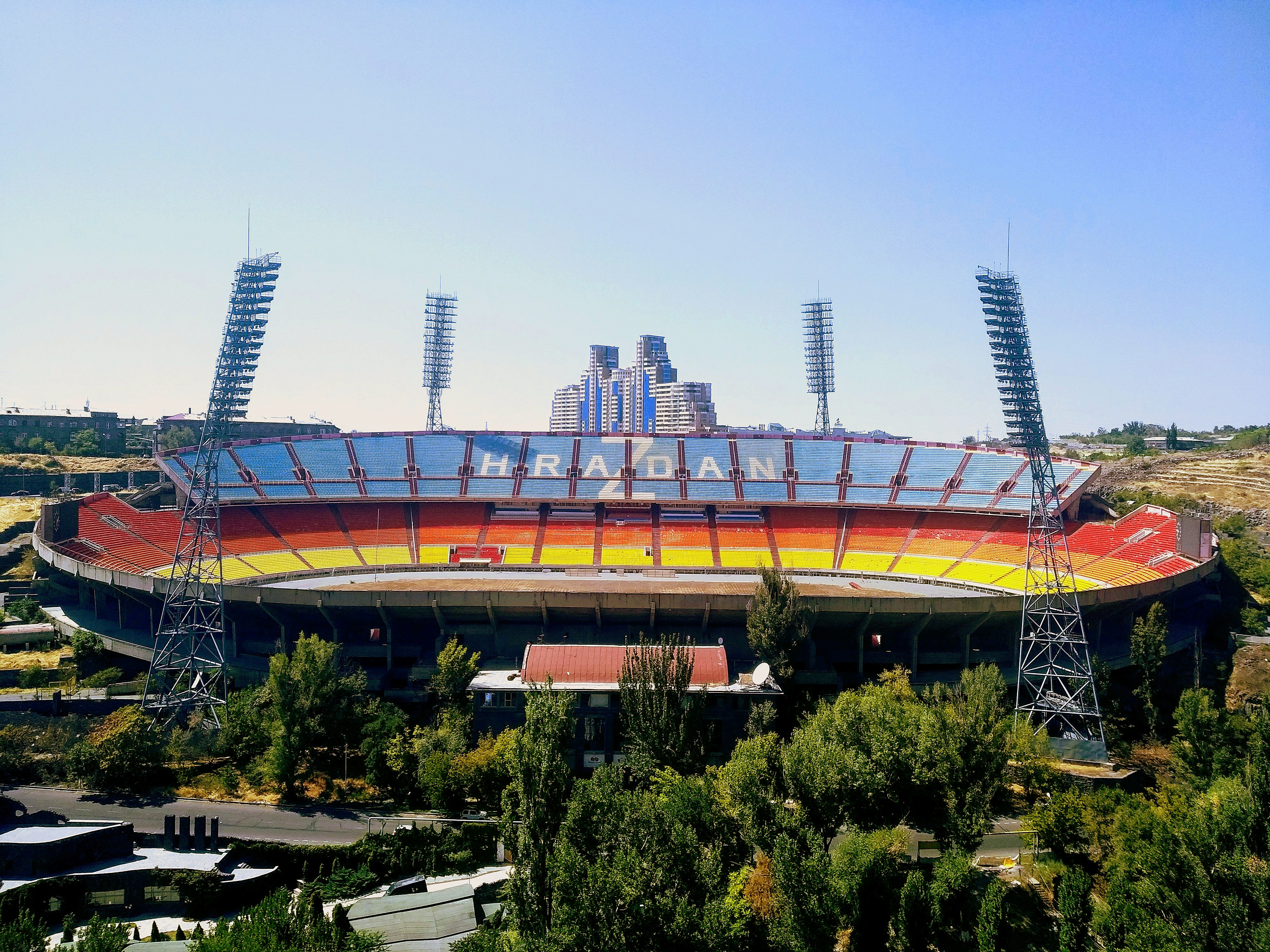
Hrazdan Stadium

Venues expected to host events include:

- Hrazdan Stadium
- Karen Demirchyan Complex
- V. Tumasyan Stadium in Abovyan
- Gazprom Armenia Educational and Sports Complex

Work on an athlete's village is expected to start in 2024.

== Events ==
=== Sports ===
- Athletics
- Basketball
- Breakdancing
- Chess
- Football (soccer)
- Judo
- Table tennis
- Weightlifting

=== Cultural ===
- Song
- Digital creation
- Tales and storytellers
- Creative dance
- Ball juggling (Freestyle ball)
- Literature/Short Story
- Paint
- Photography
- Sculpture/Installation
- Theater

== Participants ==
Member states or governments of the Organisation internationale de la Francophonie are eligible to send teams.

Participating members
- Armenia (Host)
