= Sandrine Domain =

French triple jumper

Personal information
- Nationality: France
- Born: 6 September 1971 (age 54) Strasbourg

Sport
- Event: Triple Jump

Sandrine Domain (born 6 September 1971 at Strasbourg) is a former French athlete, who specialized in the triple jump.

== Biography ==
She won two French National Championship titles in the triple jump in 1991 and 2000.

She twice improved the French triple jump record, jumping 13.42 m on 26 July 1991 at Dijon during the French Athletic Championships, and also jumping 14.15 m on 14 July 1996 at La Roche-sur-Yon.

=== Prize list ===
- French Championships in Athletics :
  - winner of the triple jump 1991 and 2000

=== Records ===
personal records
Event	Performance	Location	Date
Triple jump	14.15 m	La Roche-sur-Yon	14 July 1996

== Notes and references ==
- Docathlé2003, Fédération française d'athlétisme, 2003, p. 400
