= Patricia Foufoué Ziga =

Ivorian sprinter

Medal record

Women's athletics

Representing Ivory Coast

African Championships
Silver medal – second place	1988 Annaba	4×100 m
Bronze medal – third place	1985 Cairo	4×100 m

Patricia Foufoué Ziga (born 8 March 1972) is a retired Côte d'Ivoire sprinter who specialized in the 100 metres.

She competed in the 100 metres of the 1992 Olympics, but did not advance beyond the heats.

She finished sixth in the 60 metres at the 1993 World Indoor Championships. She had competed at the 1991 edition, but did not reach the final then.

Her personal best time was 11.48 seconds, achieved in July 1990 in Montgeron.
