= Jean-Olivier Brosseau =

French race walker

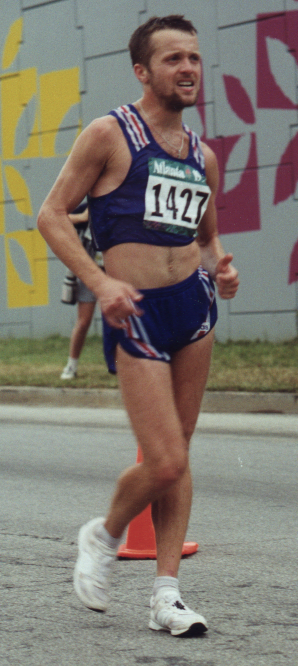
Jean-Olivier Brosseau

Jean-Olivier Brosseau (born 23 June 1967 in Bressuire, Deux-Sèvres, is a retired male race walker from France, who was affiliated with Sèvre Bocage AC during his career. He specialised in the 20 km distance and was selected for the World Championships in Athletics three times from 1993 to 1997. He competed at one Olympic Games – the 1996 Summer Olympics, where he was 35th in the men's 20 km walk.

== Achievements ==
Year	Competition	Venue	Position	Event	Notes
Representing France
1989	World Race Walking Cup	L'Hospitalet, Spain	84th	20 km	1:33:42
1991	World Race Walking Cup	San Jose, California, United States	32nd	50 km	4:08:59
1993	World Race Walking Cup	Monterrey, Mexico	28th	20 km	1:29:20
1993	World Championships	Stuttgart, Germany	16th	20 km	1:25:53
1995	World Race Walking Cup	Beijing, PR China	20th	20 km	1:23:38
1995	World Championships	Gothenburg, Sweden	10th	20 km	1:23:34
1996	Olympic Games	Atlanta, United States	35th	20 km	1:26:29
1997	World Race Walking Cup	Poděbrady, Czech Republic	38th	20 km	1:22:04
1997	World Championships	Athens, Greece	25th	20 km	1:26:39
