= Seynou Loum =

Senegalese sprinter

Personal information
- Nationality: Senegalese
- Born: 3 January 1972 (age 54)

Sport
- Sport: Sprinting
- Event: 4 × 100 metres relay
Medal record
Men's athletics
Representing Senegal
African Championships
Silver medal – second place	1992 Belle Vue Harel	4×100 m

Seynou Loum (born 3 January 1972) is a Senegalese sprinter. He competed in the men's 4 × 100 metres relay at the 1992 Summer Olympics.
