= Anthony Wilson (sprinter) =

Canadian sprinter (born 1968)

Personal information
- Nationality: Canadian
- Born: 13 December 1968 (age 57) Lucea, Jamaica
- Height: 176 cm (5 ft 9 in)
- Weight: 73 kg (161 lb)

Sport
- Sport: Sprinting
- Event: 200 metres

Anthony Wilson (born December 13, 1968) is a Canadian sprinter. He competed in the men's 200 metres and the men's 4 × 100 metres relay at the 1992 Summer Olympics.

Wilson competed for the Northern Arizona Lumberjacks track and field team in the NCAA. He set a Big Sky Conference record in the 200 m.
