= Ouattara Lagazane =

Ivorian sprinter

Personal information
- Born: 1 January 1963 (age 63) Bondoukou, Ivory Coast

Sport
- Sport: Track and field
Medal record
Representing Ivory Coast
African Championships
Bronze medal – third place	1990 Cairo	4×100 m

Ouattara Lagazane (born 1 January 1963) is an Ivorian sprinter who specialized in the 200 metres.

Lagazane finished seventh in 4 x 100 metres relay at the 1993 World Championships, together with teammates Ibrahim Meité, Jean-Olivier Zirignon and Frank Waota.

Participating in the 1992 Summer Olympics, he was knocked out in the quarterfinals.
