= 2013 Jeux de la Francophonie =

International sports competition in Nice, France

VIIèmes Jeux de la Francophonie
- Host city: Nice, France
- Nations: 54
- Athletes: 2,700
- Opening: September 6, 2013
- Closing: September 15, 2013
- Opened by: François Hollande
- Main venue: Place Masséna/Stade Charles-Ehrmann

The 2013 Jeux de la Francophonie, also known as VIIèmes Jeux de la Francophonie (French for 7th Francophone Games), were held in Nice, France, from September 6–15. This was the second edition of the games to be hosted in France and the first time that a country hosted the games twice.

== Participants ==
The list below is not complete. You can help by expanding it.

- Andorra
- Armenia
- Austria
- Benin
- Bulgaria
- Burkina Faso
- Burundi
- Cambodia
- Cameroon
- Canada
- Cape Verde
- Central African Republic
- Chad
- Comoros
- Congo
- Côte d'Ivoire
- Cyprus
- Djibouti
- DR Congo
- Egypt
- Estonia
- Equatorial Guinea
- France
- Gabon
- Guinea
- Guinea-Bissau
- Haiti
- Japan
- Lebanon
- Luxembourg
- Macedonia
- Madagascar
- Mali
- Mauritania
- Mauritius
- Monaco
- Montenegro
- Morocco
- New Brunswick
- Niger
- Poland
- Qatar
- Quebec
- Romania
- Rwanda
- Saint Lucia
- Senegal
- Seychelles
- Slovakia
- Switzerland
- Togo
- Tunisia
- Uruguay
- Vanuatu
- Vietnam
- Wallonia

== Events ==
=== Sports ===
- African wrestling
- Athletics
- Athletics (handicapped)
- Basketball
- Cycling
- Boxing
- Football (soccer)
- Judo
- Table tennis
- Wrestling

Ref

=== Cultural ===
- Digital creation
- Ecological creation
- Hip-hop dance
- Juggling
- Poetry
- Painting
- Photography
- Puppetry
- Sculpture
- Song
- Storytelling
- Traditional inspiration dance

== Medal table ==
* Host nation (France)

Rank	Nation	Gold	Silver	Bronze	Total
1	France (FRA)*	23	23	12	58
2	Canada (CAN)	15	14	16	45
3	Poland (POL)	10	4	13	27
4	Romania (ROU)	9	10	4	23
5	Morocco (MAR)	7	10	6	23
6	Senegal (SEN)	6	5	8	19
7	Wallonia	5	5	6	16
8	Chad (CHA)	4	2	4	10
9	Ivory Coast (CIV)	4	0	2	6
10	Cameroon (CMR)	3	7	7	17
11	Lebanon (LIB)	3	1	0	4
12	Armenia (ARM)	3	0	3	6
13	Switzerland (SUI)	2	2	3	7
14	Congo (CGO)	2	1	1	4
15	Quebec	1	5	5	11
16	Tunisia (TUN)	1	3	6	10
17	Qatar (QAT)	1	1	6	8
18	Burundi (BDI)	1	1	0	2
18	Seychelles (SEY)	1	1	0	2
20	Djibouti (DJI)	1	0	1	2
20	Haiti (HAI)	1	0	1	2
22	Niger (NIG)	0	5	4	9
23	New Brunswick	0	1	5	6
24	Burkina Faso (BUR)	0	1	2	3
25	Benin (BEN)	0	1	1	2
25	Montenegro (MNE)	0	1	1	2
27	Slovakia (SVK)	0	1	0	1
28	Mauritius (MRI)	0	0	4	4
29	Cambodia (CAM)	0	0	2	2
29	Rwanda (RWA)	0	0	2	2
31	Gabon (GAB)	0	0	1	1
31	Luxembourg (LUX)	0	0	1	1
31	Uruguay (URU)	0	0	1	1
Totals (33 entries)		103	105	128	336
