= Hermann Lomba =

French sprinter

Medal record

Men's athletics

Representing France

European Championships
Gold medal – first place	1994 Helsinki	4×100 m

Hermann Lomba (born 11 October 1960 in Pointe-a-Pitre, Guadeloupe) is a retired French athlete who specialised in the 200 meters. He competed at the 1991 World Championships in Athletics.
