= Agnès Teppe =

French discus thrower

Personal information
- Born: 4 May 1968 (age 58) Bourg-en-Bresse, France
- Height: 181 cm (5 ft 11 in)
- Weight: 80 kg (176 lb)

Sport
- Country: France
- Sport: Athletics
- Event: Discus throw
Medal record
Mediterranean Games
Bronze medal – third place	1991 Athens	Discus throw
Jeux de la Francophonie
Gold medal – first place	1989 Rabat	Discus throw
Silver medal – second place	2005 Niamey	Discus throw

Agnès Teppe (born 4 May 1968 in Bourg-en-Bresse) is a French former athlete, who specialised in the discus throw.

She won two French national championship titles in the discus: in 1990 and 1994. She twice improved the French discus record throwing 59.16 m (194 ft 1 in) in 1991 and 60.14 m (197 ft 3 1/2 in) in 1992.

Bronze medalist at the 1991 Mediterranean Games, in Athens, she won the 1989 Games of La Francophonie and obtained the silver medal in those games in 2005.

She is the older sister of Nathalie Teppe, a specialist in the heptathlon.

== National titles ==
- French Championships in Athletics :
  - 2 times winner of the Discus Throw: 1990 and 1994

== Personal records ==
Event	Performance	Location	Date
Discus throw	60.14 m	fr:Luminy, France	1992
