= Lalao Ravaonirina =

Malagasy sprinter

Medal record

Women's athletics

Representing Madagascar

African Championships
Silver medal – second place	1993 Durban	4×100 m
Silver medal – second place	1998 Dakar	4×100 m
Bronze medal – third place	1988 Annaba	100 m
Bronze medal – third place	1989 Lagos	200 m
Bronze medal – third place	1992 Belle Vue Harel	4×100 m

Lalao Ravaonirina (born 8 November 1963) is a retired Malagasy athlete who specialized in the 100 and 200 metres. She competed in the women's 100 metres at the 1992 Summer Olympics.

Her personal best time was 11.32 seconds, achieved in July 1991 in Limoges. This is the current Malagasy record, held jointly with Hanitriniaina Rakotondrabe.

== Achievements ==
- 1997 Jeux de la Francophonie - bronze medal (100 m)
- 1994 Jeux de la Francophonie - bronze medal (100 m)
- 1989 Jeux de la Francophonie - bronze medal (100 m), silver medal (200 m)
- 1989 African Championships - bronze medal (200 m)
- 1988 African Championships - bronze medal (100 m)
