= 1989 Jeux de la Francophonie =

International sports competition in Morocco

Ièrs Jeux de la Francophonie
- Host city: Casablanca and Rabat, Morocco
- Nations: 39
- Athletes: 1,700
- Opening: 8 July
- Closing: 22 July
- Opened by: Hassan II
- Main venue: Stade Mohamed V (ceremonies); Prince Moulay Abdellah Stadium (athletics)

The 1989 Jeux de la Francophonie (Arabic: الألعاب الفرانكوفونية 1989), also known as I^{ers} Jeux de la Francophonie, (French for Francophone Games) were held in Casablanca and Rabat, Morocco, from 8 to 22 July 1989.

== Sports ==
Sport	Gender	Results
Athletics (Track and field)	men + women	details
Basketball	women	
Football (soccer)	men	details
Judo	men + women	

== Medals & Participation ==
=== Total ===
* Host nation (Morocco)

Rank	Nation	Gold	Silver	Bronze	Total
1	France (FRA)	34	25	18	77
2	Canada (CAN)	9	15	20	44
3	Morocco (MAR)*	7	8	6	21
4	Senegal (SEN)	3	3	4	10
5	Quebec	2	4	8	14
6	(Wallonia) French Community of Belgium	2	1	5	8
7	Djibouti (DJI)	1	1	1	3
7	Egypt (EGY)	1	1	1	3
7	Madagascar (MDG)	1	1	1	3
7	Rwanda (RWA)	1	1	1	3
11	Ivory Coast (CIV)	1	0	3	4
12	Congo (COG)	1	0	1	2
12	Switzerland (SUI)	1	0	1	2
14	Togo (TOG)	1	0	0	1
15	Tunisia (TUN)	0	2	2	4
16	Gabon (GAB)	0	1	2	3
17	Luxembourg (LUX)	0	1	1	2
17	New Brunswick	0	1	1	2
19	Mauritius (MUS)	0	0	2	2
20	Burkina Faso (BFA)	0	0	1	1
20	Mali (MLI)	0	0	1	1
Totals (21 entries)		65	65	80	210

The following participating nations didn't win any medal.

Benin Burundi Cameroon Central African Republic Chad Comoros	Democratic Republic of the Congo Dominica Guinea Guinea-Bissau Lebanon	Monaco Niger Saint Lucia Seychelles Vietnam
