= Marie Womplou =

Ivorian athlete (born 1969)

Personal information
- Nationality: Ivorian
- Born: 20 December 1969 (age 56)

Sport
- Sport: Track and field
- Event: 400 metres hurdles
Medal record
Women's athletics
Representing Ivory Coast
African Championships
Silver medal – second place	1988 Annaba	4×100 m
Silver medal – second place	1988 Annaba	4×400 m
Silver medal – second place	1989 Lagos	400 m hurdles
Bronze medal – third place	1985 Cairo	400 m hurdles
Bronze medal – third place	1988 Annaba	400 m hurdles

Marie Womplou (born 20 December 1969) is an Ivorian hurdler. She competed in the women's 400 metres hurdles at the 1988 Summer Olympics.
