= Alimata Koné =

Ivorian sprinter

Personal information
- Nationality: Ivorian
- Born: 22 January 1965 (age 61)

Sport
- Sport: Sprinting
- Event: 400 metres
Medal record
Women's athletics
Representing Ivory Coast
African Championships
| Silver medal – second place | 1988 Annaba | 4×100 m |
| Silver medal – second place | 1988 Annaba | 4×400 m |
| Bronze medal – third place | 1996 Yaoundé | 400 m |

Alimata Koné (born 22 January 1965) is an Ivorian sprinter. She competed in the women's 400 metres at the 1992 Summer Olympics.
