= Jeux de la Francophonie =

International sporting event

- Logo of the Games
- Status: active
- Genre: sports event
- Frequency: every 4th year
- Location: various
- Inaugurated: 1989
- Website: www.jeux.francophonie.org

The Jeux de la Francophonie (Canadian English: Francophonie Games; British English: Francophone Games) are a combination of artistic and sporting events for the Francophonie, mostly French-speaking nations and former colonies of France, held every four years since 1989.

== Editions ==
Year	Edition	Opened by	Date	Host city	No. of Athletes (nations)
1989	I	Hassan II	8–22 July	Casablanca & Rabat, Morocco	1,700 (39)
1994	II	François Mitterrand	5–13 July	Paris, Évry & Bondoufle, France	2,700 (45)
1997	III	Didier Ratsiraka	27 August – 6 September	Antananarivo, Madagascar	2,300 (38)
2001	IV	Adrienne Clarkson	14–24 July	Ottawa–Gatineau, Canada	2,400 (51)
2005	V	Mamadou Tandja	7–17 December	Niamey, Niger	2,500 (44)
2009	VI	Michel Suleiman	27 September – 6 October	Beirut, Lebanon	2,500 (40)
2013	VII	François Hollande	6–15 September	Nice, France	2,700 (54)
2017	VIII	Alassane Ouattara	21–30 July	Abidjan, Ivory Coast	4,000 (49)
2023	IX	Félix Tshisekedi	28 July – 6 August	Kinshasa, Democratic Republic of the Congo	3,000 (36)
2027	X	TBA	23 July – 1 August	Yerevan, Armenia	TBD
2031	XI	TBA	TBA	Dakar, Senegal	TBD

== Events ==
=== Sports ===
There were four sports at the inaugural event in 1989: athletics, basketball, association football and judo. Handisport, handball, table tennis and wrestling were added to the competition programme in 1994. None of these four sports featured at the 1997 Jeux de la Francophonie, and boxing and tennis were introduced to the programme instead. Eight sports featured in 2001: the four inaugural sports, boxing and table tennis were included. Furthermore, parasports and beach volleyball competitions were held. Neither of these sports were included in 2005, with traditional style wrestling being demonstrated in addition to the six more established sports. The 2009 programme re-introduced beach volleyball.

- Athletics : 1989, 1994, 1997, 2001, 2005, 2009, 2013, 2017, 2023
- Basketball : 1989, 1994, 1997, 2001, 2005, 2009, 2013, 2017, 2023
- Beach volleyball : 2001, 2009
- Boxing : 1997, 2001, 2005, 2009, 2013
- Cycling : 2013, 2023
- Road cycling (demonstration) : 2017
- Disabled sports : 2001, 2009, 2017, 2023
- Football : 1989, 1994, 1997, 2001, 2005, 2009, 2013, 2017, 2023
- Handball : 1994
- Judo : 1989, 1994, 1997, 2001, 2005, 2009, 2013, 2017, 2023
- Table tennis : 1994, 2001, 2005, 2009, 2013, 2017, 2023
- Tennis : 1997
- Wrestling : 1994, 2013, 2017, 2023
- Traditional African wrestling : 2005 (demonstration), 2013, 2017, 2023

=== Cultural ===
The Jeux de la Francophonie are distinctive, if not unique, among international multi-sport competitions for including competitive cultural performances and exhibitions, complete with gold, silver, and bronze medals for winning participants.

- Song
- Storytelling
- Traditional inspiration dance
- Poetry
- Painting
- Photography
- Sculpture

In 2001, street art was featured as a demonstration event.

== Medal table ==
An all-time Jeux de la Francophonie Medal Table from 1989 Jeux de la Francophonie to 2023 Jeux de la Francophonie, is tabulated below. The table is the sum of the medal tables of the various editions of the Jeux de la Francophonie.

Rank	Nation	Gold	Silver	Bronze	Total
1	France	219	163	132	514
2	Canada	92	80	126	298
3	Morocco	88	100	90	278
4	Romania	81	52	58	191
5	Senegal	39	41	47	127
6	Ivory Coast	27	28	26	81
7	Cameroon	26	35	54	115
8	(Quebec) Canada, Québec	24	32	55	111
9	Madagascar	22	18	28	68
10	Poland	20	8	20	48
11	Egypt	19	15	22	56
12	Tunisia	17	31	40	88
13	(Wallonia) French Community of Belgium	16	18	34	68
14	Mauritius	15	20	24	59
15	Burkina Faso	15	13	24	52
16	Switzerland	10	7	27	44
17	Congo	9	10	15	34
18	Lebanon	9	9	15	33
19	Armenia	7	7	9	23
20	DR Congo	6	11	21	38
21	Chad	6	8	6	20
22	Benin	6	3	7	16
23	Seychelles	6	3	3	12
24	Djibouti	6	2	7	15
25	Niger	5	19	15	39
26	Rwanda	5	2	4	11
27	Burundi	3	4	7	14
28	Guinea	3	3	1	7
29	Kosovo	3	2	1	6
30	Gabon	2	9	17	28
31	Canada New Brunswick	2	7	19	28
32	Togo	2	2	3	7
33	Cape Verde	2	2	2	6
34	Haiti	2	1	2	5
35	Mali	1	6	11	18
36	Lithuania	1	5	6	12
37	Vietnam	1	4	4	9
38	Qatar	1	1	6	8
39	Bulgaria	1	0	3	4
40	North Macedonia	1	0	1	2
41	Luxembourg	0	5	13	18
42	Central African Republic	0	1	6	7
43	Montenegro	0	1	1	2
44	Dominica	0	1	0	1
44	Guinea-Bissau	0	1	0	1
44	Slovakia	0	1	0	1
47	Cambodia	0	0	6	6
48	Equatorial Guinea	0	0	1	1
48	Saint Lucia	0	0	1	1
48	Uruguay	0	0	1	1
Totals (50 entries)		820	791	1,021	2,632

== Participation ==
The Jeux de la Francophonie are open to athletes and artists of the 53 member nations, 6 associate member nations and 25 observer nations and governments of the Organisation internationale de la Francophonie. Canada is represented by three teams: Quebec, New Brunswick (the only officially bilingual Canadian province), and a team representing the remainder of Canada. The Belgian team is restricted to athletes from the French-speaking areas of the country.

Participation has so far varied between 1,700 and 4,000 athletes and artists in the past 20 years.

=== 53 member nations or governments ===
- Albania
- Andorra
- Armenia
- Benin
- Bulgaria
- Burundi
- Cambodia
- Cameroon
- Canada
- Cape Verde
- Central African Republic
- Chad
- Comoros
- Cyprus
- Democratic Republic of the Congo
- Djibouti
- Dominica
- Egypt
- Equatorial Guinea
- France
- (Wallonia) French Community of Belgium
- Gabon
- Greece
- Ghana
- Guinea
- Guinea-Bissau
- Haiti
- Ivory Coast
- Laos
- Lebanon
- Lithuania
- Luxembourg
- New Brunswick
- North Macedonia
- Madagascar
- Mauritania
- Mauritius
- Moldova
- Monaco
- Morocco
- Poland
- (Quebec) Québec
- Republic of the Congo
- Romania
- Rwanda
- Saint Lucia
- São Tomé and Príncipe
- Senegal
- Seychelles
- Switzerland
- Togo
- Tunisia
- Vanuatu
- Vietnam

=== Five associate member nations ===
- Kosovo
- New Caledonia
- Qatar
- Serbia
- United Arab Emirates

=== Observer territories, nations, and provinces ===
- Angola
- Argentina
- Austria
- Bosnia and Herzegovina
- Chile
- Costa Rica
- Croatia
- Czech Republic
- Dominican Republic
- Estonia
- French Polynesia
- Gambia
- Georgia
- Hungary
- Ireland
- South Korea
- Latvia
- Lithuania
- Louisiana
- Malta
- Mexico
- Montenegro
- Mozambique
- Nova Scotia
- Ontario
- Poland
- Saarland
- Slovakia
- Slovenia
- Thailand
- Ukraine
- Uruguay
- Peru
- Tokelau
- Micronesia

== See also ==
- Commonwealth Games
- Lusophony Games
- Mediterranean Games
