= 1994 Jeux de la Francophonie =

International sports competition in Paris, France

IIèmes Jeux de la Francophonie
- Host city: Paris/Évry-Bondoufle, France
- Nations: 45
- Athletes: 2,700
- Opening: July 5, 1994
- Closing: July 13, 1994
- Opened by: François Mitterrand
- Main venue: Parc des Princes

The 1994 Jeux de la Francophonie, also known as II^{es} Jeux de la Francophonie, (French for Francophone Games) were held in Paris/Évry-Bondoufle, France from July 5–13, 1994.

== Sports ==
Sport	Gender	Results
Athletics (Track and field) include disabled athletics	men + women	details
Basketball	women	details
Football (soccer)	men	details
Handball	men + women	details
Judo	men + women	details
Table tennis	men + women	details
Wrestling	men	details

== Medals & Participation ==
Total

* Host nation (France)

Rank	Nation	Gold	Silver	Bronze	Total
1	France (FRA)*	28	28	24	80
2	Romania (ROU)	16	3	5	24
3	Canada (CAN)	14	10	15	39
4	Quebec	8	4	16	28
5	Morocco (MAR)	6	11	7	24
6	Tunisia (TUN)	4	7	1	12
7	Egypt (EGY)	2	5	4	11
8	Switzerland (SUI)	2	1	5	8
9	Senegal (SEN)	2	1	3	6
10	(Wallonia) French Community of Belgium	1	3	6	10
11	Madagascar (MAD)	1	2	3	6
12	Burkina Faso (BUR)	1	0	2	3
13	Togo (TOG)	1	0	1	2
14	Guinea (GUI)	1	0	0	1
14	Lebanon (LIB)	1	0	0	1
16	Ivory Coast (CIV)	0	3	3	6
17	Congo (CGO)	0	3	2	5
18	New Brunswick	0	1	2	3
19	Central African Republic (CAF)	0	1	0	1
19	Dominica (DMA)	0	1	0	1
19	Gabon (GAB)	0	1	0	1
19	Mali (MLI)	0	1	0	1
23	Cambodia (CAM)	0	0	2	2
23	Luxembourg (LUX)	0	0	2	2
23	Mauritius (MRI)	0	0	2	2
26	Burundi (BDI)	0	0	1	1
26	Djibouti (DJI)	0	0	1	1
26	Vietnam (VIE)	0	0	1	1
Totals (28 entries)		88	86	108	282

The following participation nations didn't win any medal.

Benin Bulgaria Cambodia Chad Comoros	Equatorial Guinea Guinea-Bissau Haiti Laos Mauritania	Monaco Niger Saint Lucia Seychelles
