= Bondoufle =

Commune in Île-de-France, France

- Commune
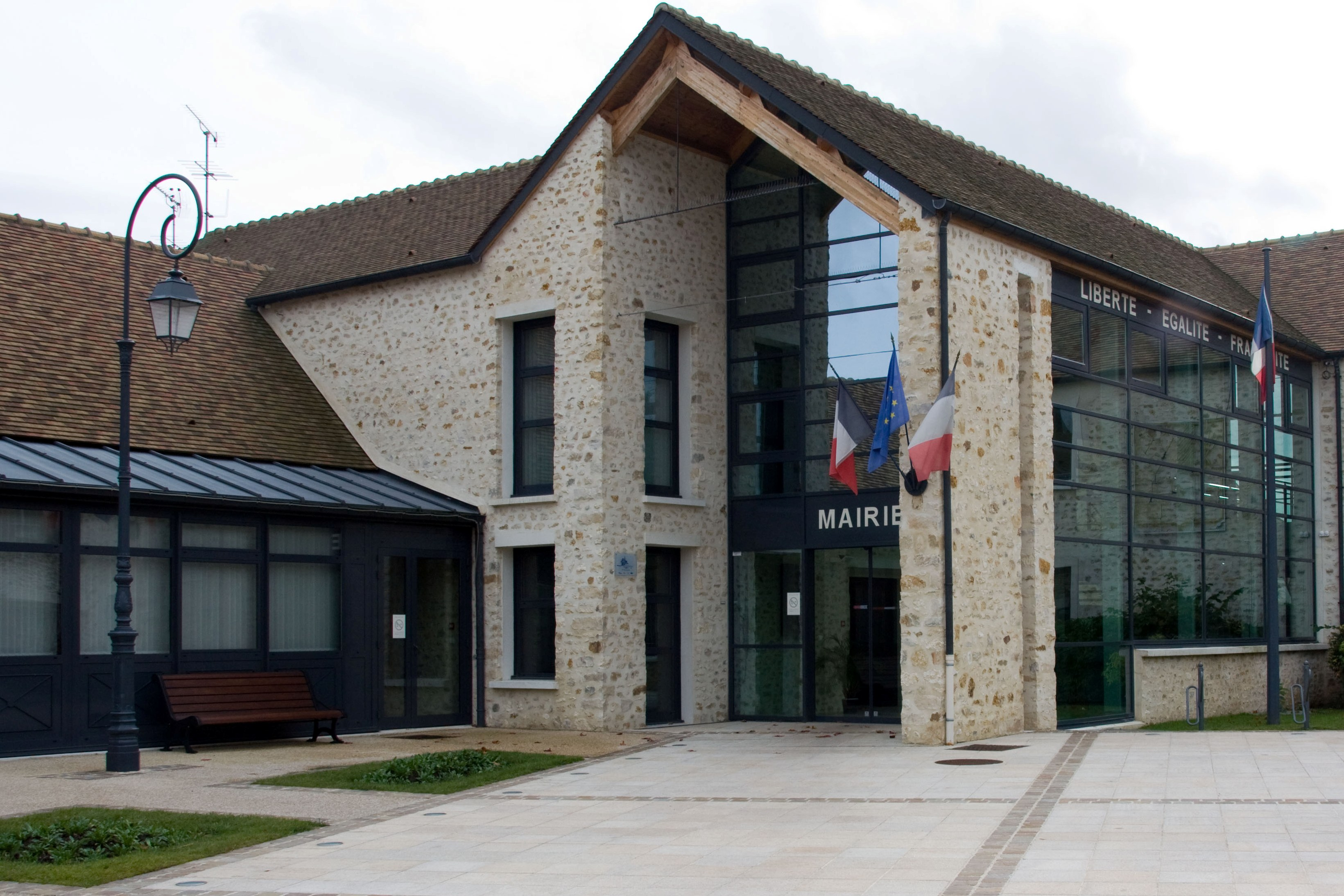
- The town hall

- Coat of arms
- Location of Bondoufle
- Location within France Location within Île-de-France (region)
- Coordinates: 48°36′52″N 2°22′51″E
- Country: France
- Region: Île-de-France
- Department: Essonne
- Arrondissement: Évry
- Canton: Ris-Orangis
- Intercommunality: CA Grand Paris Sud Seine-Essonne-Sénart

Government
  - Mayor (2020–2026): Jean Hartz
- Area^{1}: 6.76 km^{2} (2.61 sq mi)
- Highest elevation: 95 m (312 ft)
- Lowest elevation: 77 m (253 ft)
- Population (2023): 10,767
  - Density: 1,590/km^{2} (4,130/sq mi)
- Time zone: UTC+01:00 (CET)
  - Summer (DST): UTC+02:00 (CEST)
- INSEE/Postal code: 91086 /91070
- ^{1} French Land Register data, which excludes lakes, ponds, glaciers > 1 km^{2} (0.386 sq mi or 247 acres) and river estuaries.

Bondoufle (French pronunciation: [bɔ̃dufl]) is a commune in the Essonne department in Île-de-France in northern France. It is 27 km from Paris.

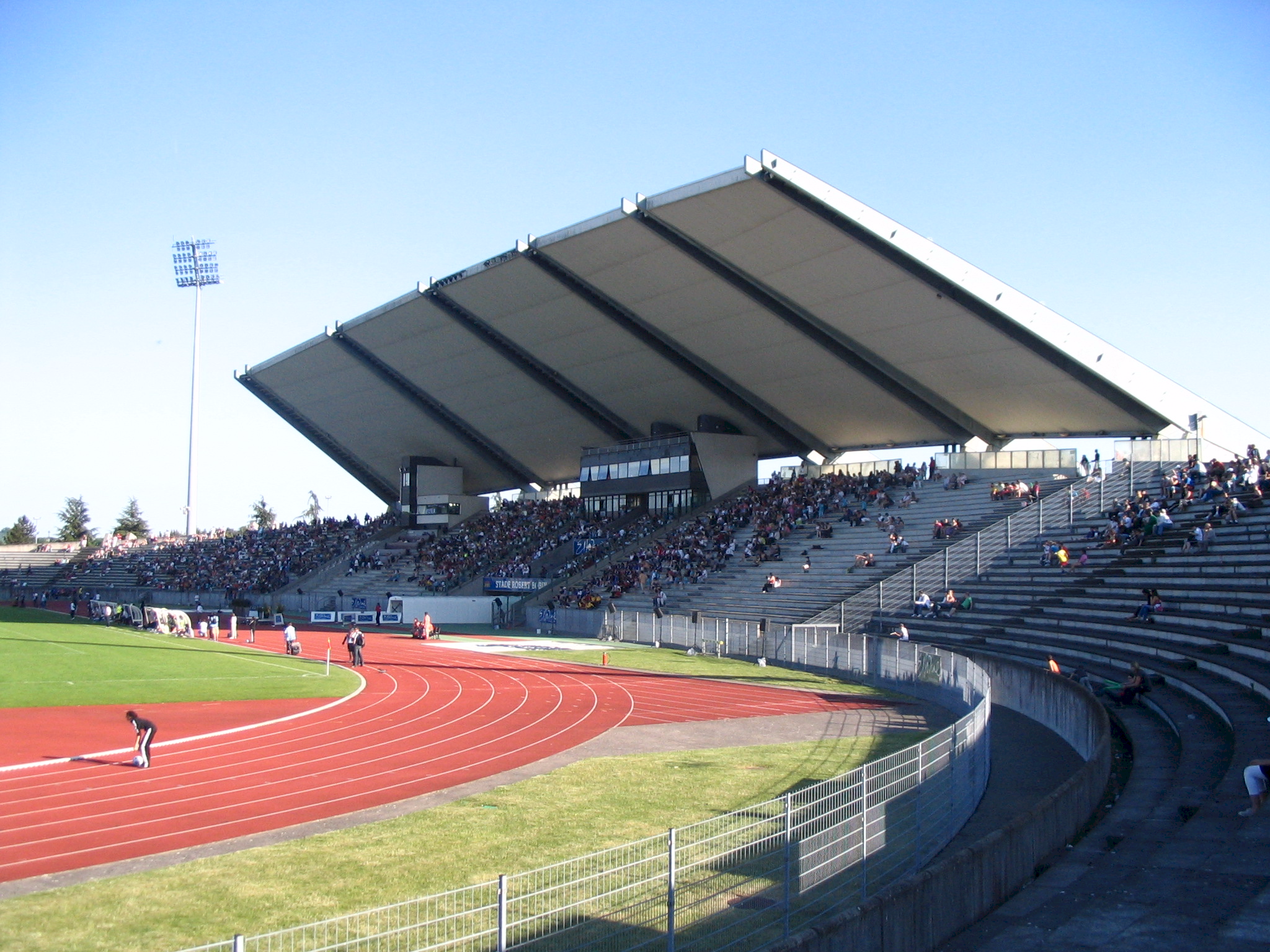
The Robert Bobin stadium.

In 1994 the city hosted the Francophonie Games at the Stade Robert Bobin, which had been built for the occasion.

== Population ==
Inhabitants of Bondoufle are known as Bondouflois in French.

Historical population
Year	Pop.	±% p.a.
1968	285	—
1975	2,097	+32.99%
1982	8,120	+21.34%
1990	7,719	−0.63%
1999	9,129	+1.88%
2007	9,451	+0.43%
2012	9,152	−0.64%
2017	9,538	+0.83%
2023	10,767	+2.04%
Source: INSEE

== Education ==
There are:

- Four preschools (école maternelle): Malraux, Mauriac, Mermoz, and Saint-Exupery
- Four elementary schools: Malraux, Mauriac, Mermoz, and Saint-Exupery
- Collège Charles Peguy (junior high school)
- Lycée François Truffaut (senior high school/sixth-form college)

== See also ==
- Communes of the Essonne department
