= Athletics at the 1994 Commonwealth Games – Men's 4 × 400 metres relay =

Men's 4 × 400 metres relay at the Commonwealth Games

The men's 4 × 400 metres relay event at the 1994 Commonwealth Games was held on 27 and 28 August at the Centennial Stadium in Victoria, British Columbia.

== Medalists ==
Gold	Silver	Bronze
England; David McKenzie; Peter Crampton; Adrian Patrick; Du'aine Ladejo; Alex Fugallo*; Mark Smith*	Jamaica; Orville Taylor; Dennis Blake; Linval Laird; Garth Robinson; Roxbert Martin*	Trinidad and Tobago; Patrick Delice; Neil de Silva; Hayden Stephen; Ian Morris

* Athletes who competed in heats only and received medals.

== Results ==
=== Heats ===
Rank	Heat	Nation	Athletes	Time	Notes
1	1	Trinidad and Tobago	Patrick Delice, Neil de Silva, Hayden Stephen, Ian Morris	3:02.97	Q
2	1	Kenya	Abednego Matilu, Gideon Biwott, Julius Chepkwony, Charles Gitonga	3:03.14	Q
3	1	Nigeria	Omokaro Alohan, Jude Monye, Emmanuel Okoli, Sunday Bada	3:03.48	Q
4	1	Wales	Peter Maitland, Jamie Baulch, Paul Gray, Iwan Thomas	3:03.68	q, NR
5	2	Jamaica	Orville Taylor, Dennis Blake, Linval Laird, Roxbert Martin	3:04.74	Q
6	2	Australia	Simon Hollingsworth, Michael Joubert, Brett Callaghan, Paul Greene	3:05.30	Q
7	2	England	Mark Smith, Alex Fugallo, Adrian Patrick, David McKenzie	3:07.12	Q
8	1	South Africa	Riaan Dempers, Arnaud Malherbe, Hermanus de Jager, Bobang Phiri	3:07.47	q
9	1	Zimbabwe	Arnold Payne, Savieri Ngidhi, Fabian Muyaba, Ken Harnden	3:07.50	
10	2	Canada	Rayton Archer, O'Brian Gibbons, William Best, Byron Goodwin	3:07.81	
11	2	Mauritius	Dominique Méyépa, Dario Clement, Judex Lefou, Désiré Pierre-Louis	3:11.48	
12	2	British Virgin Islands	Roger Mathavious, Steve Augustine, Mario Todman, Ralston Varlack	3:23.62	

=== Final ===
Rank	Nation	Athletes	Time	Notes
1st place, gold medalist(s)	England	David McKenzie, Peter Crampton, Adrian Patrick, Du'aine Ladejo	3:02.14	GR
2nd place, silver medalist(s)	Jamaica	Orville Taylor, Dennis Blake, Linval Laird, Garth Robinson	3:02.32	
3rd place, bronze medalist(s)	Trinidad and Tobago	Patrick Delice, Neil de Silva, Hayden Stephen, Ian Morris	3:02.78	
4	Nigeria	Omokaro Alohan, Olapade Adeniken, Emmanuel Okoli, Sunday Bada	3:03.06	
5	Australia	Mark Moresi, Brett Callaghan, Michael Joubert, Paul Greene	3:03.46	
6	South Africa	Hermanus de Jager, Arnaud Malherbe, Riaan Dempers, Bobang Phiri	3:03.87	
7	Wales	Peter Maitland, Jamie Baulch, Paul Gray, Iwan Thomas	3:07.80	
	Kenya	Abednego Matilu, Gideon Biwott, Julius Chepkwony, Charles Gitonga	DQ	
