= Athletics at the 1994 Commonwealth Games – Men's 400 metres =

Men's 400 metres at the Commonwealth Games

The men's 400 metres event at the 1994 Commonwealth Games was held on 22 and 23 August at the Centennial Stadium in Victoria, British Columbia.

== Medalists ==
Gold	Silver	Bronze
Charles Gitonga; Kenya	Du'aine Ladejo; England	Sunday Bada; Nigeria

== Results ==
=== Heats ===
Rank	Heat	Name	Nationality	Time	Notes
1	3	Eswort Coombs	Saint Vincent and the Grenadines	46.36	Q
2	4	David McKenzie	England	46.39	Q
3	8	Iwan Thomas	Wales	46.46	Q
4	1	Paul McBurney	Northern Ireland	46.49	Q
5	2	Paul Greene	Australia	46.56	Q
6	3	Patrick Delice	Trinidad and Tobago	46.61	Q
7	4	Bobang Phiri	South Africa	46.67	Q
8	6	Neil de Silva	Trinidad and Tobago	46.70	Q
9	4	Arnold Payne	Zimbabwe	46.77	Q
10	3	Ibrahim Hassan	Ghana	46.80	Q
11	7	Francis Ogola	Uganda	46.81	Q
12	4	Shaun Farrell	New Zealand	46.84	q
13	8	Sunday Bada	Nigeria	46.91	Q
14	3	Jamie Baulch	Wales	46.93	q
15	2	Ahmed Agabus	Ghana	46.97	Q
16	4	Hayden Stephen	Trinidad and Tobago	47.09	q
17	1	Brett Callaghan	Australia	47.10	Q
18	1	Brian Whittle	Scotland	47.12	Q
18	8	Byron Goodwin	Canada	47.12	Q
20	3	Désiré Pierre-Louis	Mauritius	47.16	q
20	6	Omokaro Alohan	Nigeria	47.16	Q
20	8	Michael Joubert	Australia	47.16	q
23	7	Charles Gitonga	Kenya	47.26	Q
24	2	Arnaud Malherbe	South Africa	47.29	Q
25	7	Danny McFarlane	Jamaica	47.30	Q
26	8	Riaan Dempers	South Africa	47.50	q
27	5	Abednego Matilu	Kenya	47.52	Q
28	1	Linval Laird	Jamaica	47.53	q
29	2	Carl Oliver	Bahamas	47.57	q
30	1	Alex Fugallo	England	47.58	
31	5	Rayton Archer	Canada	47.62	Q
32	5	Jude Monye	Nigeria	47.63	Q
33	3	Joseph Magut	Kenya	47.71	
34	7	Evripides Demosthenous	Cyprus	47.78	
35	8	Ralph Blaauw	Namibia	47.78	
36	2	Roxbert Martin	Jamaica	47.84	
37	5	Rodney Forde	Barbados	47.90	
37	6	Du'aine Ladejo	England	47.90	Q
39	6	Kenmore Hughes	Antigua and Barbuda	48.11	
40	6	Maxime Charlemagne	Saint Lucia	48.14	
41	2	Roger Jordan	Barbados	49.28	
42	8	Kenneth Moima	Botswana	49.74	
43	6	Mario Todman	British Virgin Islands	49.76	
44	7	Motlatsi Maseela	Lesotho	50.27	
45	7	Dwight Stewart	Saint Vincent and the Grenadines	50.61	
46	3	Ronald Flierl	Papua New Guinea	50.80	
47	4	Michael Joseph	Belize	51.78	
48	7	Elroy Shaw	Belize	53.38	
	1	Solomon Amegatcher	Ghana	DNF	
	1	Thabani Gonye	Zimbabwe	DNF	
	3	Mark Graham	Canada	DQ	
	5	Mohamed Arman Sanip	Brunei	DQ	
	2	Sugath Thilakaratne	Sri Lanka	DNS	
	4	Ndumiso Mdziniso	Swaziland	DNS	
	5	Roger Mathavious	British Virgin Islands	DNS	
	6	Keteng Baloseng	Botswana	DNS	

=== Quarterfinals ===
Rank	Heat	Name	Nationality	Time	Notes
1	1	Neil de Silva	Trinidad and Tobago	46.04	Q
2	4	Charles Gitonga	Kenya	46.16	Q
3	4	Bobang Phiri	South Africa	46.16	Q
4	1	Sunday Bada	Nigeria	46.18	Q
5	3	Du'aine Ladejo	England	46.26	Q
6	4	Francis Ogola	Uganda	46.27	Q
7	1	Iwan Thomas	Wales	46.37	Q
8	4	David McKenzie	England	46.38	Q
9	3	Abednego Matilu	Kenya	46.44	Q
10	4	Jamie Baulch	Wales	46.45	
11	1	Danny McFarlane	Jamaica	46.47	Q
12	3	Eswort Coombs	Saint Vincent and the Grenadines	46.48	Q
13	2	Paul Greene	Australia	46.54	Q
14	2	Ahmed Agabus	Ghana	46.63	Q
15	2	Omokaro Alohan	Nigeria	46.66	Q
16	2	Hayden Stephen	Trinidad and Tobago	46.68	Q
17	2	Paul McBurney	Northern Ireland	46.78	
18	4	Jude Monye	Nigeria	46.95	
19	1	Brian Whittle	Scotland	47.00	
19	3	Patrick Delice	Trinidad and Tobago	47.00	Q
19	4	Ibrahim Hassan	Ghana	47.00	
22	1	Brett Callaghan	Australia	47.04	
23	4	Linval Laird	Jamaica	47.21	
24	1	Désiré Pierre-Louis	Mauritius	47.23	
25	3	Michael Joubert	Australia	47.40	
26	2	Arnold Payne	Zimbabwe	47.50	
27	3	Shaun Farrell	New Zealand	47.60	
28	2	Arnaud Malherbe	South Africa	47.68	
29	3	Carl Oliver	Bahamas	47.71	
30	3	Rayton Archer	Canada	47.72	
31	2	Byron Goodwin	Canada	48.11	
32	1	Riaan Dempers	South Africa	49.07	

=== Semifinals ===
Rank	Heat	Name	Nationality	Time	Notes
1	2	Du'aine Ladejo	England	45.20	Q
2	2	Sunday Bada	Nigeria	45.32	Q
3	2	Bobang Phiri	South Africa	45.45	Q
4	2	Eswort Coombs	Saint Vincent and the Grenadines	45.54	Q
5	2	Abednego Matilu	Kenya	45.67	
6	1	Patrick Delice	Trinidad and Tobago	45.68	Q
7	1	Paul Greene	Australia	45.72	Q
8	1	Charles Gitonga	Kenya	45.80	Q
9	2	Hayden Stephen	Trinidad and Tobago	45.83	
10	1	Neil de Silva	Trinidad and Tobago	45.80	Q
11	2	Iwan Thomas	Wales	45.98	
12	1	David McKenzie	England	46.18	
13	2	Danny McFarlane	Jamaica	46.19	
14	1	Ahmed Agabus	Ghana	46.30	
15	1	Francis Ogola	Uganda	46.47	
16	1	Omokaro Alohan	Nigeria	46.71	

=== Final ===
Rank	Lane	Name	Nationality	Time	Notes
1st place, gold medalist(s)	8	Charles Gitonga	Kenya	45.00	
2nd place, silver medalist(s)	6	Du'aine Ladejo	England	45.11	
3rd place, bronze medalist(s)	4	Sunday Bada	Nigeria	45.45	
4	5	Paul Greene	Australia	45.50	
5	3	Patrick Delice	Trinidad and Tobago	45.89	
6	7	Eswort Coombs	Saint Vincent and the Grenadines	45.96	
7	1	Neil de Silva	Trinidad and Tobago	46.27	
8	2	Bobang Phiri	South Africa	46.35	
