= 1995 World Championships in Athletics – Men's 400 metres =

Men's 400 metres at the 1995 World Championships
- Venue: Ullevi Stadium
- Dates: 5 August (heats); 6 August (quarter-finals); 7 August (semi-finals); 9 August (final)
- Competitors: 48
- Winning time: 43.39 CR

Medalists
gold medal	Michael Johnson	United States
silver medal	Butch Reynolds	United States
bronze medal	Greg Haughton	Jamaica

These are the official results of the Men's 400 metres event at the 1995 IAAF World Championships in Gothenburg, Sweden. There were a total number of 51 participating athletes, with two semi-finals, four quarter-finals and seven qualifying heats and the final held on Wednesday 1995-08-09. The winning margin was 0.83 seconds.

== Final ==
RANK	FINAL	TIME
	Michael Johnson (USA)	43.39
	Butch Reynolds (USA)	44.22
	Greg Haughton (JAM)	44.56
4.	Samson Kitur (KEN)	44.71
5.	Mark Richardson (GBR)	44.81
6.	Darnell Hall (USA)	44.83
7.	Roger Black (GBR)	45.28
8.	Sunday Bada (NGR)	45.50

== Semi-finals ==
- Held on Monday 1995-08-07

RANK	HEAT 1	TIME
1.	Michael Johnson (USA)	44.91
2.	Sunday Bada (NGR)	45.03
3.	Darnell Hall (USA)	45.07
4.	Roger Black (GBR)	45.32
5.	Abednego Matilu (KEN)	45.41
6.	Davian Clarke (JAM)	45.58
7.	Matthias Rusterholz (SUI)	45.80
8.	Davis Kamoga (UGA)	45.92

RANK	HEAT 2	TIME
1.	Greg Haughton (JAM)	44.70
2.	Butch Reynolds (USA)	45.10
3.	Samson Kitur (KEN)	45.27
4.	Mark Richardson (GBR)	45.42
5.	Jude Monye (NGR)	45.95
6.	Danny McFarlane (JAM)	45.98
7.	Norberto Téllez (CUB)	46.68
—	Ibrahim Ismail Muftah (QAT)	DNS

== Quarterfinals ==
- Held on Sunday 1995-08-06

RANK	HEAT 1	TIME
1.	Butch Reynolds (USA)	44.63
2.	Abednego Matilu (KEN)	44.97
3.	Roger Black (GBR)	45.01
4.	Jude Monye (NGR)	45.16
5.	Francis Ogola (UGA)	45.64
6.	Troy McIntosh (BAH)	45.72
7.	Arnaud Malherbe (RSA)	46.12
8.	Hachim Ndiaye (SEN)	46.96

RANK	HEAT 2	TIME
1.	Darnell Hall (USA)	45.09
2.	Greg Haughton (JAM)	45.12
3.	Ibrahim Ismail Muftah (QAT)	45.31
4.	Davis Kamoga (UGA)	45.50
5.	Inaldo Sena (BRA)	45.71
6.	Jorge Crusellas (CUB)	46.09
7.	Adrian Patrick (GBR)	46.27
8.	Eswort Coombs (VIN)	47.15

RANK	HEAT 3	TIME
1.	Samson Kitur (KEN)	45.25
2.	Mark Richardson (GBR)	45.30
3.	Matthias Rusterholz (SUI)	45.54
4.	Danny McFarlane (JAM)	45.79
5.	Andrea Nuti (ITA)	45.89
6.	Pierre-Marie Hilaire (FRA)	46.01
7.	Shon Ju-Il (KOR)	46.31
8.	Paul Greene (AUS)	46.36

RANK	HEAT 4	TIME
1.	Michael Johnson (USA)	45.15
2.	Sunday Bada (NGR)	45.29
3.	Norberto Téllez (CUB)	45.68
4.	Davian Clarke (JAM)	45.69
5.	Bobang Phiri (RSA)	45.94
6.	Kennedy Ochieng (KEN)	46.15
7.	Michael Joubert (AUS)	46.61
8.	Amar Hacini (ALG)	46.64

== Qualifying heats ==
- Held on Saturday 1995-08-05

RANK	HEAT 1	TIME
1.	Roger Black (GBR)	45.81
2.	Kennedy Ochieng (KEN)	45.87
3.	Arnaud Malherbe (RSA)	46.09
4.	Amar Hacini (ALG)	46.29
5.	Udeme Ekpeyong (NGR)	46.41
6.	Ahmed Ali (GHA)	46.75
7.	Kenmore Hughes (ATG)	47.26
8.	Medard Makanga (CGO)	47.38

RANK	HEAT 2	TIME
1.	Ibrahim Ismail Muftah (QAT)	45.10
2.	Davis Kamoga (UGA)	45.34
3.	Darnell Hall (USA)	45.34
4.	Bobang Phiri (RSA)	45.94
5.	Paul Greene (AUS)	46.25
6.	Desire Pierre-Louis (MRI)	46.73
7.	Evripides Demosthenous (CYP)	46.84

RANK	HEAT 3	TIME
1.	Mark Richardson (GBR)	45.61
2.	Greg Haughton (JAM)	45.62
3.	Francis Ogola (UGA)	45.70
4.	Eswort Coombs (VIN)	46.06
5.	Hachim Ndiaye (SEN)	46.31
6.	Maxime Charlemagne (LCA)	48.21
—	Arnold Payne (ZIM)	DQ
—	Sebastián Keitel (CHI)	DNS

RANK	HEAT 4	TIME
1.	Michael Johnson (USA)	45.49
2.	Abednego Matilu (KEN)	45.80
3.	Davian Clarke (JAM)	45.92
4.	Adrian Patrick (GBR)	46.11
5.	Pablo Escriba (ESP)	46.85
6.	Omar Mena (CUB)	47.53
—	Stephen Lugor (SUD)	DQ

RANK	HEAT 5	TIME
1.	Butch Reynolds (USA)	45.60
2.	Matthias Rusterholz (SUI)	45.97
3.	Pierre-Marie Hilaire (FRA)	46.13
4.	Jude Monye (NGR)	46.25
5.	Jorge Crusellas (CUB)	46.32
6.	Mohammed Al-Beshi (KSA)	46.76
7.	Richard Jones (GUY)	47.36

RANK	HEAT 6	TIME
1.	Samson Kitur (KEN)	45.63
2.	Norberto Téllez (CUB)	45.72
3.	Inaldo Sena (BRA)	45.75
4.	Troy McIntosh (BAH)	45.87
5.	Michael Joubert (AUS)	46.31
6.	Justice Dipeba (BOT)	46.57
7.	Raymundo Escalante (MEX)	48.29

RANK	HEAT 7	TIME
1.	Sunday Bada (NGR)	46.08
2.	Andrea Nuti (ITA)	46.25
3.	Danny McFarlane (JAM)	46.27
4.	Shon Ju-Il (KOR)	46.41
5.	Sanderlei Parrela (BRA)	46.59
6.	Hayden Stephen (TRI)	47.64
7.	Salomone Bole (FIJ)	47.92
—	Alvaro James (CRC)	DQ
