= 1995 World Championships in Athletics – Men's 4 × 400 metres relay =

These are the results of the men's 4 × 400 metres relay event at the 1995 World Championships in Athletics in Gothenburg, Sweden.

== Medalists ==
Gold	Silver	Bronze
United States; Marlon Ramsey; Derek Mills; Butch Reynolds; Michael Johnson; Kevin Lyles*; Darnell Hall*	Jamaica; Michael McDonald; Davian Clarke; Danny McFarlane; Gregory Haughton; Dennis Blake*	Nigeria; Udeme Ekpeyong; Kunle Adejuyigbe; Jude Monye; Sunday Bada

* Runners who participated in the heats only and received medals.

== Results ==
=== Heats ===
Qualification: First 2 of each heat (Q) plus the 2 fastest times (q) advance to the final.

Rank	Heat	Nation	Athletes	Time	Notes
1	1	United States	Marlon Ramsey, Derek Mills, Kevin Lyles, Darnell Hall	2:58.23	Q
2	1	Jamaica	Michael McDonald, Davian Clarke, Dennis Blake, Danny McFarlane	2:58.29	Q
3	1	Germany	Uwe Jahn, Karsten Just, Kai Karsten, Rico Lieder	3:00.25	q
4	2	Kenya	Samson Kitur, Abednego Matilu, Julius Chepkwony, Charles Gitonga	3:00.81	Q
5	3	Nigeria	Udeme Ekpeyong, Jude Monye, Kunle Adejuyigbe, Sunday Bada	3:00.81	Q
6	3	Great Britain	David McKenzie, Adrian Patrick, Mark Hylton, Mark Richardson	3:01.22	Q
7	3	Poland	Piotr Rysiukiewicz, Paweł Januszewski, Robert Maćkowiak, Tomasz Jędrusik	3:01.38	q
8	1	Japan	Shunji Karube, Yoshihiko Saito, Kazuhiko Yamazaki, Masayoshi Kan	3:01.46	
9	3	South Africa	Hermanus de Jager, Arnaud Malherbe, Riaan Dempers, Bobang Phiri	3:01.51	NR
10	2	Cuba	Iván García, Jorge Crusellas, Omar Mena, Norberto Téllez	3:01.82	Q
11	1	Italy	Marco Vaccari, Laurent Ottoz, Alessandro Aimar, Andrea Nuti	3:02.01	
12	1	Bahamas	Troy McIntosh, Dennis Darling, Timothy Munnings, Carl Oliver	3:02.85	NR
13	2	Australia	Rohan Robinson, Michael Joubert, Mark Ladbrook, Paul Greene	3:03.07	
14	2	Switzerland	Laurent Clerc, Kevin Widmer, Alain Rohr, Matthias Rusterholz	3:03.91	NR
15	3	Zimbabwe	Arnold Payne, Savieri Ngidhi, Tawanda Chiwira, Ken Harnden	3:03.91	NR
16	2	Senegal	Moustapha Diarra, Ibrahima Wade, Ibou Faye, Hachim Ndiaye	3:05.15	
17	3	New Zealand	Callum Taylor, Nick Cowan, Mark Wilson, Robert Hanna	3:06.39	
18	1	Mexico	Alejandro Cárdenas, Juan Vallin, Alberto Araujo, Raymundo Escalante	3:07.22	
19	2	France	Jacques Farraudiere, Pierre-Marie Hilaire, Marc Foucan, Jean-Louis Rapnouil	3:09.46	
—N/a	2	Saudi Arabia	Salah Al-Nassri, Mohamed Al-Bishi, Hashim Al-Sharfa, Hadi Soua'an Al-Somaily	DNF	
—N/a	3	Trinidad and Tobago		DNS	

=== Final ===
Rank	Nation	Athletes	Time	Notes
1st place, gold medalist(s)	United States	Marlon Ramsey, Derek Mills, Butch Reynolds, Michael Johnson	2:57.32	
2nd place, silver medalist(s)	Jamaica	Michael McDonald, Davian Clarke, Danny McFarlane, Gregory Haughton	2:59.88	
3rd place, bronze medalist(s)	Nigeria	Udeme Ekpeyong, Kunle Adejuyigbe, Jude Monye, Sunday Bada	3:03.18	
4	Great Britain	David McKenzie, Mark Hylton, Adrian Patrick, Roger Black	3:03.75	
5	Poland	Piotr Rysiukiewicz, Paweł Januszewski, Robert Maćkowiak, Tomasz Jędrusik	3:03.84	
6	Cuba	José Pérez, Jorge Crusellas, Omar Mena, Norberto Téllez	3:07.65	
—N/a	Germany	Uwe Jahn, Karsten Just, Kai Karsten, Rico Lieder	DQ	
—N/a	Kenya	Samson Kitur, Julius Chepkwony, Kennedy Ochieng, Charles Gitonga	DNS	
