= Athletics at the 1994 Commonwealth Games – Men's 400 metres hurdles =

Men's 400 metres hurdles at the Commonwealth Games

The men's 400 metres hurdles event at the 1994 Commonwealth Games was held on 25 and 26 August at the Centennial Stadium in Victoria, British Columbia.

== Medalists ==
Gold	Silver	Bronze
Samuel Matete; Zambia	Gideon Biwott; Kenya	Barnabas Kinyor; Kenya

== Results ==
=== Heats ===
Rank	Heat	Name	Nationality	Time	Notes
1	2	Samuel Matete	Zambia	49.13	Q
2	2	Gideon Biwott	Kenya	50.08	Q
2	3	Barnabas Kinyor	Kenya	50.08	Q
4	1	Gary Cadogan	England	50.18	Q
5	1	Rohan Robinson	Australia	50.22	Q
6	3	Kenneth Harnden	Zimbabwe	50.69	Q
7	3	Peter Crampton	England	50.92	q
8	3	Ian Weakley	Jamaica	50.95	q
9	1	Mitchell Francis	Jamaica	50.97	
10	2	Steve Coupland	England	51.34	
11	1	Rerei Sang	Kenya	51.37	
12	2	Winston Sinclair	Jamaica	51.54	
13	1	Kostas Pochanis	Cyprus	51.78	
14	3	Monte Raymond	Canada	51.84	
15	3	Judex Lefou	Mauritius	52.35	
16	2	Muhammad Amin	Pakistan	52.43	
17	2	Thomas Zverina	Canada	52.44	
18	1	Gilbert Hashan	Mauritius	52.61	
19	3	Nick Ward	Australia	53.02	
20	2	Abdurahim Nayeem	Bangladesh	53.97	
21	3	Kaminiel Selot	Papua New Guinea	54.39	
22	1	Shawn Browne	Barbados	55.81	
23	3	Phil Harries	Wales	59.52	
	1	Laurent Birade	Canada	DQ	
	2	Simon Hollingsworth	Australia	DNF	

=== Final ===
Rank	Lane	Name	Nationality	Time	Notes
1st place, gold medalist(s)	3	Samuel Matete	Zambia	48.67	GR
2nd place, silver medalist(s)	6	Gideon Biwott	Kenya	49.43	
3rd place, bronze medalist(s)	4	Barnabas Kinyor	Kenya	49.50	
4	5	Gary Cadogan	England	49.71	
5	8	Rohan Robinson	Australia	49.76	
6	7	Kenneth Harnden	Zimbabwe	50.02	
7	1	Peter Crampton	England	50.37	
8	2	Ian Weakley	Jamaica	51.25	
