= Athletics at the 1993 Summer Universiade – Men's 400 metres =

The men's 400 metres event at the 1993 Summer Universiade was held at the UB Stadium in Buffalo, United States on 15, 16 and 17 July 1993.

== Medalists ==
Gold	Silver	Bronze
Ibrahim Hassan; Ghana	Evon Clarke; Jamaica	Danny McFarlane; Jamaica

== Results ==
=== Heats ===
Rank	Heat	Athlete	Nationality	Time	Notes
1	1	Derek Mills	United States	46.32	Q
2	1	Udeme Ekpeyong	Nigeria	46.36	Q
3	4	Tsvetoslav Stankulov	Bulgaria	46.81	Q
4	3	Ibrahim Hassan	Ghana	46.82	Q
5	2	LaMont Smith	United States	46.83	Q
6	1	Paul Greene	Australia	47.01	Q
7	3	Seiji Inagaki	Japan	47.06	Q
8	2	Danny McFarlane	Jamaica	47.13	Q
9	3	Evon Clarke	Jamaica	47.19	Q
10	4	Byron Goodwin	Canada	47.20	Q
11	5	Omokaro Alohan	Nigeria	47.25	Q
12	4	Masayoshi Kan	Japan	47.42	Q
13	2	Alessandro Aimar	Italy	47.51	Q
14	5	Dejan Jovković	Independent Participants	47.57	Q
15	1	Nick Cowan	New Zealand	48.19	Q
16	3	Alessandro Pinna	Italy	48.22	Q
17	3	Amador Mohedano	Spain	48.29	q
18	5	Hayden Stephen	Trinidad and Tobago	48.42	Q
19	2	Arnold Payne	Zimbabwe	48.44	Q
20	3	Jason Kougellis	Australia	48.49	q
21	5	Andrew Ndaula	Uganda	48.53	Q
22	2	Derick Fredericks	South Africa	48.74	q
23	4	Darren Dale	New Zealand	49.35	Q
24	4	Thompson Harokave	Papua New Guinea	49.93	q
25	4	Emmanuel Ngega	Tanzania	50.15	
26	2	Mohamed Mehdi Hasan	Bangladesh	50.52	
27	1	Almamy Farma	Sierra Leone	53.01	
28	5	Fabio Canini	San Marino	55.33	
29	3	W. Rohana	Sri Lanka	55.79	
30	5	Konstadinos Kederis	Greece	1:02.31	

=== Quarterfinals ===
Rank	Heat	Athlete	Nationality	Time	Notes
1	1	Evon Clarke	Jamaica	46.50	Q
2	1	Derek Mills	United States	46.61	Q
3	2	Ibrahim Hassan	Ghana	46.66	Q
4	3	Masayoshi Kan	Japan	46.69	Q
5	3	Tsvetoslav Stankulov	Bulgaria	46.82	Q
6	1	Udeme Ekpeyong	Nigeria	46.87	Q
7	3	Danny McFarlane	Jamaica	46.91	Q
8	1	Seiji Inagaki	Japan	46.94	Q
8	2	LaMont Smith	United States	46.94	Q
10	2	Byron Goodwin	Canada	47.07	Q
11	3	Omokaro Alohan	Nigeria	47.09	Q
12	2	Dejan Jovković	Independent Participants	47.14	Q
13	3	Paul Greene	Australia	47.15	Q
14	1	Alessandro Aimar	Italy	47.42	Q
15	2	Hayden Stephen	Trinidad and Tobago	47.48	Q
16	2	Jason Kougellis	Australia	47.88	q
17	1	Arnold Payne	Zimbabwe	48.01	
18	1	Andrew Ndaula	Uganda	48.01	
19	2	Amador Mohedano	Spain	48.09	
20	2	Nick Cowan	New Zealand	48.22	
21	3	Derick Fredericks	South Africa	48.36	
22	3	Alessandro Pinna	Italy	48.49	
	?	Darren Dale	New Zealand	??.??	
	?	Thompson Harokave	Papua New Guinea	??.??	

=== Semifinals ===
Rank	Heat	Athlete	Nationality	Time	Notes
1	1	Ibrahim Hassan	Ghana	46.12	Q
2	1	LaMont Smith	United States	46.27	Q
3	2	Paul Greene	Australia	46.40	Q
4	2	Evon Clarke	Jamaica	46.46	Q
5	1	Danny McFarlane	Jamaica	46.54	Q
6	1	Masayoshi Kan	Japan	46.55	Q
7	2	Byron Goodwin	Canada	46.69	Q
8	2	Derek Mills	United States	46.90	Q
9	2	Seiji Inagaki	Japan	47.15	
10	1	Alessandro Aimar	Italy	47.25	
11	1	Udeme Ekpeyong	Nigeria	47.45	
12	2	Dejan Jovković	Independent Participants	47.74	
13	2	Jason Kougellis	Australia	48.01	
	?	Hayden Stephen	Trinidad and Tobago	??.??	
	?	Tsvetoslav Stankulov	Bulgaria	??.??	
	?	Omokaro Alohan	Nigeria	??.??	

=== Final ===
Rank	Lane	Athlete	Nationality	Time	Notes
1st place, gold medalist(s)	4	Ibrahim Hassan	Ghana	45.87	
2nd place, silver medalist(s)	6	Evon Clarke	Jamaica	46.27	
3rd place, bronze medalist(s)	7	Danny McFarlane	Jamaica	46.60	
4	8	Byron Goodwin	Canada	46.62	
5	5	Paul Greene	Australia	46.91	
6	2	Masayoshi Kan	Japan	47.23	
7	3	LaMont Smith	United States	49.78	
	1	Derek Mills	United States	DNS	
