= Athletics at the 1994 Commonwealth Games – Men's 4 × 100 metres relay =

Men's 4 × 100 metres relay at the Commonwealth Games

The men's 4 × 100 metres relay event at the 1994 Commonwealth Games was held on 27 and 28 August at the Centennial Stadium in Victoria, British Columbia.

== Medalists ==
Gold	Silver	Bronze
Canada; Donovan Bailey; Glenroy Gilbert; Carlton Chambers; Bruny Surin	Australia; Shane Naylor; Tim Jackson; Paul Henderson; Damien Marsh; Kyle Vander Kuyp*	England; Jason John; Toby Box; Philip Goedluck; Terry Williams; Mark Smith*

* Athletes who competed in heats only and received medals.

== Results ==
=== Heats ===
Rank	Heat	Nation	Athletes	Time	Notes
1	2	Canada	Donovan Bailey, Glenroy Gilbert, Carlton Chambers, Bruny Surin	38.63	Q, GR
2	1	Jamaica	Garth Robinson, Michael Green, Warren Johnson, Leon Gordon	39.33	Q
3	1	Australia	Shane Naylor, Tim Jackson, Paul Henderson, Kyle Vander Kuyp	39.49	Q
4	2	England	Mark Smith, Toby Box, Philip Goedluck, Terry Williams	39.51	Q
5	2	Ghana	Christian Nsiah, Eric Nkansah, Salaam Gariba, Nelson Boateng	39.84	Q
6	2	Scotland	Duncan Mathieson, Ian Mackie, Jamie Henderson, Doug Walker	40.16	q
7	2	Botswana	Jwagamang Karesaza, Justice Dloeba, Kenneth Moima, Moatshe Molebatsi	41.31	q
8	1	Gambia	Abodourahman Jallow, Samuel Johnson, Ebrima Bojang, Abdoulie Janneh	41.97	Q
9	1	British Virgin Islands	Derwin Scatliffe, Ralston Varlack, Keita Cline, Mario Todman	41.99	
10	2	Belize	Michael Joseph, Elston Shaw, Leopold Lamb, Linford Castillo	42.55	
11	1	Tonga	Sekona Vi, Tevita Fauonuku, Toluta'u Koula, Paea Funaki	42.89	
	1	Nigeria	Franklin Nwankpa, Deji Aliu, Oluyemi Kayode, Olapade Adeniken	DNF	
	1	Sierra Leone	Denton Guy-Williams, Horace Dove-Edwin, Francis Keita, Sanusi Turay	~~39.71~~	DQ^{1}

^{1}Sierra Leone had originally qualified for the final, but they were disqualified after Horace Dove-Edwin tested positive for stanozolol that afternoon; The Gambia took their place in the final.

=== Final ===
Rank	Lane	Nation	Athletes	Time	Notes
1st place, gold medalist(s)	6	Canada	Donovan Bailey, Glenroy Gilbert, Carlton Chambers, Bruny Surin	38.39	GR
2nd place, silver medalist(s)	5	Australia	Shane Naylor, Tim Jackson, Paul Henderson, Damien Marsh	38.88	
3rd place, bronze medalist(s)	4	England	Jason John, Toby Box, Philip Goedluck, Terry Williams	39.39	
4	3	Jamaica	Garth Robinson, John Mair, Warren Johnson, Leon Gordon	39.44	
5	7	Scotland	Elliot Bunney, Ian Mackie, Jamie Henderson, Doug Walker	39.56	
6	8	Ghana	Christian Nsiah, Eric Nkansah, Salaam Gariba, Nelson Boateng	39.79	
7	1	Gambia	Abodourahman Jallow, Samuel Johnson, Ebrima Bojang, Abdoulie Janneh	41.54	
8	2	Botswana	Jwagamang Karesaza, Justice Dipeba, Kenneth Moima, Moatshe Molebatsi	41.55	
