= Athletics at the 1994 Commonwealth Games – Men's 200 metres =

Men's 200 metres at the Commonwealth Games

The men's 200 metres event at the 1994 Commonwealth Games was held on 25 and 26 August at the Centennial Stadium in Victoria, British Columbia.

== Medalists ==
Gold	Silver	Bronze
Frankie Fredericks; Namibia	John Regis; England	Daniel Effiong; Nigeria

== Results ==
=== Heats ===
Wind:
Heat 1: -1.5 m/s, Heat 2: ? m/s, Heat 3: +0.6 m/s, Heat 4: +0.1 m/s, Heat 5: +0.6 m/s, Heat 6: +1.2 m/s, Heat 7: +0.7 m/s, Heat 8: +0.6 m/s, Heat 9: +0.5 m/s,

Rank	Heat	Name	Nationality	Time	Notes
1	1	Daniel Effiong	Nigeria	20.78	Q
2	9	Oluyemi Kayode	Nigeria	20.90	Q
3	6	Troy Douglas	Bermuda	20.94	Q
4	1	Terry Williams	England	21.03	Q
4	8	John Regis	England	21.03	Q
6	2	Damien Marsh	Australia	21.06	Q
7	5	Ato Boldon	Trinidad and Tobago	21.09	Q
8	4	Steve Brimacombe	Australia	21.10	Q
9	6	Garth Robinson	Jamaica	21.11	Q
10	8	Anninos Marcoullides	Cyprus	21.12	Q
11	4	Douglas Walker	Scotland	21.14	Q
12	4	Paul McBurney	Northern Ireland	21.14	Q
13	5	Joseph Gikonyo	Kenya	21.20	Q
14	6	Toby Box	England	21.22	Q
15	9	Peter Maitland	Wales	21.23	Q
16	6	Jamie Baulch	Wales	21.24	q
16	9	Peter Ogilvie	Canada	21.24	Q
18	3	Frankie Fredericks	Namibia	21.25	Q
19	1	Nelson Boateng	Ghana	21.26	Q
19	4	Atlee Mahorn	Canada	21.26	q
21	5	Ian Mackie	Scotland	21.30	Q
22	8	Alvin Daniel	Trinidad and Tobago	21.36	Q
23	2	Ricardo Greenidge	Canada	21.37	Q
24	3	Eswort Coombs	Saint Vincent and the Grenadines	21.38	Q
24	8	Orville Taylor	Jamaica	21.38	q
26	9	Justice Dipeba	Botswana	21.43	q
27	7	Eric Nkansah	Ghana	21.46	Q
28	3	Yiannis Zisimides	Cyprus	21.52	Q
29	1	Joselyn Thomas	Sierra Leone	21.53	q
30	1	Saeed Qawee	Jamaica	21.55	
31	7	Iwan Thomas	Wales	21.56	Q
32	7	Francis Ogola	Uganda	21.58	Q
33	9	Kenmore Hughes	Antigua and Barbuda	21.65	
34	2	Dominique Méyépa	Mauritius	21.66	Q
35	5	Johann Venter	South Africa	21.69	
36	3	Christian Nsiah	Ghana	21.77	
37	6	Peter Pulu	Papua New Guinea	21.78	
38	7	Bode Osagiobare	Nigeria	21.79	
39	5	Achebe Hope	Barbados	21.83	
40	1	Subul Babo	Papua New Guinea	21.95	
41	5	Barnabe Jolicoeur	Mauritius	22.00	
42	4	Toluta'u Koula	Tonga	22.12	
42	6	Vincent van Rooyen	Namibia	22.12	
42	9	Stephen Lewis	Montserrat	22.12	
45	2	Azmi Ibrahim	Malaysia	22.16	
46	2	Ebrima Bojang	Gambia	22.20	
47	7	Osborne Johnson	Saint Vincent and the Grenadines	22.26	
48	3	Moatshe Molebatsi	Botswana	22.34	
49	4	Samuel Johnson	Gambia	22.49	
50	8	Ronald Flierl	Papua New Guinea	22.50	
51	2	Tevita Fauonuku	Tonga	22.50	
52	5	Mario Todman	British Virgin Islands	22.53	
53	1	Mohamed Arman Sanip	Brunei	22.67	
54	9	Dexter Browne	Saint Vincent and the Grenadines	22.77	
55	9	Jansen Molisingi	Vanuatu	22.78	
56	8	Frederick Cannon	Nauru	23.05	
57	3	Motlatsi Maseela	Lesotho	23.15	
58	4	Derwin Scatliffe	British Virgin Islands	23.20	
59	6	Razali Matali	Brunei	23.33	
60	3	Michael Joseph	Belize	23.44	
	2	Julius Chepkwony	Kenya	DQ	
	3	Fabian Muyaba	Zimbabwe	DQ	
	4	Kennedy Ondiek	Kenya	DQ	
	7	Roger Jordan	Barbados	DNF	
	8	Aiah Yambasu	Sierra Leone	DNF	
	7	Peter Queeley	Montserrat	DNS	

=== Quarterfinals ===
Wind:
Heat 1: +2.0 m/s, Heat 2: +1.6 m/s, Heat 3: +1.6 m/s, Heat 4: +1.5 m/s

Rank	Heat	Name	Nationality	Time	Notes
1	1	John Regis	England	20.36	Q, GR
2	3	Oluyemi Kayode	Nigeria	20.39	Q
3	4	Frankie Fredericks	Namibia	20.40	Q
4	1	Damien Marsh	Australia	20.46	Q
5	3	Terry Williams	England	20.50	Q
6	2	Ato Boldon	Trinidad and Tobago	20.53	Q
7	4	Daniel Effiong	Nigeria	20.62	Q
8	3	Steve Brimacombe	Australia	20.68	Q
9	2	Troy Douglas	Bermuda	20.70	Q
10	1	Douglas Walker	Scotland	20.71	Q, PB
11	2	Toby Box	England	20.72	Q
12	1	Nelson Boateng	Ghana	20.80	Q
13	2	Paul McBurney	Northern Ireland	20.81	Q
14	2	Garth Robinson	Jamaica	20.82	
15	1	Jamie Baulch	Wales	20.84	
16	1	Anninos Marcoullides	Cyprus	20.96	
16	2	Peter Maitland	Wales	20.96	
16	3	Joseph Gikonyo	Kenya	20.96	Q
19	3	Ian Mackie	Scotland	20.99	
20	4	Ricardo Greenidge	Canada	21.04	Q
21	2	Peter Ogilvie	Canada	21.05	
22	1	Atlee Mahorn	Canada	21.07	
23	4	Eswort Coombs	Saint Vincent and the Grenadines	21.08	Q
24	4	Alvin Daniel	Trinidad and Tobago	21.27	
25	4	Joselyn Thomas	Sierra Leone	21.29	
26	4	Eric Nkansah	Ghana	21.32	
27	3	Justice Dipeba	Botswana	21.41	
28	1	Orville Taylor	Jamaica	21.46	
29	3	Francis Ogola	Uganda	21.49	
30	3	Iwan Thomas	Wales	21.53	
31	4	Yiannis Zisimides	Cyprus	21.56	
32	2	Dominique Méyépa	Mauritius	21.63	

=== Semifinals ===
Wind:
Heat 1: +0.2 m/s, Heat 2: -0.1 m/s

Rank	Heat	Name	Nationality	Time	Notes
1	1	Frankie Fredericks	Namibia	20.43	Q
2	1	Daniel Effiong	Nigeria	20.59	Q
3	1	Damien Marsh	Australia	20.65	Q
3	2	John Regis	England	20.65	Q
5	2	Troy Douglas	Bermuda	20.73	Q
6	2	Steve Brimacombe	Australia	20.77	Q
7	2	Oluyemi Kayode	Nigeria	20.79	Q
8	2	Ato Boldon	Trinidad and Tobago	20.80	
9	1	Terry Williams	England	20.79	Q
10	1	Toby Box	England	21.02	
11	1	Douglas Walker	Scotland	21.08	
12	1	Paul McBurney	Northern Ireland	21.14	
13	2	Nelson Boateng	Ghana	21.18	
14	1	Joseph Gikonyo	Kenya	21.28	
15	2	Ricardo Greenidge	Canada	21.43	
16	2	Eswort Coombs	Saint Vincent and the Grenadines	21.88	

=== Final ===
Wind: +1.5 m/s

Rank	Lane	Name	Nationality	Time	Notes
1st place, gold medalist(s)	5	Frankie Fredericks	Namibia	19.97	GR
2nd place, silver medalist(s)	6	John Regis	England	20.25	
3rd place, bronze medalist(s)	3	Daniel Effiong	Nigeria	20.40	
4	2	Damien Marsh	Australia	20.54	
5	8	Terry Williams	England	20.62	
6	7	Oluyemi Kayode	Nigeria	20.64	
7	1	Steve Brimacombe	Australia	20.67	
8	4	Troy Douglas	Bermuda	20.71	
