= Adrian Patrick =

English sprinter (born 1973)

Personal information
- Nationality: British (English)
- Born: 15 June 1973 (age 53)

Sport
- Sport: Athletics
- Event: 400m
- Club: Windsor, Slough & Eton AC
Medal record
Athletics
Representing England
Commonwealth Games
| Gold medal – first place | 1994 Victoria | 4x400m |

Adrian Leroy John Patrick (born 15 June 1973) is an English former sprinter who specialised in the 400 metres.

== Biography ==
Patrick represented Great Britain at one outdoor and two indoor World Championships. His personal bests in the event are 45.63 seconds outdoors (Lausanne 1995) and 46.77 seconds indoors (Birmingham 1999).

He represented England and won the gold medal in the 4 x 400 metres relay at the 1994 Commonwealth Games held in Victoria, British Columbia, Canada, along with teammates, David McKenzie, Peter Crampton, and Du'aine Ladejo and heat runners Alex Fugallo and Mark Smith.

Patrick finished third behind Mark Richardson and Mark Hylton in the 400 metres event at the 1995 AAA Championships.

== Competition record ==
| Year | Competition | Venue | Position | Event | Notes |
Representing Great Britain and England
| 1990 | World Junior Championships | Plovdiv, Bulgaria | 2nd | 4 × 400 m relay | 3:03.80 |
| 1991 | European Junior Championships | Thessaloniki, Greece | 1st | 4 × 400 m relay | 3:07.22 |
| 1992 | World Junior Championships | Seoul, South Korea | 3rd (h) | 4 × 400 m relay | 3:07.46 |
| 1994 | Commonwealth Games | Victoria, Canada | 1st | 4 × 400 m relay | 3:02.14 |
| 1995 | World Championships | Gothenburg, Sweden | 26th (qf) | 400 m | 46.27 |
| 1995 | World Championships | Gothenburg, Sweden | 4th | 4 × 400 m relay | 3:03.75 |
| 1997 | World Indoor Championships | Paris, France | 10th (h) | 4 × 400 m relay | 3:14.55 |
| 1999 | World Indoor Championships | Maebashi, Japan | 3rd | 4 × 400 m relay | 3:03.20 |
