= 1990 World Junior Championships in Athletics – Men's 4 × 400 metres relay =

The men's 4x400 metres relay event at the 1990 World Junior Championships in Athletics was held in Plovdiv, Bulgaria, at Deveti Septemvri Stadium on 11 and 12 August.

== Medalists ==
Gold	Derek Mills; Marvin Samuels; Reggie Harris; Chris Nelloms; United States
Silver	David Grindley; Adrian Patrick; Craig Winrow; Mark Richardson; United Kingdom
Bronze	Matthew Burmeister; Rohan Robinson; Simon Hollingsworth; Paul Greene; Australia

== Results ==
=== Final ===
12 August

Rank	Nation	Competitors	Time	Notes
1st place, gold medalist(s)	United States	Derek Mills; Marvin Samuels; Reggie Harris; Chris Nelloms	3:02.26	
2nd place, silver medalist(s)	Great Britain	David Grindley; Adrian Patrick; Craig Winrow; Mark Richardson	3:03.80	
3rd place, bronze medalist(s)	Australia	Matthew Burmeister; Rohan Robinson; Simon Hollingsworth; Paul Greene	3:05.51	
4	Soviet Union	Aleksandr Angelov; Aleksey Oleynikov; Aleksandr Belikov; Dmitriy Golovastov	3:05.60	
5	Barbados	Terry Harewood; Steven Roberts; Wayde Payne; Ronald Thorne	3:07.36	
6	East Germany	Daniel Blochwitz; Frank Zerbel; Florian Hennig; Rico Lieder	3:07.39	
7	Japan	Yusuke Horikoshi; Masayoshi Kan; Yoshihiko Saito; Kazuhiko Yamazaki	3:07.58	
8	Kenya	Kennedy Ochieng; Wilson Kipketer; Sammy Biwott; Joseph Chepsiror Kiptanui	3:07.86	

=== Heats ===
11 August

==== Heat 1 ====
Rank	Nation	Competitors	Time	Notes
1	United States	Derek Mills; Marvin Samuels; Reggie Harris; Chris Nelloms	3:05.72	Q
2	United Kingdom	David Grindley; Jim Stevenson; Craig Winrow; Adrian Patrick	3:07.52	Q
3	Japan	Yusuke Horikoshi; Masayoshi Kan; Yoshihiko Saito; Kazuhiko Yamazaki	3:08.18	q
4	Jamaica	Christopher Gallimore; Terrence McCrea; Carl McPherson; Winston Sinclair	3:08.31	
5	West Germany	Daniel Bittner; Sascha von Weschpfennig; Thomas Kälicke; Oliver Daum	3:08.61	
6	Cuba	Norberto Téllez; Norge Bell; Pedro Piñera; Leonardo Prevot	3:10.49	
7	France	Franck Mence; Igor Sibon; Rodrigue Nordin; Willy Migerel	3:11.11	
8	Czechoslovakia	Štefan Balošák; Pavel Soukup; Tomáš Dvořák; Václav Hrích	3:11.85	

==== Heat 2 ====
Rank	Nation	Competitors	Time	Notes
1	Australia	Matthew Burmeister; Andrew Bursill; Simon Hollingsworth; Paul Greene	3:06.81	Q
2	Soviet Union	Aleksandr Angelov; Aleksey Oleynikov; Aleksandr Belikov; Dmitriy Golovastov	3:06.82	Q
3	East Germany	Daniel Blochwitz; Frank Zerbel; Florian Hennig; Rico Lieder	3:07.65	q
4	Kenya	Kennedy Ochieng; Wilson Kipketer; Sammy Biwott; Joseph Chepsiror Kiptanui	3:07.66	q
5	Barbados	Terry Harewood; Steven Roberts; Wayde Payne; Ronald Thorne	3:07.87	q
6	Yugoslavia	Aleksandar Popović; Draško Odrljin; Miro Kocuvan; Matija Šestak	3:09.67	
7	Bulgaria	Anton Sashov; Dian Petkov; Zlatko Georgiev; Konstantin Babalievski	3:10.65	

== Participation ==
According to an unofficial count, 62 athletes from 15 countries participated in the event.

- Australia (5)
- Barbados (4)
- Bulgaria (4)
- Cuba (4)
- Czechoslovakia (4)
- East Germany (4)
- France (4)
- Jamaica (4)
- Japan (4)
- Kenya (4)
- Soviet Union (4)
- United Kingdom (5)
- United States (4)
- West Germany (4)
- Yugoslavia (4)
