= Byron Goodwin =

Canadian athlete (born 1972)

Personal information
- Born: 4 September 1972 (age 54) Winnipeg, Canada

Sport
- Sport: Athletics
- Events: 400 m, 800 m

Byron James Goodwin (born 4 September 1972) is a Canadian retired athlete who competed in the 400 and 800 metres. He represented his country in the 4 × 400 metres relay at the 1999 World Championships.

== Competition record ==
Year	Competition	Venue	Position	Event	Notes
Representing Canada
1991	Pan American Junior Championships	Kingston, Jamaica	10th (h)	400 m	48.89
1991	Pan American Junior Championships	Kingston, Jamaica	4th	4 × 400 m relay	3:11.41
1993	World Indoor Championships	Toronto, Ontario, Canada	4th	4 × 400 m relay	3:07.77
1993	Universiade	Buffalo, United States	4th	400 m	46.62
1993	Universiade	Buffalo, United States	5th	4 × 400 m relay	3:06.83
1994	Jeux de la Francophonie	Bondoufle, France	4th	400 m	46.57
1994	Jeux de la Francophonie	Bondoufle, France	3rd	4 × 400 m relay	3:07.71
1994	Commonwealth Games	Victoria, Canada	31st (qf)	400 m	48.11
1994	Commonwealth Games	Victoria, Canada	10th (h)	4 × 400 m relay	3:07.81
1995	Pan American Games	Mar del Plata, Argentina	5th	800 m	1:47.92
1995	Universiade	Fukuoka, Japan	16th (sf)	800 m	1:53.09
1995	Universiade	Fukuoka, Japan	9th (h)	4 × 400 m relay	3:08.33
1999	Universiade	Palma, Spain	6th (h)	4 × 400 m relay	3:07.26
1999	Pan American Games	Winnipeg, Canada	5th	4 × 400 m relay	3:03.06
1999	World Championships	Seville, Spain	17th (h)	4 × 400 m relay	3:05.60

== Personal bests ==
Outdoor

- 400 metres – 46.15 (Victoria 1994)
- 800 metres – 1:47.33 (Melbourne 1996)

Indoor

- 600 metres – 1:16.10 (Winnipeg 1995)
- 800 metres – 1:50.47 (Minneapolis 1997)
