= 1996 European Athletics Indoor Championships – Men's 400 metres =

The men's 400 metres event at the 1996 European Athletics Indoor Championships was held in Stockholm Globe Arena on 8–9 March.

== Medalists ==
Gold	Silver	Bronze
Du'aine Ladejo; Great Britain	Pierre-Marie Hilaire; France	Ashraf Saber; Italy

== Results ==
=== Heats ===
The first 2 from each heat (Q) and the next 2 fastest (q) qualified for the semifinals.

Rank	Heat	Name	Nationality	Time	Notes
1	1	Ashraf Saber	Italy	47.29	Q
2	2	Kent Ulyatt	Great Britain	47.41	Q
3	2	Fabio Grossi	Italy	47.48	Q
4	1	Lukáš Souček	Czech Republic	47.52	Q
5	5	Tom McGuirk	Ireland	47.73	Q
6	2	Julian Voelkel	Germany	47.55	q
7	2	Vadim Zadoynov	Moldova	47.64	q
8	5	Pierre-Marie Hilaire	France	47.81	Q
9	3	Du'aine Ladejo	Great Britain	47.84	Q
10	5	Matija Šestak	Slovenia	47.88	
11	5	Alexander Müller	Germany	47.91	
12	3	Carlos Silva	Portugal	48.03	Q
13	3	Bruno Wavelet	France	48.07	
14	4	Ingūns Svikliņš	Latvia	48.09	Q
15	4	Aleksandr Dobryanskiy	Russia	48.11	Q
16	4	Konstantinos Kenteris	Greece	48.20	
17	3	Bülent Eren	Turkey	49.41	
	1	Evripides Demosthenous	Cyprus	DQ	
	4	Dusán Kovács	Hungary	DQ	

=== Semifinals ===
The winner of each semifinal (Q) and the next 1 fastest (q) qualified for the final. The subsequent 4 fastest qualified for the B final.

Rank	Heat	Name	Nationality	Time	Notes
1	1	Du'aine Ladejo	Great Britain	46.74	Q
2	3	Ashraf Saber	Italy	47.09	Q
3	2	Pierre-Marie Hilaire	France	47.19	Q
4	2	Julian Voelkel	Germany	47.34	q
5	1	Carlos Silva	Portugal	47.40	qB
6	3	Lukáš Souček	Czech Republic	47.43	qB
7	3	Vadim Zadoynov	Moldova	47.54	qB
8	3	Ingūns Svikliņš	Latvia	47.56	qB
9	1	Tom McGuirk	Ireland	47.66	
10	1	Aleksandr Dobryanskiy	Russia	47.79	
11	2	Kent Ulyatt	Great Britain	52.05	
	2	Fabio Grossi	Italy	DQ	

=== Final ===
Rank	Name	Nationality	Time	Notes
1st place, gold medalist(s)	Du'aine Ladejo	Great Britain	46.12	
2nd place, silver medalist(s)	Pierre-Marie Hilaire	France	46.82	
3rd place, bronze medalist(s)	Ashraf Saber	Italy	46.86	
4	Julian Voelkel	Germany	47.05	

==== B final ====
Rank	Name	Nationality	Time	Notes
1	Vadim Zadoynov	Moldova	47.09	NR
2	Lukáš Souček	Czech Republic	47.20	
3	Ingûns Sviklinš	Latvia	47.22	
	Carlos Silva	Portugal	DQ	
