= Gilmar Santos =

Brazilian middle-distance runner (born 1970)

Personal information
- Born: 16 December 1970 (age 55)

Sport
- Country: Brazil
- Sport: Athletics
- Event: 800 metres

Achievements and titles
- Personal best: 800 m: 1:45.88 (1993)
Medal record
Men's athletics
Representing Brazil
World Indoor Championships
Silver medal – second place	1993 Toronto	Medley relay
South American U20 Championships
Gold medal – first place	1988 Cubatão	4 × 400 m relay
Bronze medal – third place	1988 Cubatão	400 m

Gilmar Da Silva Dos Santos Assumma (born 16 December 1970) is a former Brazilian middle-distance runner. He was sponsored by Ultrapar and competed in multiple world and regional championships representing Brazil in the 1990s. At the 1993 IAAF World Indoor Championships, Santos won a silver medal in the medley relay demonstration event.

== Career ==
In 1987, Santos began to be sponsored by Ultracred, a subsidiary of Ultrapar. At the 1988 South American Junior Championships in Athletics, Santos won the bronze medal in the individual 400 m and ran second leg on the gold-medal-winning 4 × 400 m relay team. He continued his season at the 1988 World U20 Championships 400 m, where he placed sixth in his heat and did not advance.

Still sponsored by Ultracred in 1989, he moved to the United States to train under Luiz Alberto de Oliveira, coach of Joaquim Cruz and Zequinha Barbosa. He shared an apartment in San Diego, California with two other Brazilian athletes. He was one of very few athletes in that era to maintain his sponsorship despite the Plano Collor causing many companies to revoke their sports sponsorships.

At the 1990 Weltklasse Zürich, Santos placed fifth in the 'B' 800 m in a time of 1:48.43.

In June 1991, Santos returned to Brazil to compete in the Troféu Brasil de Atletismo. He also planned to face Cruz and Barbosa at the 1991 Weltklasse Zürich.

Santos belonged to the Organização Funilense de Atletismo (ORCAMPI) club in Brazil. In July 1992, he was runner-up at an 800 m race in San Diego and competed in the Mobil Benepar International Athletics Meeting in São Paulo. On 17 and 18 July, Santos won his heat at the Ibero-American Championships 800 m but was fourth in the finals. In September, he was fifth at the 1992 Indy Games in the 800 m.

Santos entered in both the 800 m and exhibition medley relay event at the 1993 IAAF World Indoor Championships. He was fifth in his 800 m heat and did not advance, but he led off the Brazilian 1600 m medley team to a 3:16.11 final time and silver medal behind only the United States. His 800 m leg split was 1:48.6. Outdoors at the UC Irvine Invitational in April 1993, Santos trailed behind Barbosa in an 800 m and was outkicked, finishing second. Santos then ran a personal best 1:45.88 to win a 16 May 800 m race in São Paulo. At the Ibirapuera meeting before June 1993, Santos beat Barbosa despite Barbosa having bragged beforehand about how he would run 1:44 for 800 m. Santos competed in the 1993 Prefontaine Classic in the 1000 metres, running 2:19.88 to place fifth. In August, he started the Weltklasse in Köln 800 m but didn't finish. Santos represented Brazil at the 1993 World Championships 800 m, where he placed fifth in his heat and did not advance. He ended his season at the 1993 Rieti Meeting, placing fifth in the 'B' 800 m. Santos stayed in San Diego and didn't compete at the 1993 Troféu Brasil de Atletismo due to a calf injury.

Santos competed for the Cuyamaca Coyotes in the California Community College Athletic Association. In May 1994, he won the Orange Empire Conference title in the 800 m with a 1:49.14-minute clocking. Also in 1994, he set the UC Riverside Highlanders track and field facility record over 800 m, running 1:48.3 minutes. At the 1994 Bannes Sao Paulo International Meeting, Santos ran 1:46.90 over 800 m to place fourth. In September 1994, Santos was selected to represent Brazil at the 1994 IAAF World Cup in London.

Santos competed in the 800 m at the 1995 Pan American Games alongside countryman Zequinha Barbosa, who was considered a gold medal threat. In the final, Santos protected Barbosa's position for 600 metres as he led the race, allowing Barbosa to win gold in a new championship record time. Santos finished in fourth, 0.27 seconds behind the bronze medal. He returned to the Sao Paulo International Meeting to place eighth in the 800 m, and later that season won an 800 m in San Diego running 1:46.6.

On 16 March 1996, Santos won the USATF Distance Classic 800 m with a 1:47.59 time. Two years later, he was eighth over 800 m at the Grand Prix Brasil de Atletismo meeting in Rio de Janeiro.

In 1999, Santos ran a 400 m at the Azusa Meet of Champions in Azusa, California, placing fifth. Later that month he returned to the Grand Prix Brasil de Atletismo to place sixth in the 800 m. At the 1999 USATF Distance Classic, he was sixth in the 800 m in 1:48.91, and he was 10th in the 800 m at the 1999 FILA Twilight Distance Classic Invitational.

Santos was eighth overall in the 800 m at the 2000 Mt. SAC Relays. At New Balance meetings in Dedham, Massachusetts, and Brunswick, Maine, in late June and early July, Santos placed 30th, 12th and 20th in 800 m races. He ended his season at the Brazilian Athletics Championships, running 1:51.26 in the 800 m semi-finals.

== Personal life ==
Santos was born on 16 December 1970. He is from Campinas, São Paulo, Brazil. He attended Cuyamaca College in Rancho San Diego, California.

Santos was a fan of the Chicago Bulls in the NBA, putting him in contrast with his training group who were Los Angeles Lakers fans.
