= Namibia at the 1994 Commonwealth Games =

- Flag of Namibia
- CGF code: NAM
- CGA: Namibia National Olympic Committee
- Website: olympic.org.na

in Victoria, British Columbia, Canada August 18, 1994 – August 28, 1994
- Medals Ranked 18th: Gold 1 Silver 0 Bronze 1 Total 2

Commonwealth Games appearances (overview)
- 1994; 1998; 2002; 2006; 2010; 2014; 2018; 2022; 2026; 2030

Namibia competed at the 1994 Commonwealth Games in Victoria, British Columbia, Canada between August 18 and 28, 1994. It was Namibia's first appearance at the Games.

== Medalists ==
Medal	Name	Sport	Event	Date
Gold	Frankie Fredericks	Athletics	Men's 200 metres	August 26
Bronze	Frankie Fredericks	Athletics	Men's 100 metres	August 23

== Competitors ==
The following is the list of number of competitors (per gender) participating at the games per sport/discipline:

Sport	Men	Women	Total
Athletics	7	1	8
Badminton	—	—	—
Boxing	—	—	—
Cycling	—	—	—
Diving	—	—	—
Gymnastics	—	—	—
Lawn bowls	5	4	9
Shooting	—	—	—
Swimming	—	—	—
Weightlifting	—	—	—
Wrestling	—	—	—
Total	12	5	17
