= Abednego Matilu =

Kenyan sprinter (born 1968)

Personal information
- Nationality: Kenyan
- Born: 21 November 1968 (age 57)
- Height: 1.75 m (5 ft 9 in)
- Weight: 73 kg (161 lb)

Sport
- Sport: Athletics
- Event: 400 metres

Abednego Matilu (born 21 November 1968) is a retired Kenyan sprinter who specialised in the 400 metres. He represented his country at the 1992 Summer Olympics, as well as three World Championships. He was part of the 4 × 400 metres relay team that won the silver at the 1993 World Championships in Stuttgart.

His personal best in the event is 44.97 seconds set at the 1995 World Championships in Gothenburg.

== Competition record ==
Year	Competition	Venue	Position	Event	Notes
Representing Kenya
1992	Olympic Games	Barcelona, Spain	8th	4 × 400 m relay	DNF
1993	World Championships	Stuttgart, Germany	2nd	4 × 400 m relay	2:59.82
1994	Commonwealth Games	Victoria, Canada	5th (sf)	400 m	45.67
1994	Commonwealth Games	Victoria, Canada	2nd (h)	4 × 400 m relay	3:03.14
1995	World Championships	Gothenburg, Sweden	8th (sf)	400 m	45.41
1995	World Championships	Gothenburg, Sweden	4th (h)	4 × 400 m relay	3:00.81
1998	Commonwealth Games	Kuala Lumpur, Malaysia	12th (sf)	400 m	46.06
1998	Commonwealth Games	Kuala Lumpur, Malaysia	9th (h)	4 × 400 m relay	3:05.56
1999	World Championships	Seville, Spain	41st (h)	400 m	47.42
1999	All-Africa Games	Johannesburg, South Africa	12th (sf)	400 m	46.99
1999	All-Africa Games	Johannesburg, South Africa	3rd	4 × 400 m relay	3:01.73
