= Judex Lefou =

Mauritian hurdler

Personal information
- Born: 24 June 1966 (age 60)

Sport
- Sport: Track and field
Medal record
Representing Mauritius
African Championships
Gold medal – first place	1992 Belle Vue Harel	110 m hurdles
Bronze medal – third place	1990 Cairo	110 m hurdles
Bronze medal – third place	1990 Cairo	400 m hurdles
Bronze medal – third place	1996 Yaoundé	110 m hurdles
All-Africa Games
Gold medal – first place	1987 Nairobi	110m hurdles
Gold medal – first place	1991 Cairo	110m hurdles

Pierre Judex Lefou (born 24 June 1966) is a Mauritian former hurdler who competed in the 1988 Summer Olympics, in the 1992 Summer Olympics, and in the 1996 Summer Olympics.

== International competitions ==
Year	Competition	Venue	Position	Event	Notes
Representing Mauritius
1987	World Indoor Championships	Indianapolis, United States	16th (h)	60 m hurdles	8.38
1987	World Indoor Championships	Indianapolis, United States	–	High jump	NM
1987	Universiade	Zagreb, Yugoslavia	9th (sf)	110 m hurdles	14.30
1987	Universiade	Zagreb, Yugoslavia	28th (h)	400 m hurdles	54.70
1987	All-Africa Games	Nairobi, Kenya	1st	110 m hurdles	14.11
1987	World Championships	Rome, Italy	31st (h)	110 m hurdles	14.35
1988	Olympic Games	Seoul, South Korea	33rd (h)	110 m hurdles	14.73
1989	Jeux de la Francophonie	Casablanca, Morocco	3rd	110 m hurdles	14.06
1990	African Championships	Cairo, Egypt	3rd	110 m hurdles	14.42
1990	African Championships	Cairo, Egypt	3rd	400 m hurdles	51.41
1991	Universiade	Sheffield, United Kingdom	8th (sf)	110 m hurdles	14.07
1991	Universiade	Sheffield, United Kingdom	9th (h)	4 × 400 m relay	3:13.99
1991	World Championships	Tokyo, Japan	32nd (h)	110 m hurdles	14.26
1991	All-Africa Games	Cairo, Egypt	1st	110 m hurdles	14.12
1992	African Championships	Belle Vue Maurel, Mauritius	1st	110 m hurdles	13.91
1992	Olympic Games	Barcelona, Spain	35th (h)	110 m hurdles	14.45
1994	Jeux de la Francophonie	Bondoufle, France	6th	400 m hurdles	51.12
1994	Jeux de la Francophonie	Bondoufle, France	4th	4 × 400 m relay	3:09.88
1994	Commonwealth Games	Victoria, Canada	15th (h)	400 m hurdles	52.35
1994	Commonwealth Games	Victoria, Canada	11th (h)	4 × 400 m relay	3:11.48
1995	World Championships	Gothenburg, Sweden	39th (h)	400 m hurdles	51.46
1996	African Championships	Yaoundé, Cameroon	3rd	110 m hurdles	13.9
1996	Olympic Games	Atlanta, United States	60th (h)	110 m hurdles	14.69
