= Peter Crampton (athlete) =

British athlete (born 1969)

Personal information
- Nationality: British (English)
- Born: 4 June 1969 (age 57) Grimsby, Lincolnshire, England
- Height: 194 cm (6 ft 4 in)
- Weight: 85 kg (187 lb)

Sport
- Sport: Athletics
- Event: 400m / hurdles
- Club: Spenborough AC
Medal record
Athletics
Representing England
Commonwealth Games
Gold medal – first place	1994 Victoria	4 x 400m relay

Peter Crampton (born 4 June 1969) is a male former British athlete who competed at the 1996 Summer Olympics.

== Biography ==
Crampton, born in Grimsby, represented England and won the gold medal in the 4 x 400 metres relay at the 1994 Commonwealth Games held in Victoria, British Columbia, Canada, along with teammates, David McKenzie, Adrian Patrick, and Du'aine Ladejo and heat runners Alex Fugallo and Mark Smith. He also competed in the 400 metres hurdles event.

He represented Great Britain in the 400 metres hurdles at the 1996 Olympic Games in Atlanta.

Crampton became the British 400 metres hurdles champion after winning the British AAA Championships title at the 1994 AAA Championships.
