= 1994 European Athletics Championships – Men's 4 × 400 metres relay =

Men's 4 × 400 metres relay at the European Athletics Championships

The men's 4 × 400 metres relay event at the 1994 European Athletics Championships was held in Helsinki, Finland, at Helsinki Olympic Stadium on 14 August 1994.

== Medalists ==
Gold	David McKenzie; Brian Whittle; Roger Black; Du'aine Thorne-Ladejo; United Kingdom
Silver	Pierre-Marie Hilaire; Jean-Louis Rapnouil; Jacques Farraudière; Stéphane Diagana; France
Bronze	Mikhail Vdovin; Dmitriy Kosov; Dmitriy Bey; Dmitriy Golovastov; Russia

== Results ==
=== Final ===
14 August

Rank	Nation	Competitors	Time	Notes
1st place, gold medalist(s)	United Kingdom	David McKenzie; Brian Whittle; Roger Black; Du'aine Thorne-Ladejo	2:59.13	
2nd place, silver medalist(s)	France	Pierre-Marie Hilaire; Jean-Louis Rapnouil; Jacques Farraudière; Stéphane Diagana	3:01.11	
3rd place, bronze medalist(s)	Russia	Mikhail Vdovin; Dmitriy Kosov; Dmitriy Bey; Dmitriy Golovastov	3:03.10	
4	Italy	Marco Vaccari; Fabio Grossi; Ashraf Saber; Alessandro Aimar	3:03.46	
5	Germany	Daniel Bittner; Kai Karsten; Lutz Becker; Edgar Itt	3:04.15	
6	Poland	Piotr Rysiukiewicz; Robert Maćkowiak; Piotr Kotlarski; Tomasz Czubak	3:04.22	
7	Finland	Ari Pinomäki; Ilkka Yli-Tuomi; Kari Louramo; Vesa-Pekka Pihlavisto	3:04.55	

== Participation ==
According to an unofficial count, 28 athletes from 7 countries participated in the event.

- Finland (4)
- France (4)
- Germany (4)
- Italy (4)
- Poland (4)
- Russia (4)
- United Kingdom (4)
