= Athletics at the 1995 Pan American Games – Men's 800 metres =

Men's 800 metres at the Pan American Games

The men's 800 metres event at the 1995 Pan American Games was held at the Estadio Atletico "Justo Roman" on 22 and 23 March.

== Medalists ==
Gold	Silver	Bronze
José Luíz Barbosa; Brazil	Alain Miranda; Cuba	Brad Sumner; United States

== Results ==
=== Heats ===
Rank	Heat	Name	Nationality	Time	Notes
1	2	José Luíz Barbosa	Brazil	1:46.29	Q, GR
2	1	Alain Miranda	Cuba	1:47.93	Q
3	1	Gilmar Santos	Brazil	1:47.96	Q
4	1	Byron Goodwin	Canada	1:48.42	Q
5	1	Víctor Matarrese	Argentina	1:48.77	q
6	1	Terril Davis	United States	1:48.97	q
7	2	Brad Sumner	United States	1:49.23	Q
8	2	Daryl Fillion	Canada	1:49.84	Q
9	2	Javier Soto	Puerto Rico	1:50.15	
10	2	Juan Alejandro Torres	Argentina	1:50.37	
11	1	Tommy Asinga	Suriname	1:50.72	
12	2	Porfirio Méndez	Paraguay	1:50.96	
13	1	Frank Edwards	Dominica	1:54.70	
14	2	Ian Godwin	Saint Kitts and Nevis	1:56.36	

=== Final ===
Rank	Name	Nationality	Time	Notes
1st place, gold medalist(s)	José Luíz Barbosa	Brazil	1:46.02	GR
2nd place, silver medalist(s)	Alain Miranda	Cuba	1:46.88	
3rd place, bronze medalist(s)	Brad Sumner	United States	1:47.58	
4	Gilmar Santos	Brazil	1:47.85	
5	Byron Goodwin	Canada	1:47.92	
6	Daryl Fillion	Canada	1:48.79	
7	Víctor Matarrese	Argentina	1:49.91	
8	Terril Davis	United States	1:51.21	
