= Emma Tattam =

Personal information
- Nationality: England
- Born: 1973 (age 51–52) Reading, Berkshire

Sport
- Sport: Swimming
- Club: Portsmouth Northsea

Emma Tattam is a female former swimmer who competed for England.

== Swimming career ==
Tattam was the British champion over 100 metres backstroke in 1994. She represented England in the backstroke events, at the 1994 Commonwealth Games in Victoria, British Columbia, Canada.

She swan for the Portsmouth Northsea Swimming Club.
