= Paul Greene & The Other Colours =

Paul Greene & the Other Colours
- Origin: Australia
- Genre: Roots
- Labels: ABC Music, Whirl Records
- Members: Neil Beaver; Paul Greene; Mick Laws
- Past members: Ellie Plummer; Matt Sykes

Paul Greene & the Other Colours is an Australian roots band fronted by Paul Greene. Their album Behind The Stars was nominated for a 2012 ARIA Award for Best Blues & Roots Album. Previously a solo artist Paul Greene now works with a backing band the Other Colours.

Greene is a former athlete. He was a sprinter who competed at the 1996 Olympics. Through the Olympic Record CD project he started working with Rob Hirst and Rick Grossman, joining their band Ghostwriters and working with Hirst on two albums. He also established a solo career, gaining national airplay on Triple J. Greene also fronts a reformation of Spy vs Spy.

== Band members ==
=== Members ===
- Neil Beaver
- Paul Greene
- Eleanor Plummer

=== Former members ===
- Ellie Plummer
- Matt Sykes

== Discography ==
=== Albums ===
Title	Details
The Miles	Released: 2001; Label: Paul Greene (PG001); Format: CD
This Way	Released: 2002; Label: Paul Greene (PG002); Format: CD
Happy Here With You	Released: 2004; Label: Paul Greene (PG004); Format: CD
In the Stealth of Summer (as Hirst & Greene)	Released: March 2005; Label: ABC Roots Music (14182); Format: CD, CD+DVD, digital download
Red Shelf Sessions Volume 1	Released: 2005; Label: Red Shelf; Format: CD, digital download
Reset	Released: 2005; Label: Acmec Records (ACMEC060); Format: CD, digital download
Distance Over Time	Released: 2008; Label: Compass Bros. (047CDCB); Format: CD, digital download
Red Shelf Sessions Volume 2	Released: 2009; Label: Red Shelf; Format: CD, digital download
Everywhere Is Home	Released: 2010; Label: Paul Greene (PG008); Format: CD, digital download
Behind the Stars (as Paul Greene and The Other Colours)	Released: April 2012; Label: ABC Music (2799338); Format: CD, digital download
One Lap of the Sun (as Paul Greene and The Other Colours)	Released: September 2014; Label: Universal Music Australia (3773532); Format: CD, digital download

== Awards and nominations ==
=== ARIA Music Awards ===
The ARIA Music Awards is an annual awards ceremony that recognises excellence, innovation, and achievement across all genres of Australian music.

Year	Nominee / work	Award	Result
2012	Behind the Stars	Best Blues and Roots Album	Nominated
