= England at the 1994 Commonwealth Games =

- CGF code: ENG
- CGA: Commonwealth Games England
- Website: weareengland.org

in Victoria, British Columbia, Canada
- Competitors: 259
- Flag bearers: Neil Thomas (Opening); Gillian Clark (Closing)
- Officials: 76
- Medals Ranked 3rd: Gold 30 Silver 45 Bronze 51 Total 126

Commonwealth Games appearances (overview)
- 1930; 1934; 1938; 1950; 1954; 1958; 1962; 1966; 1970; 1974; 1978; 1982; 1986; 1990; 1994; 1998; 2002; 2006; 2010; 2014; 2018; 2022; 2026; 2030

England competed at the 1994 Commonwealth Games in Victoria, British Columbia, Canada, between 18 and 28 August 1994.

England were represented by the Commonwealth Games Council for England (CGCE). England joined the Commonwealth of Nations as part of the United Kingdom in 1931.

England finished third in the medal table behind Australia and Canada, with 31 gold medals, 47 silver medals and 51 bronze medals.

== Medal table (top three) ==
Rank	Nation	Gold	Silver	Bronze	Total
1	Australia	89	53	44	186
2	Canada	42	43	49	134
3	England	31	47	51	129
Totals (3 entries)		162	143	144	449

== Athletes and medals ==
The athletes that competed are listed below.

=== Athletics ===
Name	Event/s	Medal/s
Francis Agyepong	triple jump	
Jacqui Agyepong	100m hurdles	1 x silver
Sharon Andrews	discus	
Andy Ashurst	pole vault	
Myrtle Augee	shot put	1 x silver
Steve Backley	javelin	1 x gold
Julia Bennett	high jump	
Sandra Bowyer	800m	
Toby Box	200m, 4 × 100 m relay	1 x bronze
Jon Brown	5,000m	
Kevin Brown	discus	
Nick Buckfield	pole vault	
Thomas Buckner	3,000m steeplechase	
David Buzza	marathon	
Gary Cadogan	400m hurdles	
Debbie Callaway	discus	
Linford Christie	100m	1 x gold
Steve Coupland	400m hurdles	
Clova Court	100m hurdles, heptathlon	
Lloyd Cowan	110m hurdles	
Peter Crampton	400m hurdles, 4 × 400 m relay	1 x gold
Yvonne Danson	marathon	1 x bronze
Rob Denmark	5,000m	1 x gold
Sandra Douglas	400m	
Stephi Douglas	100m, 200m, 4 × 100 m relay	1 x bronze
Spencer Duval	3,000m steeplechase	
Sally Eastall	marathon	
Mark Easton	30 km walk	
Jonathan Edwards	triple jump	1 x silver
Mike Edwards	pole vault	
Sally Ellis	marathon	
Samantha Farquharson	100m hurdles	
Alex Fugallo +	400m, 4 × 400 m relay	1 x gold
Dawn Gandy	800m	
Lynn Gibson	1,500m	
Sharon Gibson	javelin	1 x bronze
Tracy Goddard	200m, 4 × 400 m relay	1 x gold
Philip Goedluck	4 × 100 m relay	1 x bronze
Julian Golley	triple jump	1 x gold
Dalton Grant	high jump	
Sally Gunnell	400m hurdles, 4 × 400 m relay	2 x gold
Lea Haggett	high jump	
Paul Head	hammer	1 x silver
Mick Hill	javelin	1 x silver
David Holding	800m wheelchair	1 x silver
Kelly Holmes	1,500m	1 x gold
Mark Hudspith	marathon	1 x bronze
Angie Hulley	10,000m	
Zahara Hyde	10,000m	
Oluyinka Idowu	long jump	1 x silver
Simmone Jacobs	100m, 4 × 100 m relay	1 x bronze
Tony Jarrett	110m hurdles	1 x silver
Jason John	100m, 4 × 100 m relay	1 x bronze
Martin Jones	10,000m	
Mick Jones	hammer	
Rafer Joseph	decathlon	
Lisa Kehler	10 km walk	
Andy Keith	1,500m	
Jennifer Kelly	heptathlon	
Linda Keough	4 × 400 m relay	1 x gold
Alex Kruger	decathlon	
Du'aine Ladejo	400m, 4 × 400 m relay	1 x gold, 1 x silver
Denise Lewis	heptathlon, long jump	1 x gold
Andrew Lill	800m	
Vicky Lupton	10 km walk	
Maggie Lynes	shot put	
Chris Maddocks	30 km walk	
Debbie Marti	high jump	1 x bronze
Eamonn Martin	10,000m	
John Mayock	1,500m	1 x bronze
Sonia McGeorge	3,000m	
Kevin McKay	1,500m	
David McKenzie	400m, 4 × 400 m relay	1 x gold
Geraldine McLeod	200m, 4 × 100 m relay	1 x bronze
Diane Modahl	800m	
Elizabeth Mongudhi	3,000m	
Colin Moore	marathon	
Ivan Newman	marathon wheelchair	1 x silver
John Nuttall	5,000m	1 x bronze
Judy Oakes	shot put	1 x gold
Jacqui Parker	400m hurdles	
Adrian Patrick	4 × 400 m relay	1 x gold
John Regis	200m	1 x silver
Brendan Reilly	high jump	
Gowry Retchakan	400m hurdles	
Suzanne Rigg	10,000m	
Mark Roberson	javelin	
Fred Salle	long jump	
Lorraine Shaw	discus	
Simon Shirley	decathlon	1 x bronze
Matt Simson	shot put	1 x gold
Glen Smith	discus	
Karen Smith	10 km walk	
Mark Smith +	4 × 100 m relay, 4 × 400 m relay	1 x gold, 1 x bronze
Phylis Smith	200m, 4 × 400 m relay	1 x gold
Steve Smith	high jump	1 x silver
Nigel Spratley	shot put	
Martin Steele	800m	
Darrell Stone	30 km walk	
Paula Thomas	100m, 200m, 4 × 100 m relay	2 x bronze
Andrew Tulloch	110m hurdles	
Peter Vivian	hammer	1 x bronze
Colin Walker	3,000m steeplechase	
Robert Weir	discus	1 x bronze
Ann Williams	1,500m	
Barrington Williams	long jump	
Terry Williams	100m, 200m, 4 × 100 m relay	1 x bronze
Craig Winrow	800m	
Alison Wyeth	3,000m	1 x bronze

+ heat competitor of the gold winning 4x400 team

=== Badminton ===
Name	Event/s	Medal/s
Simon Archer	doubles, mixed doubles, mixed team	1 x gold, 2 x silver
Julie Bradbury	doubles, mixed doubles, mixed team	1 x gold, 2 x silver
Gillian Clark	doubles, mixed doubles, mixed team	2 x gold, 1 x silver
Chris Hunt	doubles, mixed doubles, mixed team	2 x gold, 1 x silver
Peter Knowles	singles, doubles, mixed team	1 x gold
Suzanne Louis-Lane	singles, mixed team	1 x gold
Joanne Muggeridge	singles, doubles, mixed team	2 x gold
Anders Nielsen	singles, mixed team	1 x gold, 1 x bronze
Nick Ponting	doubles, mixed doubles, mixed team	1 x gold, 1 x bronze
Joanne Wright	doubles, mixed doubles, mixed team	2 x gold, 1 x bronze

=== Boxing ===
Name	Event/s	Medal/s
Paul Burns	67 kg welterweight	
Danny Costello	51 kg flyweight	1 x bronze
Andy Green	60 kg lightweight	
Kelly Oliver	81 kg light-heavyweight	
Spencer Oliver	54 kg bantamweight	1 x silver
Dean Pithie	57 kg featherweight	
Peter Richardson	63.5 kg light-welterweight	1 x gold
Danny Williams	over 91 kg super-heavyweight	1 x bronze

=== Cycling ===
Men

Name	Event/s	Medal/s
Stuart Dangerfield	4,000m pursuit	
Tony Doyle	points race, team pursuit	1 x silver
Malcolm Elliott	road race	
Rob Hayles	1 km time trial, team pursuit	1 x silver
Simeon Hempsall	road race	
Gary Hibbert	match sprint	
Matt Illingworth	team time trial	1 x silver
Paul Jennings	points race, scratch race, team time trial	1 x silver
Simon Lillistone	scratch race, points race, team time trial	1 x silver
Chris Lillywhite	road race	
Peter Longbottom	team time trial	1 x silver
Chris Newton	team pursuit	1 x silver
Jeff Snodin	scratch race	
Bryan Steel	4,000m pursuit, team pursuit	1 x silver
Shaun Wallace	4,000m pursuit	1 x silver
Mark Walsham	road race	

Women

Name	Event/s	Medal/s
Wendy Everson	match sprint	
Julia Freeman	road race, team time trial	1 x bronze
Maxine Johnson	points race, road race, team time trial	1 x bronze
Maria Lawrence	points race, road race, team time trial	1 x bronze
Yvonne McGregor	3,000m pursuit, points race, road race, team time trial	1 x gold, 1 x bronze

=== Diving ===
Name	Event/s	Medal/s
Hayley Allen	10m platform	
Tony Ally	1m & 3m springboard, 10m platform	
Sally Freeman	10m platform	
Susan Ryan	1m springboard	
Mark Shipman	1m & 3m springboard, 10m platform	
Jane Smith	1m & 3m springboard	
Victoria Stenning	1m & 3m springboard	
Lesley Ward	10m platform	

=== Gymnastics ===
Name	Event/s	Medal/s
Robert Barber	all-around, team, horizontal bar	1 x bronze
Paul Bowler	team	1 x bronze
Jackie Brady	all-around, team, floor, uneven bars	1 x gold, 1 x silver
Zita Lusack	all-around, team, beam, uneven bars, vault	1 x gold, 1 x silver, 1 x bronze
Lee McDermott	all-around, rings, floor, team, parallel bars, pommel, vault	1 x gold, 1 x bronze
Aicha McKenzie	all-around, ball, hoop, ribbon, team	3 x bronze
Annika Reeder	team, floor	2 x gold
Debbie Southwick	all-around, ball, hoop, ribbon, team	2 x bronze
Linda Southwick	team	1 x bronze
Karin Szymko	all-around, team, beam, vault	1 x gold
Neil Thomas	all-around, floor, team, vault, horizontal bar, parallel bars, pommel	2 x gold, 2 x bronze

=== Lawn bowls ===
Name	Event/s	Medal/s
Tony Allcock	singles	1 x silver
Catherine Anton	fours	
Brenda Atherton	pairs	1 x bronze
Jean Baker	fours	
John Bell	fours	
Roy Cutts	fours	
Wendy Line	fours	
Mary Price	pairs	1 x bronze
John Rednall	fours	
Wynne Richards	fours	
Jayne Roylance	fours	
Norma Shaw	singles	1 x bronze
Gary Smith	pairs	1 x bronze
Andy Thomson	pairs	1 x bronze

=== Shooting ===
Name	Event/s	Medal/s
Andy Austin	skeet & pairs	1 x bronze
Glyn Barnett	full bore rifle & pairs	1 x silver, 1 x bronze
Bob Borsley	trap & pairs	1 x bronze
David Chapman	running target	
Peter Clark	rapid fire pistol & pairs	
Jim Cornish	rifle prone & pairs	1 x silver
Raymond Duckworth	centre fire pistol & pairs	
Nigel Freeland	air pistol & pairs, rapid fire pistol & pairs	
Mick Gault	free pistol & pairs, centre-fire pistol & pairs	1 x gold, 1 x silver, 1 x bronze
John Grice	trap & pairs	1 x bronze
Ken Harman	skeet & pairs	
Jacqueline Hay	rifle prone & pairs	
Stephen Haynes	air pistol & pairs	
Chris Hector	air rifle & pairs, rifle 3pos & pairs	1 x gold, 1 x silver, 1 x bronze
Trevor Langridge	rifle 3pos & pairs	1 x bronze
Paul Leatherdale	free pistol & pairs	1 x bronze
Tony Lincoln	rifle prone & pairs	
Louise Minett	air rifle & pairs	1 x silver
Karen Morton	rifle 3pos & pairs, air rifle & pairs	2 x silver
Carol Page	sport pistol & pairs, air pistol & pairs	2 x bronze
Antony Ringer	full bore rifle & pairs	1 x silver
Margaret Thomas	sport pistol & pairs, air pistol & pairs	1 x silver, 2 x bronze
Lindsay Volpin	rifle 3pos & pairs, rifle prone & pairs	1 x silver
Nigel Wallace	air rifle & pairs	1 x silver, 1 x bronze

=== Swimming ===
Name	Event/s	Medal/s
Alex Bennett	100/200m butterfly, 100/200m free, freestyle & medley relays	1 x gold, 2 x silver
Claire Bishop	100m freestyle S9	1 x silver
Alexander Clapper	100/200m breaststroke	
Andrew Clayton	200m freestyle, 4x100/200 free relays	2 x bronze
Kevin Crosby	100/200m butterfly	
Joanne Deakins	200m backstroke	
Mike Fibbens	50/100m free, 4x100 freestyle relay	1 x bronze
Mark Foster	50/100m freestyle, 4 × 100 m free relay	1 x gold, 1 x bronze
Nick Gillingham	100/200m breaststroke	1 x gold, 1 x silver
Katie Goddard	400m freestyle	
Sarah Hardcastle	400/800m freestyle, 4 × 200 m freestyle relay	1 x silver, 1 x bronze
Marie Hardiman	100/200m breaststroke, 4x200 medley relay	1 x silver
Martin Harris	100m backstroke	1 x gold
James Hickman	100/200m butterfly	1 x bronze
Vicky Horner	200/400m freestyle	
Claire Huddart	200m freestyle, freestyle relays	1 x gold, 1 x silver
Jaime King	100/200m breaststroke	
Steven Mellor	200/400m freestyle	1 x bronze
Matthew O'Connor	100/200m backstroke	
Kathy Osher	100/200m backstroke, 4x200 medley relay	1 x silver, 1 x bronze
James Parrack	100m breaststroke	
Karen Pickering	100/200m freestyle, freestyle & medley relays	2 x gold, 2 x silver, 1 x bronze
Sue Rolph	50/100m free, 200m medley, 4 × 100 m freestyle relay	1 x gold
Adam Ruckwood	100/200m backstroke	1 x gold, 1 x bronze
James Salter	200m freestyle, 4 × 200 m freestyle relay	1 x bronze
Nicholas Shackell	50/100m free, 4x100/200 free relays	2 x bronze
Helen Slatter	100m backstroke, 100/200m butterfly, 200/400m medley	
Emma Tattam	100/200m backstroke	
Nicole Thornley	100/200m breaststroke	
Ian Wilson	1,500 freestyle	

=== Synchronised swimming ===
Name	Event/s	Medal/s
Kerry Shacklock	solo, duet	2 x silver
Laila Vakil	solo, duet	1 x silver

=== Weightlifting ===
Name	Event/s	Medal/s
Anthony Arthur	middleweight 76 kg, snatch, clean & jerk, overall	
Andy Callard	sub-heavyweight 99 kg, snatch, clean & jerk, overall	2 x gold
Stewart Cruickshank	lightweight 70 kg, snatch, clean & jerk, overall	1 x silver, 2 x bronze
Ben Devonshire	bantamweight 59 kg, snatch, clean & jerk, overall	1 x bronze
Giles Greenwood	super-heavyweight +108 kg, snatch, clean & jerk, overall	
Leon Griffin	lightweight 70 kg, snatch, clean & jerk, overall	
Andrew Littler	middleweight 76 kg, snatch, clean & jerk, overall	
Jonathan Lubin	featherweight 64 kg, snatch, clean & jerk, overall	
Peter May	middle-heavyweight 91 kg, snatch, clean & jerk, overall	
Stephen Ward	light-heavyweight 83 kg, snatch, clean & jerk, overall	3 x silver

=== Wrestling ===
Name	Event/s	Medal/s
Brian Aspen	lightweight 68 kg	
Andrew Hutchinson	flyweight 52 kg	1 x silver
Noel Loban	heavyweight 100 kg	1 x silver
John Melling	featherweight 62 kg	1 x silver
Shaun Morley	middleweight 82 kg	
Joseph Mossford	light-heavyweight 90 kg	
Shane Rigby	welterweight 74 kg	
Amarjit Singh	super-heavyweight +100 kg	1 x bronze
