= Uwe Jahn (sprinter) =

German sprinter (born 1971)

Personal information
- Full name: Uwe Jahn
- Born: 4 April 1971 (age 55)
- Height: 1.81 m (5 ft 11 in)

Sport
- Country: Germany
- Sport: Athletics
- Event: 400 metres

Achievements and titles
- Personal best(s): 400 m: 45.64 (Madrid, June 1996)

Uwe Jahn (born 4 April 1971) is a former German sprinter who specialised in the 400 metres.

A four-time German Athletics Champion, Jahn's team was disqualified from the 1995 World Championships in Athletics – Men's 4 × 400 metres relay final. The following year, he was only a stand-by athlete for Germany at the 1996 Summer Olympics.

== Achievements ==
Year	Competition	Venue	Position	Event	Notes
Representing Germany
1995	German Championships	Bremen, Germany	1st	400 m	45.95, SB
1995	German Championships	Bremen, Germany	1st	4 × 400 m relay	3:03.04, CR
1995	World Championships	Gothenburg, Sweden	—	4 × 400 m relay	DSQ
1996	German Championships	Cologne, Germany	1st	400 m	45.86
1996	German Championships	Cologne, Germany	1st	4 × 400 m relay	3:05.14
