= Désiré Pierre-Louis =

Mauritian sprinter

Personal information
- Nationality: Mauritian
- Born: 5 March 1973 (age 53)

Sport
- Sport: Sprinting
- Event: 4 × 400 metres relay
Medal record
Men's athletics
Representing Mauritius
Francophone Games
Bronze medal – third place	1994 Bondoufle	400 m

Désiré Pierre-Louis (born 5 March 1973) is a Mauritian sprinter and middle-distance runner. He competed in the men's 4 × 400 metres relay at the 1996 Summer Olympics.

== Career ==
Pierre-Louis won four Mauritian Athletics Championships titles, in both the 400 m and 800 m in 1991 and 1993. In 1994, he won a bronze medal in the 400 m at the Francophone Games and qualified for the 1994 Commonwealth Games, where he advanced to the 400 m quarter-finals but failed to qualify past the first round of the 4 × 400 m relay.

The following year, Pierre-Louis qualified for the 1995 indoor and outdoor world championship 400 m races, failing to advance past the first round in both events.

Pierre-Louis was competing in NJCAA events for Blinn College in Brenham, Texas, when he qualified for the 1996 Summer Olympics. At the 1996 Olympics, Pierre-Louis ran second leg for the Mauritian 4 × 400 m team which ran 3:08.17, finishing fourth in their heat and one spot away from advancing to the semi-finals.

Following the Olympics, Pierre-Louis was recruited to Oklahoma Baptist University where he competed for the Oklahoma Baptist Bison in the NAIA. He was a twelve-time All-American for the team before graduating in 1998.

He won the 1997 and 1998 600 meters at the NAIA men's indoor track and field championship, setting an NAIA record of 1:18.25 at the 1998 championships. He also was a member of Oklahoma Baptist's winning 4 × 400 meters relay team at the 1997 and 1998 NAIA men's outdoor track and field championship.

== Personal life ==
Pierre-Louis was born in Mauritius. He lives in Tulsa, Oklahoma and works as a banker.
