= Linval Laird =

Jamaican sprinter (born 1969)

Personal information
- Born: 23 June 1969 (age 57)

Sport
- Sport: Track and field
Medal record
Representing Jamaica
World Indoor Championships
Silver medal – second place	1997 Paris	4x400 m relay
Summer Universiade
Silver medal – second place	1991 Sheffield	4x400 m relay
Silver medal – second place	1997 Catania	4x400 m relay
Bronze medal – third place	1997 Catania	400 m
Commonwealth Games
Silver medal – second place	1994 Victoria	4x400 m relay

Linval Laird (born 23 June 1969) is a retired Jamaican athlete who specialised in the 400 metres. He won several medals with the Jamaican 4 × 400 metres relay including the silver at the 1997 World Indoor Championships. His biggest individual achievement is the bronze at the 1997 Summer Universiade.

He has personal bests of 45.49 seconds outdoors (San Juan 1997) and 46.61 seconds indoors (Boston 1994).

== Competition record ==
Year	Competition	Venue	Position	Event	Notes
Representing Jamaica
1991	Universiade	Sheffield, United Kingdom	4th (h)	4 × 100 m relay	40.01
1991	Universiade	Sheffield, United Kingdom	2nd	4 × 400 m relay	3:05.93
1994	Commonwealth Games	Victoria, Canada	23rd (qf)	400 m	47.21
1994	Commonwealth Games	Victoria, Canada	2nd	4 × 400 m relay	3:02.32
1995	Universiade	Fukuoka, Japan	19th (qf)	400 m	47.05
1995	Universiade	Fukuoka, Japan	5th	4 × 400 m relay	3:04.77
1997	World Indoor Championships	Paris, France	12th (sf)	400 m	47.01
1997	World Indoor Championships	Paris, France	2nd	4 × 400 m relay	3:08.11
1997	Central American and Caribbean Championships	San Juan, Puerto Rico	2nd	400 m	45.49
1997	Central American and Caribbean Championships	San Juan, Puerto Rico	1st	4 × 400 m relay	3:01.42
1997	World Championships	Athens, Greece	2nd (h)	4 × 400 m relay	2:59.98
1997	Universiade	Catania, Italy	3rd	400 m	45.54
1997	Universiade	Catania, Italy	2nd	4 × 400 m relay	3:02.68
1999	World Indoor Championships	Maebashi, Japan	4th	4 × 400 m relay	3:05.13
