= 1996 German Athletics Championships =

- Dates: 21–23 June 1996
- Host city: Cologne, Germany
- Records set: 4 Championship Records

The 1996 German Athletics Championships were held in Cologne on 21–23 June 1996.

== Results ==
=== Men ===
Event	Gold	
100 m	Marc Blume	10.16
200 m	Marc Blume	20.49
400 m	Uwe Jahn	45.86
800 m	Nico Motchebon	1:45.73
1500 m	Dieter Baumann	3:37.36
5000 m	Dieter Baumann	13:28.23
110 m hurdles	Florian Schwarthoff	13.20
400 m hurdles	Steffen Kolb	50.17
3000 m steeplechase	Steffen Brand	8:24.09
Triple jump	Charles Friedek	17.10
Long jump	Dietmar Haaf	7.91
High jump	Wolfgang Kreißig	2.24
Pole vault	Michael Stolle	5.70 =
Shot put	Oliver-Sven Buder	20.53
Discus throw	Lars Riedel	69.02
Hammer throw	Karsten Kobs	78.92
Javelin throw	Raymond Hecht	89.34
4 × 100 m relay	TV Wattenscheid 01 I H. Blume; M. Blume; Huke; Kurnicki	39.22
4 × 400 m relay	LAC Chemnitz I Carlowitz; Lieder; Jahn; Schönlebe	3:05.14

=== Women ===
Event	Gold	
100 m	Melanie Paschke	11.06
200 m	Melanie Paschke	22.64
400 m	Grit Breuer	51.18
800 m	Linda Kisabaka	2:00.94
1500 m	Sylvia Kühnemund	4:09.65
5000 m	Petra Wassiluk	15:42.06
100 m hurdles	Birgit Wolf	13.11
400 m hurdles	Silvia Rieger	54.85
Triple jump	Petra Lobinger	13.89
Long jump	Claudia Gehrhardt	6.66
High jump	Alina Astafei	1.94
Pole vault	Christine Adams	4.15
Shot put	Astrid Kumbernuss	20.58
Discus throw	Ilke Wyludda	67.36
Hammer throw	Inga Beyer	60.36
Javelin throw	Karen Forkel	66.78
4 × 100 m relay	LG Olympia Dortmund I Brodbeck; Knoll; Seidel; Philipp	43.99
4 × 400 m relay	Bayer 04 Leverkusen I Broich; Kadioglu; Feller; Kisabaka	3:33.03
