= David McKenzie (sprinter) =

British sprinter (born 1970)

Personal information
- Nationality: British (English)
- Born: 3 September 1970 (age 56)

Sport
- Sport: Athletics
- Event: 400m
- Club: Shaftesbury Barnet Harriers
Medal record
Men's athletics
Representing Great Britain
European Championships
Gold medal – first place	1994 Helsinki	4×400 m
IAAF World Cup
Gold medal – first place	1994 London	4×400 m
European U23 Championships
Gold medal – first place	1992 Gateshead	4×400 m
Representing England
Commonwealth Games
Gold medal – first place	1994 Victoria	4 × 400 m relay

David Colin McKenzie (born 3 September 1970) is a British former track and field athlete who won the gold medal in the 4 × 400 metres relay at the 1994 Commonwealth Games held in Victoria, British Columbia, Canada, along with teammates, Peter Crampton, Adrian Patrick, and Du'aine Ladejo.

== Biography ==
McKenzie attended Ingram High School in Croydon, South London and trained with Croydon Harriers. On 11 Aug 1985 at Crystal Palace, just one month shy of his fifteenth birthday, he ran a time of 49.97s for the 400 metres, at the time the second-fastest ever time for an under-15 athlete, and as at 2008 was still the third-fastest time.

He reached his all-time peak on 12 June 1994 when he ran 45.47s at Sheffield for Shaftesbury Barnet Harriers. This earned him a solid place in the England team for the 1994 Commonwealth Games in Victoria, British Columbia. At those games he was part of the 4 × 400 metres relay team that took gold (along with Peter Crampton, Adrian Patrick, and Du'aine Ladejo with Mark Smith and Alex Fugallo in earlier rounds).

McKenzie also won a relay gold medal in the 1994 Helsinki European Championship 4 × 400 metres relay team alongside Brian Whittle, Roger Black and Du'aine Ladejo. McKenzie was to also feature in the season ending World Cup at Crystal Palace again winning gold in the 4 × 400 metres relay with teammates Du'aine Ladejo, Jamie Baulch and Roger Black.

He finished third behind Kennedy Ochieng and Ade Mafe at the 1993 AAA Championships.
