= Geraldine McLeod =

English sprinter

Personal information
- Nationality: English
- Born: 24 September 1971 (age 54) Birmingham, West Midlands

Sport
- Sport: Athletics
- Club: Birchfield Harriers AC
Medal record
Athletics
Representing England
Commonwealth Games
Bronze medal – third place	1994 Victoria	4x100m relay

Geraldine Ann McLeod (born 1971), is a female former athlete who competed for England.

== Athletics career ==
McLeod represented England in the 200 metres and won a bronze medal in the 4 x 100 metres event, at the 1994 Commonwealth Games in Victoria, British Columbia, Canada.
