= Dennis Blake =

Jamaican sprinter (born 1970)

Personal information
- Born: 6 September 1970 (age 56) Saint Elizabeth Parish, Jamaica

Achievements and titles
- Personal best: 400: 45.68 (2000)
Medal record
Men's Athletics
Representing Jamaica
Olympic Games
Bronze medal – third place	1996 Atlanta	4x400 m relay
Commonwealth Games
Silver medal – second place	1994 Victoria	4x400 m relay
Pan American Games
Silver medal – second place	1995 Mar del Plata	4x400 m relay
CAC Championships
Silver medal – second place	1993 Cali	400 m
Summer Universiade
Silver medal – second place	1997 Catania	4x400 m relay

Dennis Anthony Blake (born 6 September 1970 in Saint Elizabeth Parish) is a retired male sprinter from Jamaica. He is a two-time Olympian, winning the bronze medal at the 1996 Summer Olympics in Atlanta, Georgia, where he ran in the qualifying heats.

== Career ==
Blake was awarded a two-year scholarship to attend Blinn Junior College, in Texas. Having gained recognition for his athletic performances, he was awarded thirty-nine athletic scholarships to attend universities throughout the United States, including Alabama A&M University, his alma mater. During his track & field career at Alabama A&M University (AAMU), Blake was the recipient of numerous awards and recognition. The nine-time All-American was selected as the "Most Valuable Player" at the Southern Intercollegiate Athletic Conference (SIAC) championship winning the Abbott Award.

Blake competed in the 1992 Summer Olympics in Barcelona, Spain where he was the official Jamaica flag bearer. Blake also claimed a silver medal at the 1995 Pan American Games in Mar del Plata, Argentina in the men's 4x400 metres relay, alongside Orville Taylor, Roxbert Martin, and Michael McDonald. Blake set his personal best in the men's 400 metres (45.68) on 2000-06-18 in Chapel Hill, North Carolina.

In 1996, under the tutelage of AAMU track and field program coach, Walter Tullis, Blake represented Jamaica at the 1996 Summer Olympics in Atlanta, Georgia and won a bronze medal.

== Results ==
Year	Competition	Venue	Position	Event	Notes
Representing Jamaica
1992	Summer Olympics	Barcelona, Spain	8 h4 r2/4	400 m	
1992	Summer Olympics	Barcelona, Spain	AC h3 r1/2	4 × 400	
1995	Pan American Games	Mar del Plata, Argentina	2nd place, silver medalist(s)	4 × 400 m	
1996	Summer Olympics	Atlanta, Georgia	3rd place, bronze medalist(s)	4 × 400 m	

== Recognition ==
- In 2006, he was inducted into the Alabama A&M University Athletics Hall of Fame
- City of Huntsville, Alabama – Resolution No. 96-791
- Resolution of the Madison County Commission
