= Shane Naylor =

Australian sprinter

Personal information
- Born: Shane Anthony Naylor; 3 November 1967 (age 58)

Sport
- Country: Australia
- Sport: Athletics
- Event: Sprinting
Medal record
Commonwealth Games
Silver medal – second place	1994 Victoria	4×100 m

Shane Anthony Naylor (born 3 November 1967) is an Australian former athlete who competed in sprinting events during the 1980s and 1990s. Post athletics, he has been involved in powerlifting and is a world record holder.

== Biography ==
Naylor grew up in the Victorian town of Tatura near Shepparton. He was an under-18 national champion in the 100 metres.

A four-time national 100 metres champion, Naylor won his first title in 1987 as a 19-year old. In 1992 he finished sixth in the final of the IAAF World Cup and only narrowly missed the qualifying standard that year for the Olympics in Barcelona. He represented Australia at two Commonwealth Games, including in 1994 when he claimed a silver medal as part of the 4×100 metres relay team. In 1995 he set his personal best of 10.21 seconds at the national championships in Canberra, which qualified him for the World Championships in Gothenburg later that year.

In February 1997, Naylor joined former AFL player Leon Higgins to play for a Melbourne team in the 1997 Rugby League World Sevens tournament. The Melbourne team failed to win a match.

Naylor's nephew Max Holmes plays in the AFL for Geelong.
