= Dominique Méyépa =

Mauritian sprinter

Personal information
- Nationality: Mauritian
- Born: 13 October 1972 (age 53)

Sport
- Sport: Sprinting
- Event: 4 × 100 metres relay
Medal record
Men's athletics
Representing Mauritius
Indian Ocean Island Games
Gold medal – first place	1993 Victoria	4 × 100 m relay
Silver medal – second place	1993 Victoria	200 m

Dominique Méyépa (born 13 October 1972) is a Mauritian sprinter. He won gold and silver medals at the Indian Ocean Island Games and competed in the men's 4 × 100 metres relay at the 1996 Summer Olympics.

Méyépa represented his country at the 1993 Indian Ocean Island Games, where he ran on the 4 × 100 metres relay to win the gold medal. He also won a silver medal in the individual 200 m at those Games.

He qualified for the 1994 Commonwealth Games in the 100 m, 200 m, and 4 × 400 m. He advanced to the quarter-finals of the 200 m, but did not make the finals. He also qualified for the 200 m and 4 × 100 m at the 1994 Francophone Games, where he was the fastest runner not to make the 200 m semi-finals and helped his Mauritian 4 × 100 m team qualify for the finals, where they finished 8th with Méyépa on the second leg.

Méyépa won the 1995 Seychelles Athletics Federation championships in the 200 m, competing as a foreign national. The following year, he won his own Mauritian Athletics Championships in the 200 m in a time of 21.38 seconds.

At the 1996 Olympics, Méyépa ran 2nd leg on the Mauritius sprint relay team that finished 7th in their heat.

Christian Boda was said to have opened the door for Méyépa's international successes, with Méyépa representing a newer phase of Mauritian athletics.
