= USATF Distance Classic =

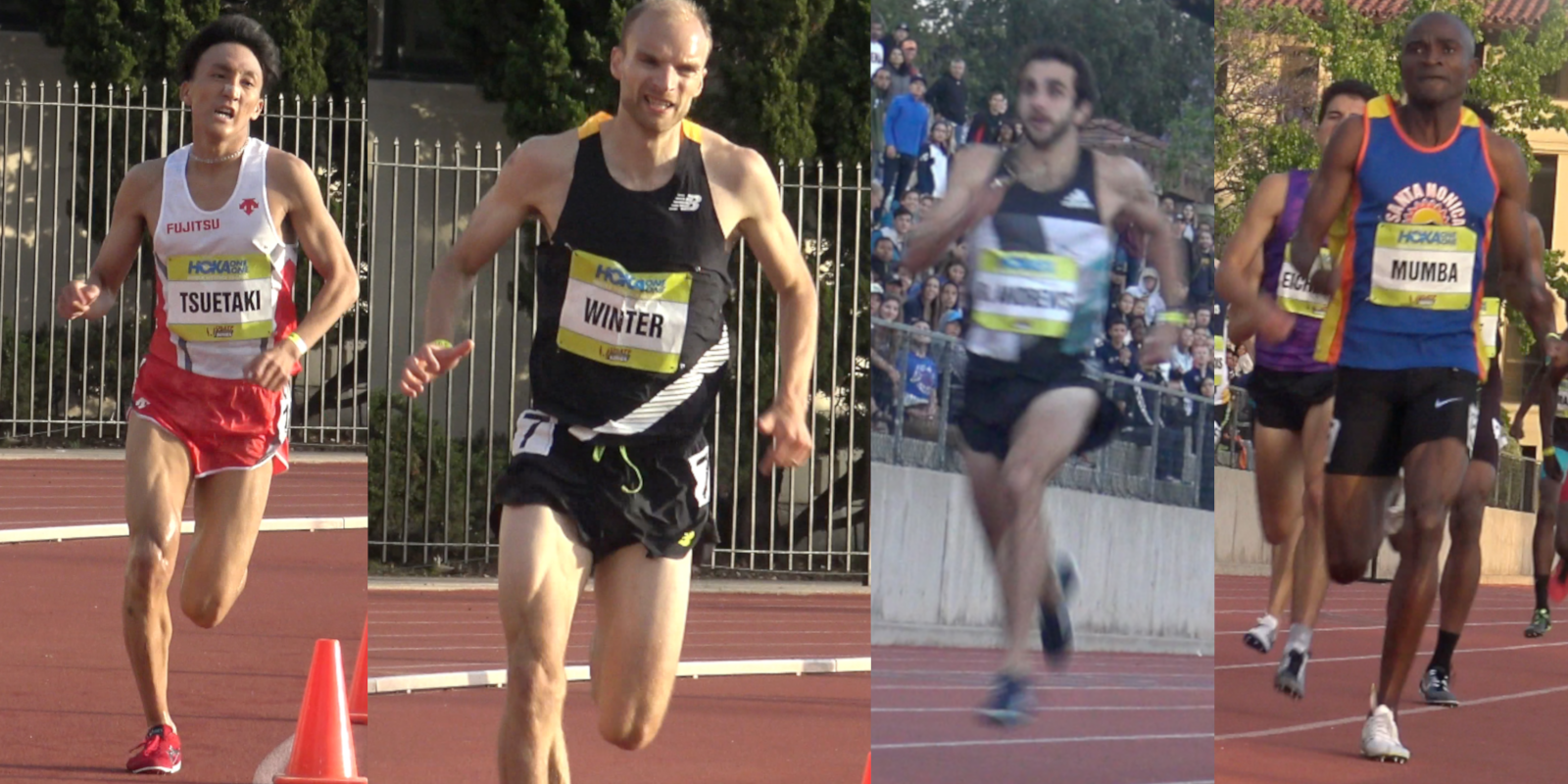
- Competitors at the USATF Distance Classic
- Date: Late May
- Location: Los Angeles, California, at Occidental College's Jack Kemp Stadium
- Event type: Track and field
- Established: 2010 as USATF High Performance Meet
- Website: Oxy Meet History, USATF Meet History

The USATF Distance Classic is an annual track and field meeting in Eagle Rock, Los Angeles, California, hosted at the Occidental College track facility. Before 2015, it was called the USATF High Performance Distance Classic, and in 2015 and 2016 the meet was renamed to the HOKA ONE ONE Middle Distance Classic as per sponsorship from Hoka One One before going back to USATF Distance Classic in 2017. For short, the meet is frequently referred to as just Oxy.

The meet takes place at night to provide ideal conditions for distance running, and it has played host to several Olympians and domestic talents.

== Event records ==
=== Men ===
Men's event records of the USATF Distance Classic
Event	Record	Athlete	Affiliation	Date	Notes
800 m	1:44.71	Cory Primm	Unattached	2011	
1500 m	3:33.41	Matthew Centrowitz Jr.	Nike Oregon Project	2017	
5000 m	13:12.87	Mo Farah	Nike, Inc. Oregon Track Club	2012	
3000 m steeplechase	8:15.26	Evan Jager	Nike, Inc. Bowerman Track Club	2016	

=== Women ===
Women's event records of the USATF Distance Classic
Event	Record	Athlete	Affiliation	Date	Notes
800 m	1:58.78	Brenda Martinez	New Balance	2017	
1500 m	4:04.60	Katie Mackey	Brooks Running	2013	
5000 m	15:05.56	Molly Huddle	Saucony	2013	
3000 m steeplechase	9:37.12	Jaime Cheever	Unattached	2016	
