= Finn Callaghan =

Australian rules footballer (born 2003)

- Callaghan with GWS in 2025

Personal information
- Full name: Finn Callaghan
- Born: 26 April 2003 (age 23)
- Original team: Sandringham Dragons
- Draft: No. 3, 2021 AFL draft
- Debut: Round 5, 2022, Greater Western Sydney vs. Melbourne, at MCG
- Height: 192 cm (6 ft 4 in)
- Weight: 86 kg (190 lb)
- Position: Midfielder

Club information
- Current club: Greater Western Sydney
- Number: 17

Playing career^{1}
Years	Club	Games (Goals)
2022–	Greater Western Sydney	90 (21)
- ^{1} Playing statistics correct to the end of round 22, 2026.

Career highlights
- Brett Kirk Medal: 2025 (game 2)

Finn Callaghan (born 26 April 2003) is a professional Australian rules footballer playing for the Greater Western Sydney Giants in the Australian Football League (AFL).

== Early career ==
Callaghan's father Brett was a 400m runner who competed for Australia at the 1994 Commonwealth Games.

He grew up supporting Western Bulldogs.

He spent his high school years at St Bedes College. He played junior football for Mordialloc-Braeside Junior Football Club. After missing selection in the under-16 Vic Metro side, he had a major growth spurt and added 20 centimetres to his frame. The extra confidence stemming from his height combined with the already developing deadly ball usage created dominant performances early with the Sandringham Dragons, garnering his selection in the Australian Under-18s team.

== AFL career ==
Finn Callaghan was selected by the Greater Western Sydney with pick three in the 2021 AFL draft. The Giants were impressed with his penetrating kicking and aerial ability.

He had a slow start to his career, settling in Sydney in December and dealing with a niggling foot injury in 2021, he spent the pre-season doing rehab. Finally fit, he made his debut against Melbourne in round 5 at the MCG. His foot troubles persisted and required an unusual solution, including having part of a bone removed from his foot He signed a two-year contract extension in February 2023.

In 2023 after finding himself playing on the wing, a series of good performances earned Callaghan the round 7 Rising Star nomination. He had 26 disposals and 10 marks in his teams’ one-point victory over cross-town rivals Sydney. Callaghan then played his first finals series with GWS in 2023 and had an 18 disposal performance against St. Kilda in the 101-77 elimination final win.

Ahead of the 2025 season, it was reported that St Kilda had offered Callaghan $17 million AUD over the duration of a 10 year contract to move to the Saints at the end of the season. However, Callaghan rejected the offer and signed a 4 year contract extension with the Giants, days after the report about the St Kilda offer.

Callaghan won the Brett Kirk Medal in Round 20, 2025.

== Statistics ==
Updated to the end of round 22, 2026.

Legend
G	Goals	K	Kicks	D	Disposals	T	Tackles
B	Behinds	H	Handballs	M	Marks

Season	Team	No.	Games	Totals							Averages (per game)							Votes
Season	Team	No.	Games	G	B	K	H	D	M	T	G	B	K	H	D	M	T	Votes
2022	Greater Western Sydney	17	5	2	0	41	34	75	18	5	0.4	0.0	8.2	6.8	15.0	3.6	1.0	0
2023	Greater Western Sydney	17	21	3	3	208	228	436	97	42	0.1	0.1	9.9	10.9	20.8	4.6	2.0	0
2024	Greater Western Sydney	17	24	2	7	224	326	550	66	86	0.1	0.3	9.3	13.6	22.9	2.8	3.6	6
2025	Greater Western Sydney	17	21	6	9	313	283	596	78	98	0.3	0.4	14.9	13.5	28.4	3.7	4.7	21
2026	Greater Western Sydney	17	19	8	2	254	279	533	57	81	0.4	0.1	13.4	14.7	28.1	3.0	4.3	0
Career			90	21	21	1040	1150	2190	316	312	0.2	0.2	11.6	12.8	24.3	3.5	3.5	27
