= Gideon Biwott =

Kenyan hurdler (born 1964)

Gideon Biwott (born 26 June 1964) is a retired Kenyan athlete who specialized in the 400 metres hurdles.

He won silver medals at the 1994 Commonwealth Games and the 1995 All-Africa Games, the latter in a career best time of 49.19 seconds.

He also competed at the 1996 Olympic Games as well as the World Championships in 1991 and 1993 without reaching the final.
