= Ibrahim Hassan (athlete) =

Ghanaian sprinter and Olympic athlete

Personal information
- Born: 12 February 1971 (age 55)

Sport
- Sport: Track and field
Medal record
Men's athletics
Representing Ghana
African Championships
Silver medal – second place	1993 Durban	400 m
Summer Universiade
Gold medal – first place	1993 Buffalo	400m

Ibrahim Mohamed Hassan (born 12 February 1971) is a Ghanaian former sprinter who competed in the 1996 Summer Olympics.
