= Terry Williams (sprinter) =

Personal information
- Nationality: English
- Born: 15 November 1968 (age 57)

Sport
- Sport: Athletics
- Club: Shaftesbury Barnet AC
Medal record
Athletics
Representing England
Commonwealth Games
| Bronze medal – third place | 1994 Victoria | 4x100m relay |

Terry Williams (born 1968), is a male former athlete who competed for England.

== Athletics career ==
Williams represented England in the 100 and 200 metres and won a bronze medal in the 4 x 100 metres event, at the 1994 Commonwealth Games in Victoria, British Columbia, Canada.
