= Simon Hollingsworth =

Australian track and field athlete and businessman

Personal information
- Nationality: Australian
- Born: 9 May 1972 (age 54) Launceston, Tasmania, Australia
- Height: 190 cm (6 ft 3 in)
- Weight: 75 kg (165 lb)

Sport
- Sport: Athletics
- Event: Sprints / hurdles
- Club: OVA AC
Medal record
Men's Athletics
Representing Australia
World Junior Championships
Bronze medal – third place	1990 Plovdiv	4×400 m relay

Simon James Hollingsworth (born 9 May 1972) is an Australian former track and field athlete. He is currently the CEO of Athletics Australia.

== Athletic career ==
Hollingsworth competed nationally and internationally for Australia in the 400 metres hurdles. He participated in the 1992 and 1996 Olympic Games, the Commonwealth Games and World Athletics Championships.

Hollingsworth holds the record in the 400m hurdles at under 18 level with a time of 50.45 seconds.

He finished second behind Kriss Akabusi in the 400 metres hurdles event at the British 1992 AAA Championships.

== Education ==
He studied at St Patrick's College, Launceston, and St Virgil's College, Hobart, before graduating from the University of Tasmania in 1996 with a combined degree of Bachelor of Commerce and Bachelor of Laws, achieving Honours in Law.

He was a Rhodes Scholar at Exeter College, Oxford where he studied Philosophy, Politics, and Economics.

== Business career ==
Hollingsworth is a member of the Athletes commission and has acted as chairperson of the Commission since 2000.

Hollingsworth was an Executive Director in the Victorian Department of Premier and Cabinet before being appointed the CEO of the Australian Sports Commission on 27 September 2011. He resigned as CEO in August 2016 to take up a senior finance position in the Victorian Government. He later served as CEO of the Magistrates' Court of Victoria.

In May 2024, Hollingsworth was appointed CEO of Athletics Australia.

== National podiums ==
- 400 m hurdles
  - 1993–94: third (49.68)
  - 1994–95: runner-up (49.73)
  - 1995–96: runner-up (50.12)

== International competitions ==
Year	Competition	Venue	Position	Event	Notes
1990	Commonwealth Games	Auckland, New Zealand	12th	400 m hurdles	51.54
1990	World Junior Championships	Plovdiv, Bulgaria	20th	400 m hurdles	52.9
1990	World Junior Championships	Plovdiv, Bulgaria	3rd	4 × 400 m relay	3:05.51
1992	Olympic Games	Barcelona, Spain	22nd	400 m hurdles	49.74
1994	Commonwealth Games	Victoria, Canada	—	400 m hurdles	DNF
1994	Commonwealth Games	Victoria, Canada	5th	4 × 400 m relay	3:03.46
1995	World Championships	Gothenburg, Sweden	34th	400 m hurdles	50.66
1996	Olympic Games	Atlanta, United States	51st	400 m hurdles	52.16
