= Orville Taylor =

Jamaican sprinter

Personal information
- Born: 11 May 1970 (age 56)
Medal record
Men's Athletics
Representing Jamaica
Pan American Games
Silver medal – second place	1995 Mar del Plata	4x400 m
CAC Championships
Silver medal – second place	1995 Guatemala City	400 m

Orville Taylor (born 11 May 1970) is a retired male sprinter from Jamaica. He claimed a silver medal at the 1995 Pan American Games in Mar del Plata, Argentina in the men's 4x400 metres relay, alongside Dennis Blake, Roxbert Martin, and Michael McDonald. Taylor set his personal best in the men's 200 metres (20.67) on 2002-05-25 in San Angelo, Texas.
