= Pierre-Marie Hilaire =

French sprinter

Medal record

Men's athletics

Representing France

European Championships
| Silver medal – second place | 1994 Helsinki | 4×400 m |

Pierre-Marie Hilaire (born 19 November 1965 in Deshaies, Guadeloupe) is a French athlete who specializes in the 300 and 400 meters. Hilaire competed at the 1995 World Championships in Athletics.
