= Sunday Bada =

Nigerian sprinter (1969–2011)

Personal information
- Born: 22 June 1969 Kaduna, Nigeria
- Died: 12 December 2011 (aged 42)
Medal record
Men's athletics
Representing Nigeria
Olympic Games
Gold medal – first place	2000 Sydney	4×400 m
World Championships
Bronze medal – third place	1995 Gothenburg	4×400 m
World Indoor Championships
Gold medal – first place	1997 Paris	400 m
Silver medal – second place	1993 Toronto	400 m
Silver medal – second place	1995 Barcelona	400 m
African Championships
Gold medal – first place	1990 Cairo	4×400 m
Bronze medal – third place	1990 Cairo	200 m
Bronze medal – third place	1990 Cairo	400 m

Sunday Bada (22 June 1969 – 12 December 2011) was a Nigerian sprinter who specialized in the 400 metres event. He won three medals at the World Indoor Championships, including a gold medal in 1997. His personal best time was 44.63 seconds, and with 45.51 seconds indoor he holds the African indoor record. He set a national record in the 4 × 400 metres relay at the 2000 Olympics, where the Nigerian team also won gold medals after the disqualification of the US team who had finished first.

== Early career ==
Bada was born in Kaduna to parents from Ogidi, Kogi State. He broke through at the regional level in 1990, with bronze medals in both 200 and 400 metres at the 1990 African Championships. The next year, at the 1991 All-Africa Games, he won a silver in the 400 metres. He competed without reaching the final in the 400 metres of the 1992 Olympics, but in the 4 × 400 metres relay he managed to finish fifth with the Nigerian team. The same year he broke the 45-second barrier by running the 400 m in 44.99 seconds, in September in Havana. This happened at the 1992 IAAF World Cup, an event he won.

Bada became Nigerian 400 metres champion in 1990, 1991, 1992, 1993, 1994, 1995, 1996, 1997 and 2001. He also participated in, and won, the Indian championships in 1994.

== World championships ==
Bada made his definite breakthrough in 1993, when he won the silver medal at the World Indoor Championships. In the same year he finished fifth at the 1993 World Championships. In the World Championships final he clocked in 44.63 seconds, the second fastest time ever by a Nigerian sprinter, after Innocent Egbunike's 44.17 s.

In 1994 he added almost a second to his season's best, running in 45.55 seconds in Monaco. The season highlight was a bronze medal at the Commonwealth Games. In 1995, however, he gained his second silver medal at the World Indoor Championships whereas at the World Championships he finished eighth. In the 1995 World Championships relay he won a bronze medal together with teammates Udeme Ekpeyong, Kunle Adejuyigbe and Jude Monye. Finally, at the All-Africa Games he won the 200 metres and took the 400 m silver. He ran 44.83 seconds as a season's best in 1995; then 44.88 in 1996. At the 1996 Olympics he reached the final in neither 400 nor the relay. In the 1996–97 indoor season he achieved his best result with a gold medal at the World Indoor Championships. He ran in 45.51 seconds, a life best performance indoor, and also the African indoor record for the event.

However, Bada just barely managed to improve this time during the outdoor season, with 45.37 seconds, and would never run a sub-45 race again. In individual competitions he was successively eliminated before the final of the 1997 World Championships, the 1999 World Indoor Championships, the 1999 World Championships, the 2000 Olympic Games, the 2001 World Indoor Championships and 2001 World Championships. A highlight in these years was the 4 × 400 m relay at the 2000 Olympics, where the Nigerian team won silver medals, later upgraded to gold after the disqualification of the US. Nigeria also established a national record time of 2:58.68 minutes.

== Post-active career ==
Bada retired following the 2001 season. After his active career Bada was the technical director of the Athletics Federation of Nigeria. He died in December 2011 at the National Stadium, Lagos.

Olympic Games
Preceded by Mary Onyali-Omagbemi	Flagbearer for Nigeria; Sydney 2000	Succeeded by Mary Onyali-Omagbemi
