= Hayden Stephen =

Trinidad and Tobago sprinter

Personal information
- Born: Hayden Stephen; 9 January 1972 (age 54)

Sport
- Country: Trinidad and Tobago
- Sport: Athletics
Medal record
Men's Athletics
Commonwealth Games
Bronze medal – third place	1994 Victoria	4 × 400m relay
Pan American Games
Bronze medal – third place	1995 Mar del Plata	4 × 400m relay

Hayden Stephen (born 9 January 1972) is a former athlete from Trinidad and Tobago.

Stephen was an All-American sprinter for the UTEP Miners track and field team, finishing 5th in the 4 × 400 metres relay at the 1994 NCAA Division I Outdoor Track and Field Championships.

Stephen was a member of Trinidad and Tobago's bronze medal winning 4 × 400 metres relay teams at both the 1994 Commonwealth Games and 1995 Pan American Games.
