= Bobang Phiri =

South African sprinter

Medal record

Men's athletics

Representing South Africa

African Championships
Gold medal – first place	1992 Belle Vue Harel	400 m

Bobang Molebetsi Phiri (born 5 May 1968) is a retired South African sprinter who specialized in the 400 metres, who competed in three consecutive Summer Olympics, starting in 1992.

He won this event at the 1992 African Championships in Athletics, and finished eighth at the 1994 Commonwealth Games. He twice competed in the Olympics, in 1996 and 2000.
