= Athletics at the 1994 Commonwealth Games =

Athletics at the 15th Commonwealth Games
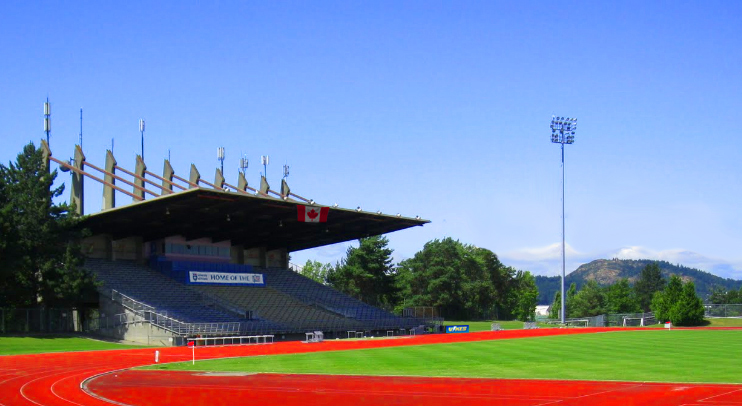
- Dates: 21–28 August 1994
- Host city: Victoria, BC, Canada
- Venue: Centennial Stadium
- Level: Senior
- Events: 42 (+2 disability)
- Participation: 732 (+disabled) athletes from 54 nations
- Records set: 11 Games records

At the 1994 Commonwealth Games, the athletics event were held in Victoria, BC, Canada, at the Centennial Stadium on the grounds of the University of Victoria. A total of 44 events were contested, of which 22 were for male athletes and 19 were for female athletes. Furthermore, 2 men's disability events were held within the programme.

There were 126 medals decided in total with England topping the table with 36 medals in total. Australia were second with 22 and the host nation Canada came third with 15.

The competition saw both the rise and fall of Horace Dove-Edwin, a sprinter from Sierra Leone. He became his country's first Commonwealth medallist with an unexpected silver medal behind Linford Christie in the 100 metres. He had not attended the opening ceremony as his country did not have enough money for a uniform and his story attracted much public sympathy and attention from the press. His meteoric rise (improving from 10.34 seconds to 10.02 over two days) was swiftly punctured as he was banned for two years after his doping test came back positive for the steroid stanozolol.

== Medal summary ==
=== Men ===
Event	Gold		Silver		Bronze	
100 metres	Linford Christie; England	9.91 GR	Michael Green; Jamaica	10.05	Frankie Fredericks; Namibia	10.06
200 metres	Frankie Fredericks; Namibia	19.97 GR	John Regis; England	20.25	Daniel Effiong; Nigeria	20.40
400 metres	Charles Gitonga; Kenya	45.00	Du'aine Ladejo; England	45.11	Sunday Bada; Nigeria	45.45
800 metres	Patrick Konchellah; Kenya	1:45.18	Hezekiél Sepeng; South Africa	1:45.76	Savieri Ngidhi; Zimbabwe	1:46.06
1500 metres	Reuben Chesang; Kenya	3:36.70	Kevin Sullivan; Canada	3:36.78	John Mayock; England	3:37.22
5000 metres	Rob Denmark; England	13:23.00	Phillimon Hanneck; Zimbabwe	13:23.20	John Nuttall; England	13:23.54
10,000 metres	Lameck Aguta; Kenya	28:38.22	Tendai Chimusasa; Zimbabwe	28:47.72	Fackson Nkandu; Zambia	28:51.72
Marathon	Steve Moneghetti; Australia	2:11:49	Sean Quilty; Australia	2:14:57	Mark Hudspith; England	2:15:11
110 metres hurdles	Colin Jackson; Wales	13.08 GR	Tony Jarrett; England	13.22	Paul Gray; Wales	13.54
400 metres hurdles	Samuel Matete; Zambia	48.67	Gideon Biwott; Kenya	49.43	Barnabas Kinyor; Kenya	49.50
3000 metres steeplechase	Johnstone Kipkoech; Kenya	8:14.72 GR	Gideon Chirchir; Kenya	8:15.25	Graeme Fell; Canada	8:23.28
4 × 100 metres relay	Canada; Donovan Bailey; Glenroy Gilbert; Carlton Chambers; Bruny Surin	38.39 GR	Australia; Shane Naylor; Tim Jackson; Paul Henderson; Damien Marsh; Kyle Vander Kuyp	38.88	England; Jason John; Toby Box; Philip Goedluck; Terry Williams; Mark Smith	39.39
4 × 400 metres relay	England; David McKenzie; Peter Crampton; Adrian Patrick; Du'aine Ladejo; Alex Fugallo; Mark Smith	3:02.14 GR	Jamaica; Orville Taylor; Dennis Blake; Linval Laird; Garth Robinson; Roxbert Martin	3:02.32	Trinidad and Tobago; Patrick Delice; Neil de Silva; Hayden Stephen; Ian Morris	3:02.78
30 kilometres walk	Nick A'Hern; Australia	2:07:53	Tim Berrett; Canada	2:08:22	Scott Nelson; New Zealand	2:09:10
High jump	Tim Forsyth; Australia	2.32 m	Steve Smith; England	2.32 m	Geoff Parsons; Scotland	2.31 m
Pole vault	Neil Winter; Wales	5.40 m GR	Curtis Heywood; Canada	5.30 m	James Miller; Australia	5.30 m
Long jump	Obinna Eregbu; Nigeria	8.05 m	David Culbert; Australia	8.00 m	Ian James; Canada	7.93 m
Triple jump	Julian Golley; England	17.03 m	Jonathan Edwards; England	17.00 m	Brian Wellman; Bermuda	17.00 m
Shot put	Matt Simson; England	19.49 m	Courtney Ireland; New Zealand	19.38 m	Chima Ugwu; Nigeria	19.26 m
Discus throw	Werner Reiterer; Australia	62.76 m	Adewale Olukoju; Nigeria	62.46 m	Robert Weir; England	60.86 m
Hammer throw	Sean Carlin; Australia	73.48 m	Paul Head; England	70.18 m	Peter Vivian; England	69.80 m
Javelin throw	Steve Backley; England	82.74 m	Mick Hill; England	81.84 m	Gavin Lovegrove; New Zealand	80.42 m
Decathlon	Mike Smith; Canada	8326 pts	Peter Winter; Australia	8074 pts	Simon Shirley; England	7980 pts

=== Men's EAD ===
(Elite athletes with a disability)

Event	Gold		Silver		Bronze	
800m wheelchair	Jeff Adams; Canada	1:44.94 GR	David Holding; England	1:45.13	Paul Wiggins; Australia	1:45.40
Marathon wheelchair	Paul Wiggins; Australia	1:37:33 GR	Ivan Newman; England	1:41:55	Ben Lucas; New Zealand	1:42:19

=== Women ===
Event	Gold		Silver		Bronze	
100 metres	Mary Onyali; Nigeria	11.06	Christy Opara-Thompson; Nigeria	11.22	Paula Thomas; England	11.23
200 metres	Cathy Freeman; Australia	22.25 GR	Mary Onyali; Nigeria	22.35	Melinda Gainsford; Australia	22.68
400 metres	Cathy Freeman; Australia	50.38 GR	Fatima Yusuf; Nigeria	50.53	Sandie Richards; Jamaica	50.69
800 metres	Inez Turner; Jamaica	2:01.74	Charmaine Crooks; Canada	2:02.35	Gladys Wamuyu; Kenya	2:03.12
1500 metres	Kelly Holmes; England	4:08.86	Paula Schnurr; Canada	4:09.65	Gwen Griffiths; South Africa	4:10.16
3000 metres	Angela Chalmers; Canada	8:32.17 GR	Robyn Meagher; Canada	8:45.59	Alison Wyeth; England	8:47.98
10,000 metres	Yvonne Murray; Scotland	31:56.97	Elana Meyer; South Africa	32:06.02	Jane Omoro; Kenya	32:13.01
Marathon	Carole Rouillard; Canada	2:30:41	Lizanne Bussières; Canada	2:31:07	Yvonne Danson; England	2:32:24
100 metres hurdles	Michelle Freeman; Jamaica	13.12	Jacqui Agyepong; England	13.14	Sam Farquharson; England	13.38
400 metres hurdles	Sally Gunnell; England	54.51	Deon Hemmings; Jamaica	55.11	Debbie-Ann Parris; Jamaica	55.25
4 × 100 metres relay	Nigeria; Faith Idehen; Mary Tombiri; Christy Opara-Thompson; Mary Onyali	42.99	Australia; Monique Miers; Cathy Freeman; Melinda Gainsford; Kathy Sambell	43.43	England; Stephi Douglas; Geraldine McLeod; Simmone Jacobs; Paula Thomas	43.46
4 × 400 metres relay	England; Phylis Smith; Tracy Goddard; Linda Keough; Sally Gunnell	3:27.06 GR	Jamaica; Revoli Campbell; Deon Hemmings; Inez Turner; Sandie Richards	3:28.63	Canada; Alanna Yakiwchuck; Stacey Bowen; Donalda Duprey; Charmaine Crooks	3:33.52
10 kilometres walk	Kerry Saxby-Junna; Australia	44:25	Anne Manning; Australia	44:37	Janice McCaffrey; Canada	44:54
High jump	Alison Inverarity; Australia	1.94 m	Charmaine Weavers; South Africa	1.94 m	Debbie Marti; England	1.91 m
Long jump	Nicole Boegman; Australia	6.82 m	Yinka Idowu; England	6.73 m	Christy Opara-Thompson; Nigeria	6.72 m
Shot put	Judy Oakes; England	18.16 m	Myrtle Augee; England	17.64 m	Lisa-Marie Vizaniari; Australia	16.61 m
Discus throw	Daniela Costian; Australia	63.72 m GR	Beatrice Faumuina; New Zealand	57.12 m	Lizette Etsebeth; South Africa	55.74 m
Javelin throw	Louise McPaul; Australia	63.76 m	Kirsten Hellier; New Zealand	60.40 m	Sharon Gibson; England	58.20 m
Heptathlon	Denise Lewis; England	6325 pts	Jane Flemming; Australia	6317 pts	Catherine Bond-Mills; Canada	6193 pts

== Medal table ==
* Host nation (Canada)

Rank	Nation	Gold	Silver	Bronze	Total
1	Australia	12	6	6	24
2	England	11	14	13	38
3	Canada*	6	6	4	16
4	Kenya	5	2	3	10
5	Nigeria	3	4	4	11
6	Jamaica	2	4	2	8
7	Wales	2	0	1	3
8	Namibia	1	0	1	2
8	Scotland	1	0	1	2
8	Zambia	1	0	1	2
11	New Zealand	0	3	3	6
12	South Africa	0	3	2	5
13	Zimbabwe	0	2	1	3
14	Bermuda	0	0	1	1
14	Trinidad and Tobago	0	0	1	1
Totals (15 entries)		44	44	44	132

== Participation ==
- Antigua and Barbuda (3)
- Australia (77)
- Bahamas (12)
- Bangladesh (2)
- Barbados (8)
- Belize (6)
- Bermuda (7)
- Botswana (8)
- Brunei (4)
- British Virgin Islands (7)
- Canada (106)
- Cyprus (10)
- Dominica (6)
- England (105)
- Falkland Islands (1)
- Gambia (4)
- Ghana (23)
- Guyana (2)
- Hong Kong (3)
- Isle of Man (4)
- Jamaica (32)
- Jersey (1)
- Kenya (46)
- Lesotho (7)
- Malawi (3)
- Maldives (1)
- Malaysia (8)
- Malta (1)
- Mauritius (9)
- Montserrat (2)
- Namibia (8)
- New Zealand (26)
- Nauru (1)
- Nigeria (25)
- Northern Ireland (10)
- Pakistan (2)
- Papua New Guinea (7)
- Saint Kitts and Nevis (2)
- Saint Lucia (3)
- Saint Vincent and the Grenadines (6)
- Seychelles (4)
- Scotland (33)
- Sierra Leone (8)
- Singapore (1)
- South Africa (29)
- Swaziland (4)
- Tanzania (2)
- Tonga (6)
- Trinidad and Tobago (9)
- Uganda (4)
- Vanuatu (2)
- Wales (16)
- Zambia (4)
- Zimbabwe (12)

== See also ==
- Athletics at the 1992 Summer Olympics
- 1994 in athletics (track and field)
- 1995 World Championships in Athletics
