= Arnold Payne (athlete) =

Zimbabwean athlete

Arnold Payne (born 17 October 1972) is a Zimbabwean athlete. He was in his country's team in the 4 x 400m relay in the Men's 4 x 400 metres relay in the 1995 World Championships in Athletics.

Payne competed for the Kentucky Wildcats track and field team in the NCAA. In 2008, he started an African safari company. He later became a track coach for Valley Christian Schools in Arizona.
