= Charles Gitonga =

Kenyan sprinter

Charles Gìtonga
Personal information
- Born: 5 October 1971 (age 54) Nyeri, Kenya
Medal record
Men's athletics
Representing Kenya
African Championships
Gold medal – first place	1993 Durban	4×400 m
Commonwealth Games
Gold medal – first place	1994 Victoria	400 metres

Charles Gìtonga (born 5 October 1971) is a retired athlete from Kenya who specialized in the 400 metres. He is best known for winning the gold medal at the 1994 Commonwealth Games in Victoria.

His personal best time was 44.20 seconds, achieved in June 1996 in Nairobi. The result gives him a 19th place on the world all-time performers list, and is only 0.02 seconds behind the Kenyan record set by Samson Kitur four years earlier.
