= Mario Todman =

Personal information
- Born: 29 November 1974 (age 51) Road Town, Tortola, British Virgin Islands

Sport
- Sport: Track and field

Mario Todman (born 29 November 1974) is a former sprinter from the British Virgin Islands.

Todman represented British Virgin Islands at the Summer Olympics in the 1996 Summer Olympics in Atlanta, competing in the 4x100 and the 4x400 metres relay; the team finished 7th and 6th in their respective heats, not qualifying for either next round.

His older brother Willis also competed at the 1996 Summer Olympics in the relays.
