= Mark Smith (sprinter) =

British athlete

Personal information
- Nationality: English
- Born: 18 November 1971 (age 54)

Sport
- Sport: Athletics
Medal record
Athletics
Representing England
Commonwealth Games
Gold medal – first place	1994 Victoria	4x400m relay (squad member)
Bronze medal – third place	1994 Victoria	4x100m relay (squad member)

Mark Richard Smith (born 1971) is a male former athlete who competed for Southend-on-Sea AC and Woodford Green & Essex Ladies clubs and achieved representative honours for England, and Great Britain and Northern Ireland.

== Athletics career ==
Smith won 3 individual 200m English Schools' Athletics Championships titles 1988 to 1990, and was part of the winning 4x100m relay teams 1988, 1990, representing Essex County. His Senior Boys 200m win at Wigan in 1989 commences at 2:02 at https://www.youtube.com/watch?v=t4cGnXmpPd0 .

In 1990 Smith also won the UK AAA National Junior Championship U20 200m title in 20.85w (Championship Record).

Later in 1990 he represented Great Britain at the IAAF World Junior Championships in Athletics, in Plovdiv Bulgaria,a finalist in the 200m (200m final: https://www.youtube.com/watch?v=QGmW1M1omsc commence at 24:38), and a member of the 4x100m relay team who placed 4th and set a new British U20 record of 39.78sec (4x 100m final: https://www.youtube.com/watch?v=RgoGutyoLg4 commence at 23:45).

Later in his career he moved up to the 400m and went on to represent England in the 4 x 100 metres relay heats 39.51 (https://www.youtube.com/watch?v=DhBWlvkzvj8) winning a bronze medal and also the 4 x 400 metres relay winning a gold medal, at the 1994 Commonwealth Games in Victoria, British Columbia, Canada. He is credited with winning a gold medal and a bronze medal because he ran in the qualifying rounds that helped England qualify for the finals.

== Personal Bests ==
His career personal bests include: 60m = 6.9sec; 100m = 10.4w; 200m = 20.85w (20.87); 300m = 33.7; 400m = 46.44 (a).
