= Alex Fugallo =

English sprinter

Personal information
- Nationality: English
- Born: 28 January 1970 (age 56) Hampstead, North London

Sport
- Sport: Athletics
- Club: Highgate AC
Medal record
Athletics
Representing England
Commonwealth Games
Gold medal – first place	1994 Victoria	4x400m relay

Alexander 'Alex' Michael Fugallo (born 28 January 1970), is a male former athlete who competed for England.

== Athletics career ==
Fugallo represented England in the 400 metres and won a gold medal in the 4 x 400 metres event, at the 1994 Commonwealth Games in Victoria, British Columbia, Canada. He is credited with winning a gold medal because he ran in the heats that helped England qualify for the final.
