= Roxbert Martin =

Jamaican sprinter (born 1969)

Personal information
- Born: 5 November 1969 (age 56)
Medal record
Men's athletics
Representing Jamaica
Olympic Games
Bronze medal – third place	1996 Atlanta	4 × 400 metres
Commonwealth Games
Gold medal – first place	1998 Kuala Lumpur	4 × 400 metres
Pan American Games
Silver medal – second place	1995 Mar del Plata	4 × 400 metres

Roxbert Martin (born 5 November 1969) is a former Jamaican 400 metres runner, who was selected for the Jamaican 4 × 400 metres relay team at the 1996 Summer Olympics and won a bronze medal. He was part of the gold medal-winning relay team at the 1998 Commonwealth Games, setting the championship record.

His personal best time is 44.49 seconds, achieved in June 1997 in Kingston. This was the Jamaican record at the time but has since been broken by Jermaine Gonzales in 44.40 seconds in Monaco on 22 July 2010.

Martin competed collegiately for the University of Oklahoma's track and field team. While at Oklahoma he was part of a national champion 4 × 400 relay in 1997.
