= Du'aine Ladejo =

British athlete and TV personality

Personal information
- Nationality: British (English)
- Born: 14 February 1971 (age 55) Paddington, London, England

Sport
- Sport: Athletics
- Club: Birchfield Harriers
Medal record
Men's athletics
Representing Great Britain
Olympic Games
Silver medal – second place	1996 Atlanta	4 × 400 m relay
Bronze medal – third place	1992 Barcelona	4 × 400 m relay
European Championships
Gold medal – first place	1994 Helsinki	400 m
Gold medal – first place	1994 Helsinki	4 × 400 m relay
European Indoor Championships
Gold medal – first place	1994 Paris	400 m
Gold medal – first place	1996 Stockholm	400 m
Representing England
Commonwealth Games
Gold medal – first place	1994 Victoria	4 × 400 m relay
Silver medal – second place	1994 Victoria	400 m

Du'aine Ladejo (born 14 February 1971, in Paddington, London) is a British athlete and television personality. He won the 400 metres sprint gold medal at the 1994 European Championships and was a member of the United Kingdom and England 400-metre relay squads at the European Championships, Olympics and Commonwealth Games during the 1990s.

Since retiring from athletics, he has appeared on several television shows including Gladiators, where he was known by the alias Predator. Ladejo is also the founder of Du'aine's Fit4Schools, an organisation which raises funds to promote health and fitness in schools.

== Education ==
Ladejo started his education at Forest Grange School in West Sussex, before going on to King Edward's School, Witley. He completed his high school education in the United States at Medina High School in Medina, Ohio, where he graduated in 1988. He then went on to study radio, television and film at the University of Texas, graduating in 1993. While at Texas, Ladejo competed for the Texas Longhorns track and field team in the NCAA.

== Athletics career ==
At the 1994 European Championships, Ladejo won gold medals in both the 400 metres and the 4 × 400 metres relay. He won the individual sprint in 45.09 seconds, beating his compatriot and defending-champion Roger Black into second place. Ladejo also won the 400 metres gold medal at the European Indoor Championships in both 1994 and 1996. At the 1994 Commonwealth Games, he won a 400 metres silver medal (finishing runner-up to Kenya's Charles Gitonga) and a 4 × 400 metres relay gold medal. At the Olympic Games, Ladejo won two medals in the 4 × 400 metres relay – a silver medal in 1996 and a bronze medal in 1992.

Following the 1996 Olympics, Ladejo switched his focus to other athletics events, though he never enjoyed as much success as he did in the 400 metres. He tried his hand at the decathlon, in which he finished seventh at the 1998 Commonwealth Games, and also competed in the 400-metre hurdles. During his athletics career, Ladejo trained with Birchfield Harriers.

== Media career ==
For a period during his athletics career, Ladejo also presented a TV show, Du'aine's World, on London Weekend Television. In the early 2000s, Ladejo competed in the BBC TV sports show Superstars, winning the competition in 2004 and finishing runner-up to Alain Baxter in 2005. Ladejo also appeared on the ITV reality TV show Celebrity Love Island in 2005.

Ladejo is the creator and owner of the television show Australia's Greatest Athlete. It aired in 2009, 2010 and 2011 on Network television station Channel 9 and Channel 7 in Australia. It was repeated on Fox sports channel. He is also the owner of the brand and trademark Greatest Athlete.

In 2008, Ladejo joined the Sky One revival of the TV show Gladiators, competing under the alias "Predator".
