= Paul Greene (athlete) =

Australian musician and former athlete (born 1976)

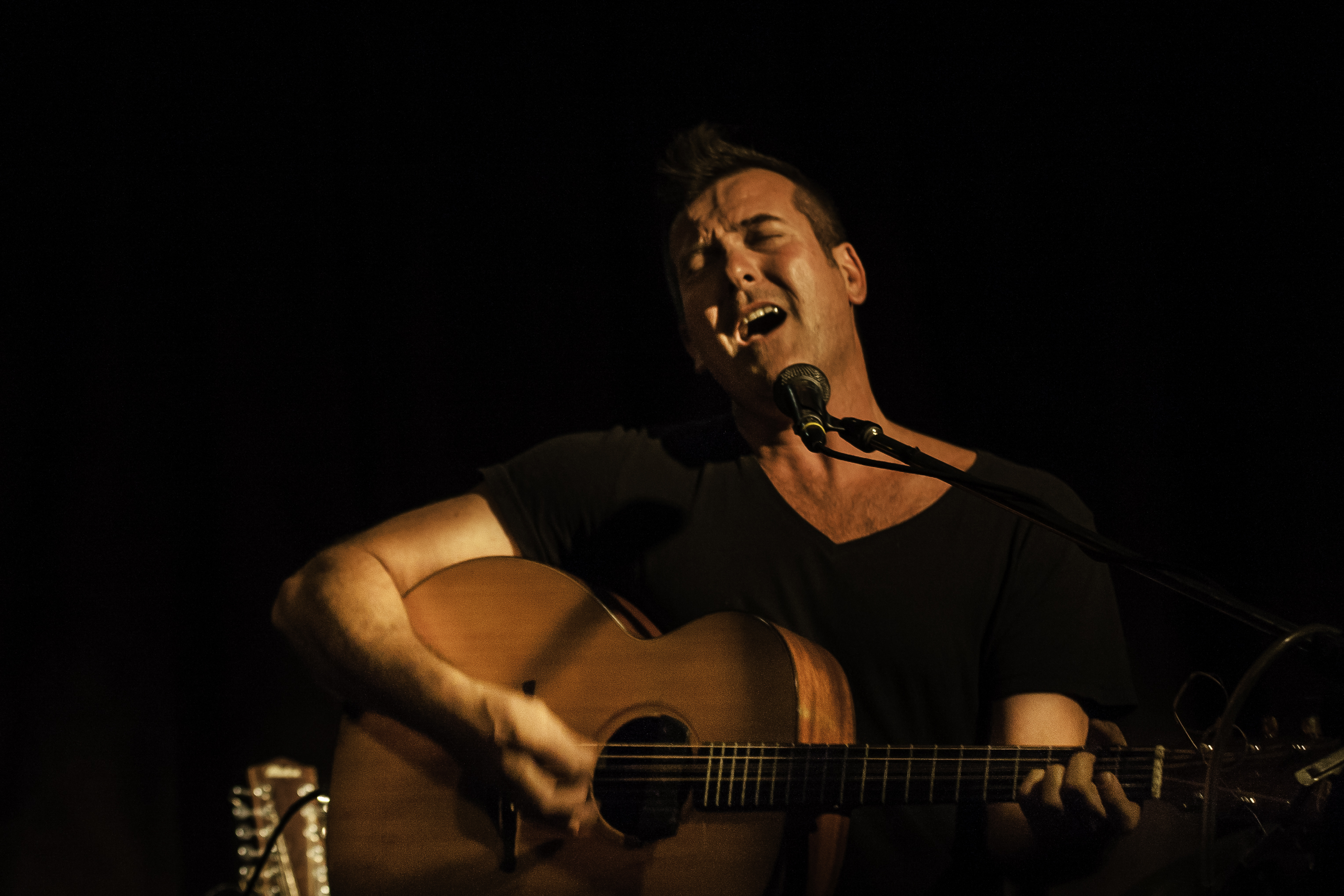
- Greene in 2013

Personal information
- Nationality: Australian
- Born: 9 December 1972 (age 53) Sydney, Australia

Sport
- Sport: Running
- Event: Sprints
Medal record
Men's Athletics
Representing Australia
World Junior Championships
Bronze medal – third place	1990 Plovdiv	4 × 400 m relay

Paul Haydon Greene (born 9 December 1972) is an Australian musician and former athlete who competed in the 1996 Olympics in the 400 m and 4 × 400 m relay. He also competed in the Commonwealth Games in 1990 and 1994, and the World Championships in 1991 and 1995

In 2000, he joined the Australian superband Ghostwriters with drummer Rob Hirst (Midnight Oil) and bassist Rick Grossman (ex-Hoodoo Gurus).

In 2001 Greene released his first solo album The Miles which was well received, and led to the release of This Way, Happy Here With You, Reset, Distance Over Time and Everywhere Is Home. This release has seen him move into the role of producer and engineer.

In 2012, under the name Paul Greene & The Other Colours, the self-recorded and produced Behind the Stars was released and was ARIA finalist for best Blues and Roots Album. One Lap Around the Sun was released in 2014 also self recorded and produced. Greene runs his own record Label and recording studio Red Shelf Records records.

== Personal life ==
Greene has 3 children, Lily (born 2004) Matilda (born 2008) and Quincy (Born 2017). In 2018 he wrote a school song for Culburra Public School in 2018 and continues to write, produce and release music through Red Shelf Records. He now coaches Athletics. In 2025, he was accused of domestic abuse and served an apprehended violence order in Nowra, NSW, which he did not contest. In March 2026, he was charged with a breach of a domestic violence order and he appeared in Nowra Court. The matter will be back in Court on May 28 to be heard alongside a second ADVO which Mr Greene is contesting.

== Discography ==
=== Albums ===
List of albums, with selected details
Title	Album details
The Miles	Released: 2001; Label: Paul Greene (PG001); Format: CD
This Way	Released: 2002; Label: Paul Greene (PG002); Format: CD
Happy Here With You	Released: 2004; Label: Paul Greene (PG004); Format: CD
Reset	Released: 2005; Label: Acmec Records (ACMEC060); Format: CD
Distance Over Time	Released: 2008; Label: Compass Bros. (047CDCB); Format: CD
Everywhere Is Home	Released: 2010; Label: Paul Greene (PG008); Format: CD
Behind The Stars (as Paul Greene and the Other Colours)	Released: 2012; Label: ABC (2799338); Format: CD
One Lap of the Sun (as Paul Greene and the Other Colours)	Released: 2014; Label: ABC, UMA (3773532); Format: CD

‘Sounds Delicious’
(As Paul Greene)

- released: 2021
- label: Sounds Delicious / MGM
- format: Digital / Vinyl
