= 1993 IAAF World Indoor Championships – Men's 400 metres =

The men's 400 metres event at the 1993 IAAF World Indoor Championships was held on 12, 13 and 14 March.

== Medalists ==
Gold	Silver	Bronze
Butch Reynolds; United States	Sunday Bada; Nigeria	Darren Clark; Australia

== Results ==
=== Heats ===
First 2 of each heat (Q) and next 2 fastest (q) qualified for the semifinals.

Rank	Heat	Name	Nationality	Time	Notes
1	3	Butch Reynolds	United States	46.37	Q
2	1	Ibrahim Ismail Muftah	Qatar	46.43	Q, AR
3	1	Sunday Bada	Nigeria	46.57	Q
4	2	Rico Lieder	Germany	46.63	Q
5	3	Darren Clark	Australia	46.76	Q
6	2	Benyounés Lahlou	Morocco	46.81	Q, NR
7	3	Mark Jackson	Canada	47.03	q
8	3	Masayoshi Kan	Japan	47.16	q, NR
9	4	Jason Rouser	United States	47.35	Q
10	4	Devon Morris	Jamaica	47.42	Q
11	5	Cephas Lemba	Zambia	47.47	Q
12	2	Eronilde de Araújo	Brazil	47.50	AR
13	2	Troy Douglas	Bermuda	47.55	
13	5	Cayetano Cornet	Spain	47.55	Q
15	4	Alvin Daniel	Trinidad and Tobago	47.56	
16	4	Anton Ivanov	Bulgaria	47.83	
17	3	Marco Vaccari	Italy	47.84	
18	1	Dmitriy Kosov	Russia	47.86	
19	1	Francis Ogola	Uganda	48.06	NR
20	2	Shigekazu Ōmori	Japan	48.32	
21	5	John Lawson	South Africa	48.43	
22	1	Bekele Ergogo	Ethiopia	48.82	
23	2	Raymundo Escalante	Mexico	49.09	
24	5	Ian Morris	Trinidad and Tobago	49.91	
	1	Anthony Wallace	Jamaica	DQ	
	4	Emin Makhmudbekov	Azerbaijan	DQ	
	5	Karsten Just	Germany	DQ	
	3	Aivar Ojastu	Estonia	DNS	
	4	Sidnei de Souza	Brazil	DNS	

=== Semifinals ===
First 2 of each semifinal (Q) and the next 2 fastest (q) qualified for the final.

Rank	Heat	Name	Nationality	Time	Notes
1	1	Butch Reynolds	United States	45.70	Q
2	1	Rico Lieder	Germany	46.16	Q
3	2	Sunday Bada	Nigeria	46.29	Q
4	1	Darren Clark	Australia	46.64	q, AR
5	2	Jason Rouser	United States	46.80	Q
6	1	Devon Morris	Jamaica	46.83	q
7	2	Mark Jackson	Canada	47.10	
8	2	Cayetano Cornet	Spain	47.12	
9	1	Cephas Lemba	Zambia	47.16	
10	1	Masayoshi Kan	Japan	47.25	
	2	Benyounés Lahlou	Morocco	DQ	
	2	Ibrahim Ismail Muftah	Qatar	DQ	

=== Final ===
Rank	Name	Nationality	Time	Notes
1st place, gold medalist(s)	Butch Reynolds	United States	45.26	CR
2nd place, silver medalist(s)	Sunday Bada	Nigeria	45.75	AR
3rd place, bronze medalist(s)	Darren Clark	Australia	46.45	AR
4	Rico Lieder	Germany	46.53	
5	Devon Morris	Jamaica	46.67	
6	Jason Rouser	United States	46.70	
