= Athletics at the 1992 Summer Olympics – Men's 4 × 400 metres relay =

Men's 4 × 400 metres relay at the Games of the XXV Olympiad
- Venue: Stadium Australia
- Date: 7 August 1992 (round 1); 8 August 1992 (final)
- Competitors: 102 from 24 nations
- Teams: 102
- Winning time: 2:55.74 WR

Medalists
1st place, gold medalist(s)		Andrew Valmon, Quincy Watts, Michael Johnson, Steve Lewis, Darnell Hall*, Charles Jenkins*	United States
2nd place, silver medalist(s)		Lázaro Martínez, Héctor Herrera, Norberto Téllez, Roberto Hernández	Cuba
3rd place, bronze medalist(s)		Roger Black, David Grindley, Kriss Akabusi, John Regis, Du'aine Ladejo*, Mark Richardson* * Athletes who participated in the heats only and received medals.	Great Britain

Official Video Highlights

These are the official results of the men's 4 × 400 metres relay event at the 1992 Summer Olympics in Barcelona, Spain. There were a total number of 24 nations competing, with three qualifying heats.

== Records ==
These were the standing world and Olympic records (in minutes) prior to the 1992 Summer Olympics.

World Record and Olympic Record	2:56.16(*)	(United States) Vincent Matthews (United States) Ron Freeman (United States) Larry James (United States) Lee Evans	Mexico City (MEX)	October 20, 1968
World Record and Olympic Record	2:56.16	(United States) Danny Everett (United States) Steve Lewis (United States) Kevin Robinzine (United States) Butch Reynolds	Seoul (KOR)	October 1, 1988

(*) Altitude over 1000 metres

The following Olympic records were set during this competition. The United States set a new world record with 2:55.74 in the final.

Date	Athlete	Time	OR	WR
August 8, 1992	(United States) Andrew Valmon (United States) Quincy Watts (United States) Michael Johnson (United States) Steve Lewis	2:55.74	OR	WR

== Summary ==
Coming out of the start in the final, Lázaro Martínez for Cuba began to pull away from Samson Kitur for Kenya to the inside. Similarly American Andrew Valmon gained on Udeme Ekpeyong for Nigeria to his outside. Coming off the turn, Valmon had the lead and further separated from a slowing Martínez. Kitur and GBR's Roger Black closed to tighten the battle for second. Kenya passed second as Abednego Matilu led the group through the turn. But American Gold medalist Quincy Watts was long gone with a 10-metre lead by the break. Down the backstretch, GBR's David Grindley was able to pass Matilu on the inside followed by Cuba's Héctor Herrera on the outside. At the 200 metre start line, halfway through the lap, Matilu just stopped like he had finished a 200-metre interval, taking Kenya out of the race. Watts padded another 5 metres to the American lead, passing to future world record holder Michael Johnson. Watts' 43.1 split was at the time the fastest relay split in history, and today still ranks tied for #4. Grindley held a metre lead into the handoff to Kriss Akabusi. Johnson had suffered from food poisoning in Barcelona, which took him out of the 200 metres competition just a few days earlier. Here Johnson appeared healthy, extending the American lead to over 20 metres. Behind him, Cuban Norberto Téllez moved onto Akabusi's shoulder, ready to pounce coming off the final turn, but Akabusi held him off. Johnson passed off to 1988 gold medalist, world junior record holder Steve Lewis two and a half seconds before Akabusi passed to John Regis and Téllez to Roberto Hernández. The more experienced Hernández pounced on 200 metre runner Regis through the first turn. USA had a half a straightaway lead to take the gold unchallenged. Their new world record time flashed on the scoreboard around the stadium for almost 4 seconds before Hernández and Regis arrived.

== Final ==
- Held on August 8, 1992

RANK	NATION	FINAL	TIME
	United States	• Andrew Valmon • Quincy Watts • Michael Johnson • Steve Lewis	2:55.74
	Cuba	• Lázaro Martínez • Héctor Herrera • Norberto Téllez • Roberto Hernández	2:59.51
	Great Britain	• Roger Black • David Grindley • Kriss Akabusi • John Regis	2:59.73
4.	Brazil	• Robson Caetano • Ediélson Rocha Tenório • Sérgio Matias de Menezes • Sidney Telles de Souza	3:01.61
5.	Nigeria	• Udeme Ekpeyong • Emmanuel Okoli • Hassan Bosso • Sunday Bada	3:01.71
6.	Italy	• Alessandro Aimar • Marco Vaccari • Fabio Grossi • Andrea Nuti	3:02.18
7.	Trinidad and Tobago	• Alvin Daniel • Patrick Delice • Neil de Silva • Ian Morris	3:03.31
—	Kenya	• Samson Kitur • Abednego Matilu • Simeon Kipkemboi • Simon Kemboi	DNF

== Heats ==
RANK	NATION	HEAT 1	TIME
1.	Trinidad and Tobago	• Patrick Delice • Alvin Daniel • Neil de Silva • Ian Morris	3:01.05 (NR)
2.	Great Britain	• Mark Richardson • Kriss Akabusi • Roger Black • Du'aine Ladejo	3:01.20
3.	Japan	• Masayoshi Kan • Susumu Takano • Yoshihiko Saito • Takahiro Watanabe	3:01.35
4.	France	• Jean-Louis Rapnouil • Yann Quentrec • Stéphane Caristan • Stéphane Diagana	3:04.25
5.	Canada	• Mark Jackson • Anthony Wilson • Mark Graham • Frederick Williams	3:04.69
6.	Thailand	• Athiaporn Koonjarthong • Yuthana Thonglek • Sarapong Kumsup • Aktawat Sakoolchan	3:08.00
7.	Portugal	• José Mendes • Pedro Rodrigues • Alvaro Silva • Paulo Curvelo	3:10.11
8.	Zaire	• Ilunga Kafila • Luasa Batungile • Kaleka Mutoke • Shintu Kibambe	3:21.91

RANK	NATION	HEAT 2	TIME
1.	Cuba	• Lázaro Martínez • Héctor Herrera • Norberto Téllez • Roberto Hernández	2:59.13
2.	United States	• Darnell Hall • Michael Johnson • Charles Jenkins • Quincy Watts	2:59.14
3.	Kenya	• David Kitur • Samson Kitur • Simeon Kipkemboi • Simon Kemboi	2:59.63
4.	Nigeria	• Udeme Ekpeyong • Emmanuel Okoli • Hassan Bosso • Sunday Bada	3:00.39
5.	Unified Team	• Dmitry Kosov • Dmitry Kliger • Dmitry Golovastov • Oleg Tverdokhleb	3:05.59
6.	Mexico	• Raymundo Escalante • Eduardo Nava • Luis Karin Toledo • Juan Jesús Gutiérrez	3:05.75
7.	Saint Vincent and the Grenadines	• Lenford O'Garro • Michael Williams • Eversley Linley • Eswort Coombs	3:10.21
—	Barbados	• Seibert Straughn • Roger Jordan • Edsel Chase • Stevon Roberts	DSQ

RANK	NATION	HEAT 3	TIME
1.	Brazil	• Eronilde de Araujo • Ediélson Rocha • Sergio Matias de Menezes • Sidney Telles de Souza	3:01.38
2.	Italy	• Alessandro Aimar • Marco Vaccari • Fabio Grossi • Andrea Nuti	3:02.09
3.	Morocco	• Abdelali Kasbane • Abdel Ghani Guériguer • Bouchaib Belkaid • Benyounes Lahlou	3:02.28
4.	Spain	• Antonio Sánchez Muñoz • Cayetano Cornet • Manuel Moreno Sánchez • Angel de la Heras	3:04.60
5.	Qatar	• Sami Al-Abdullah • Masoud Abdul Khamis • Ibrahim Ismail Muftah • Fareh Ibrahim Ali	3:07.26
6.	Papua New Guinea	• Baobo Neuendorf • Kaminiel Selot • Bernard Manana • Subul Babo	3:13.35
—	Germany	• Ralph Pfersich • Rico Lieder • Jörg Vaihinger • Thomas Schönlebe	DSQ
—	Jamaica	• Dennis Blake • Devon Morris • Howard Davis • Patrick O'Connor	DSQ

== See also ==
- 1988 Men's Olympic 4 × 400 m Relay (Seoul)
- 1990 Men's European Championships 4 × 400 m Relay (Split)
- 1991 Men's World Championships 4 × 400 m Relay (Tokyo)
- 1993 Men's World Championships 4 × 400 m Relay (Stuttgart)
- 1994 Men's European Championships 4 × 400 m Relay (Helsinki)
- 1995 Men's World Championships 4 × 400 m Relay (Gothenburg)
