= 1992 European Athletics Indoor Championships – Men's 400 metres =

The men's 400 metres event at the 1992 European Athletics Indoor Championships was held in Palasport di Genova on 28, 29 February and 1 March.

== Medalists ==
| Gold | Silver | Bronze |
|---|---|---|
| Slobodan Branković; Yugoslavia | Andrea Nuti; Italy | David Grindley; Great Britain |

== Results ==
=== Heats ===
First 3 from each heat (Q) and the next 3 fastest (q) qualified for the semifinals.

| Rank | Heat | Name | Nationality | Time | Notes |
|---|---|---|---|---|---|
| 1 | 2 | Slobodan Branković | Yugoslavia | 46.85 | Q |
| 2 | 2 | Andrea Nuti | Italy | 46.86 | Q |
| 3 | 2 | David Grindley | Great Britain | 47.42 | Q |
| 4 | 1 | Aleksejs Iljušinš | Latvia | 47.58 | Q |
| 5 | 2 | Manuel Moreno | Spain | 47.62 | q |
| 6 | 1 | Jiří Janoušek | Czechoslovakia | 47.69 | Q |
| 7 | 1 | Fabio Grossi | Italy | 47.72 | Q |
| 8 | 1 | José Mendes | Portugal | 47.80 | q |
| 9 | 3 | Marco Vaccari | Italy | 48.13 | Q |
| 10 | 3 | Tsvetoslav Stankulov | Bulgaria | 48.18 | Q |
| 11 | 3 | Ade Mafe | Great Britain | 48.28 | Q |
| 12 | 1 | Gary Cadogan | Great Britain | 49.06 | q |
| | 3 | Aivar Ojastu | Estonia | DNS | |

=== Semifinals ===
First 3 from each semifinal qualified directly (Q) for the final.

| Rank | Heat | Name | Nationality | Time | Notes |
|---|---|---|---|---|---|
| 1 | 1 | Slobodan Branković | Yugoslavia | 46.23 | Q, NR |
| 2 | 1 | Marco Vaccari | Italy | 46.34 | Q |
| 3 | 1 | Ade Mafe | Great Britain | 46.62 | Q |
| 4 | 2 | Andrea Nuti | Italy | 46.65 | Q |
| 5 | 2 | Aleksejs Iljušinš | Latvia | 46.97 | Q, NR |
| 6 | 1 | Jiří Janoušek | Czechoslovakia | 46.98 | |
| 7 | 2 | David Grindley | Great Britain | 47.03 | Q |
| 8 | 2 | Manuel Moreno | Spain | 47.33 | |
| 9 | 2 | Tsvetoslav Stankulov | Bulgaria | 47.37 | |
| 10 | 1 | Fabio Grossi | Italy | 47.60 | |
| 11 | 1 | Gary Cadogan | Great Britain | 47.85 | |
| 12 | 2 | José Mendes | Portugal | 48.18 | |

=== Final ===
Video of the final

| Rank | Name | Nationality | Time | Notes |
|---|---|---|---|---|
| 1st place, gold medalist(s) | Slobodan Branković | Yugoslavia | 46.33 | |
| 2nd place, silver medalist(s) | Andrea Nuti | Italy | 46.37 | |
| 3rd place, bronze medalist(s) | David Grindley | Great Britain | 46.60 | |
| 4 | Aleksejs Iljušinš | Latvia | 47.02 | |
| 5 | Marco Vaccari | Italy | 47.18 | |
| 6 | Ade Mafe | Great Britain | 47.33 | |
