= 1993 World Championships in Athletics – Men's 400 metres =

Men's 400 metres at the 1993 World Championships
- Venue: Gottlieb Daimler Stadium
- Dates: 14 August (heats); 15 August (quarter-finals); 16 August (semi-finals); 17 August (final)
- Competitors: 39
- Winning time: 43.65 CR

Medalists
gold medal	Michael Johnson	United States
silver medal	Butch Reynolds	United States
bronze medal	Samson Kitur	Kenya

A total of 43 athletes participated in the men's 400 metres event at the 1993 IAAF World Championships in Stuttgart, Germany. There were six qualifying heats, and the final was held on Tuesday, 17 August 1993. The winning margin was 0.48 seconds.

== Final ==
RANK	FINAL	TIME
	Michael Johnson (USA)	43.65
	Butch Reynolds (USA)	44.13
	Samson Kitur (KEN)	44.54
4.	Quincy Watts (USA)	45.05
5.	Sunday Bada (NGR)	45.11
6.	Greg Haughton (JAM)	45.63
7.	Simon Kemboi (KEN)	45.65
8.	Kennedy Ochieng (KEN)	45.68

== Semifinals ==
- Held on Monday 1993-08-16

RANK	HEAT 1	TIME
1.	Quincy Watts (USA)	44.63
2.	Butch Reynolds (USA)	44.82
3.	Simon Kemboi (KEN)	44.94
4.	Kennedy Ochieng (KEN)	45.01
5.	Evon Clarke (JAM)	45.19
6.	Norberto Téllez (CUB)	46.17
7.	Du'aine Ladejo (GBR)	46.33
—	Ian Morris (TRI)	DNS

RANK	HEAT 2	TIME
1.	Samson Kitur (KEN)	44.34
2.	Michael Johnson (USA)	44.39
3.	Sunday Bada (NGR)	44.63
4.	Greg Haughton (JAM)	44.78
5.	Ibrahim Ismail Muftah (QAT)	44.85
6.	Solomon Amegatcher (GHA)	45.58
7.	Neil de Silva (TRI)	45.66
8.	Rico Lieder (GER)	45.75

== Quarterfinals ==
- Held on Sunday 1993-08-15

RANK	HEAT 1	TIME
1.	Quincy Watts (USA)	45.07
2.	Simon Kemboi (KEN)	45.22
3.	Neil de Silva (TRI)	45.50
4.	Rico Lieder (GER)	45.66
5.	Jean-Louis Rapnouil (FRA)	45.69
6.	Sadek Boumendil (ALG)	45.91
7.	Cayetano Cornet (ESP)	46.46
	Francis Ogola (UGA)	DQ

RANK	HEAT 2	TIME
1.	Samson Kitur (KEN)	45.02
2.	Sunday Bada (NGR)	45.21
3.	Greg Haughton (JAM)	45.48
4.	Solomon Amegatcher (GHA)	45.59
5.	Dmitriy Golovastov (RUS)	46.00
6.	Ade Mafe (GBR)	46.03
7.	Jean-Claude Yekpe (BEN)	47.09
8.	Shigekazu Omori (JPN)	47.42

RANK	HEAT 3	TIME
1.	Michael Johnson (USA)	44.72
2.	Ibrahim Ismail Muftah (QAT)	44.95
3.	Evon Clarke (JAM)	45.32
4.	Norberto Téllez (CUB)	45.51
5.	Troy Douglas (BER)	45.57
6.	Patrick Delice (TRI)	45.70
7.	Anton Ivanov (BUL)	45.93
8.	Andrea Nuti (ITA)	46.77

RANK	HEAT 4	TIME
1.	Butch Reynolds (USA)	44.71
2.	Kennedy Ochieng (KEN)	44.90
3.	Ian Morris (TRI)	45.90
4.	Du'aine Ladejo (GBR)	46.51
5.	Roger Jordan (BAR)	46.89
6.	Benyounés Lahlou (MAR)	47.83
	Ibrahim Hassan (GHA)	DNS
	Roberto Hernández (CUB)	DNS

== Qualifying heats ==
- Held on Saturday 1993-08-14

RANK	HEAT 1	TIME
1.	Michael Johnson (USA)	45.60
2.	Norberto Téllez (CUB)	45.79
3.	Ian Morris (TRI)	45.80
4.	Dmitriy Golovastov (RUS)	45.97
5.	Du'aine Ladejo (GBR)	46.17
6.	Gholamreza Sistani (IRI)	48.27
7.	Livingstone Roach (SKN)	48.72

RANK	HEAT 2	TIME
1.	Jean-Louis Rapnouil (FRA)	45.63
2.	Kennedy Ochieng (KEN)	45.68
3.	Roberto Hernández (CUB)	46.01
4.	Andrea Nuti (ITA)	46.59
5.	Keteng Baloseng (BOT)	47.93
	Slobodan Branković (IWP)	DNS
	Ilir Xhani (ALB)	DNS

RANK	HEAT 3	TIME
1.	Sunday Bada (NGR)	45.98
2.	Greg Haughton (JAM)	46.10
3.	Patrick Delice (TRI)	46.16
4.	Sadek Boumendil (ALG)	46.37
5.	Shigekazu Omori (JPN)	47.17
6.	Roger Jordan (BAR)	47.75
7.	Francisco Flores (HON)	50.86

RANK	HEAT 4	TIME
1.	Simon Kemboi (KEN)	45.91
2.	Quincy Watts (USA)	45.94
3.	Ibrahim Hassan (GHA)	46.61
4.	Benyounés Lahlou (MAR)	46.64
5.	Jean-Claude Yekpe (BEN)	46.92
6.	Raymundo Escalante (MEX)	48.03
7.	Stephen Lugor (SUD)	48.72

RANK	HEAT 5	TIME
1.	Butch Reynolds (USA)	45.34
2.	Ibrahim Ismail Muftah (QAT)	45.48
3.	Solomon Amegatcher (GHA)	45.68
4.	Ade Mafe (GBR)	46.25
5.	Francis Ogola (UGA)	46.53
6.	Anton Ivanov (BUL)	46.84
	Baobo Neuendorf (PNG)	DNF

RANK	HEAT 6	TIME
1.	Samson Kitur (KEN)	45.71
2.	Neil de Silva (TRI)	45.74
3.	Evon Clarke (JAM)	45.92
4.	Rico Lieder (GER)	46.06
5.	Troy Douglas (BER)	46.17
6.	Cayetano Cornet (ESP)	46.57
7.	Kossi Akoto (TOG)	47.91

== See also ==
- 1990 Men's European Championships 400 metres (Split)
- 1991 Men's World Championships 400 metres (Tokyo)
- 1992 Men's Olympic Games 400 metres (Barcelona)
- 1994 Men's European Championships 400 metres (Helsinki)
- 1995 Men's World Championships 400 metres (Gothenburg)
- 1996 Men's Olympic Games 400 metres (Atlanta)
