= Athletics at the 1995 Summer Universiade – Men's 400 metres =

The men's 400 metres event at the 1995 Summer Universiade was held on 31 August – 1 September at the Hakatanomori Athletic Stadium in Fukuoka, Japan.

== Medalists ==
Gold	Silver	Bronze
Eswort Coombs; Saint Vincent and the Grenadines	Udeme Ekpeyong; Nigeria	Dmitriy Kosov; Russia

== Results ==
=== Heats ===
Qualification: First 3 of each heat (Q) and the next 5 fastest (q) qualified for the quarterfinals.

Rank	Heat	Athlete	Nationality	Time	Notes
1	4	Kenji Tabata	Japan	46.69	Q
2	6	Andre Morris	United States	46.74	Q
3	4	Dmitriy Kosov	Russia	46.78	Q
4	6	Samuel Tlala	South Africa	46.89	Q
5	5	Dennis Blake	Jamaica	46.99	Q
6	2	Innokentiy Zharov	Russia	47.07	Q
7	3	Udeme Ekpeyong	Nigeria	47.09	Q
8	5	Francis Dwira Darko	Ghana	47.10	Q
9	6	Evripides Demosthenous	Cyprus	47.11	Q
10	2	Masayoshi Kan	Japan	47.23	Q
11	7	Jared Deacon	Great Britain	47.27	Q
12	9	Linval Laird	Jamaica	47.35	Q
13	7	Eswort Coombs	Saint Vincent and the Grenadines	47.37	Q
14	3	Rampa Mosweu	Botswana	47.43	Q
15	8	Leonard Byrd	United States	47.53	Q
16	8	Valentin Kulbatskiy	Ukraine	47.54	Q
17	9	Vincent van Rooyen	Namibia	47.56	Q
18	5	Piotr Rysiukiewicz	Poland	47.57	Q
19	7	Pablo Escribá	Spain	47.58	Q
20	8	Mark Wilson	New Zealand	47.67	Q
21	4	Ingūns Svikliņš	Latvia	47.71	Q
22	7	Patrice Doucet	Canada	47.73	q
23	6	Vadim Ogiy	Ukraine	47.74	q
24	3	Julian Völkel	Germany	47.77	Q
25	5	Mark Ladbrook	Australia	47.78	q
26	1	Justice Dipeba	Botswana	47.80	Q
27	9	Arnaud Malherbe	South Africa	47.96	Q
28	1	Dan Monea	Romania	48.15	Q
29	2	Bülent Eren	Turkey	48.23	Q
30	4	Alberto Araujo	Mexico	48.35	q
31	1	David Grindley	Great Britain	48.36	Q
32	9	Declan Stack	Australia	48.37	q
33	5	Mariche Mohamed	Algeria	48.46	
34	1	Kunle Adejuyigbe	Nigeria	48.58	
35	7	Hamilton Mhlanga	Swaziland	48.88	
36	9	Sokol Shepeteja	Albania	48.94	
37	5	Cherno Sowe	Gambia	49.06	
38	6	Dean Sheddan	New Zealand	49.21	
39	8	Joaquin Casadella	Spain	49.28	
40	2	Peter Lawson	Canada	49.35	
41	4	Immanuel Kharigub	Namibia	49.58	
42	4	Gilbert Tuhabonye	Burundi	49.70	
43	7	Bendaoud Faissoil	Comoros	50.20	
44	5	Shushan Masauda	Libya	50.21	
45	1	Choi Wai Kin	Hong Kong	50.86	
46	3	Jassim Al-Yousuf	United Arab Emirates	51.13	
47	4	Naseer Ismail	Maldives	51.15	
48	2	Fred Baramaga	Uganda	51.26	
49	3	Wong Pui Hung	Hong Kong	51.33	
50	9	Erick Moga	Solomon Islands	52.18	
51	6	Halahapperumage Fonseka	Sri Lanka	52.94	
52	9	Lai Ka Hou	Macau	53.74	
53	7	Ahmed Hamdan	Sudan	55.00	
54	2	Emanuel Andrade	Cape Verde	55.08	
55	1	Gábor Kiss	Hungary	1:11.03	
	3	Miklós Gyulai	Hungary	DNF	
	6	Moussa Mahaman	Niger	DQ	
	1	Ouahid Ketite	Algeria	DNS	
	2	Francis Opore	Kenya	DNS	
	2	Boris Kaveshnikov	Kyrgyzstan	DNS	
	3	Achebe Hope	Barbados	DNS	
	5	Maurice Otieno	Kenya	DNS	
	8	Roger Mathauius	British Virgin Islands	DNS	
	8	Paul Debs	Lebanon	DNS	
	8	Mario Bonello	Malta	DNS	

=== Quarterfinals ===
Qualification: First 4 of each heat qualified directly (Q) for the semifinals.

Rank	Heat	Athlete	Nationality	Time	Notes
1	2	Valentin Kulbatskiy	Ukraine	46.03	Q
2	1	Udeme Ekpeyong	Nigeria	46.10	Q
3	3	Andre Morris	United States	46.26	Q
4	4	Eswort Coombs	Saint Vincent and the Grenadines	46.32	Q
5	2	Arnaud Malherbe	South Africa	46.41	Q
6	1	Innokentiy Zharov	Russia	46.43	Q
7	3	Dmitriy Kosov	Russia	46.50	Q
7	4	Dennis Blake	Jamaica	46.50	Q
9	1	Masayoshi Kan	Japan	46.54	Q
10	1	Piotr Rysiukiewicz	Poland	46.56	Q
11	2	Leonard Byrd	United States	46.59	Q
12	2	Julian Völkel	Germany	46.66	Q
13	4	Jared Deacon	Great Britain	46.70	Q
14	4	Samuel Tlala	South Africa	46.73	Q
15	2	Kenji Tabata	Japan	46.76	
16	3	David Grindley	Great Britain	46.86	Q
17	1	Pablo Escribá	Spain	47.02	
18	3	Rampa Mosweu	Botswana	47.03	Q
19	3	Linval Laird	Jamaica	47.05	
20	4	Evripides Demosthenous	Cyprus	47.13	
21	3	Ingūns Svikliņš	Latvia	47.22	
22	4	Mark Ladbrook	Australia	47.24	
23	2	Declan Stack	Australia	47.55	
23	3	Dan Monea	Romania	47.55	
25	4	Mark Wilson	New Zealand	47.64	
26	1	Patrice Doucet	Canada	47.85	
27	3	Bülent Eren	Turkey	47.96	
28	2	Justice Dipeba	Botswana	48.13	
29	4	Alberto Araujo	Mexico	48.61	
30	1	Francis Dwira Darko	Ghana	48.85	
31	2	Vincent van Rooyen	Namibia	49.22	
	1	Vadim Ogiy	Ukraine	DNF	

=== Semifinals ===
Qualification: First 4 of each semifinal qualified directly (Q) for the final.

Rank	Heat	Athlete	Nationality	Time	Notes
1	2	Valentin Kulbatskiy	Ukraine	45.11	Q, NR
2	2	Eswort Coombs	Saint Vincent and the Grenadines	45.54	Q
3	1	Udeme Ekpeyong	Nigeria	45.59	Q
4	2	Dmitriy Kosov	Russia	45.66	Q
5	2	Arnaud Malherbe	South Africa	45.94	Q
6	1	Andre Morris	United States	46.06	Q
7	2	David Grindley	Great Britain	46.15	
8	1	Innokentiy Zharov	Russia	46.29	Q
9	1	Dennis Blake	Jamaica	46.31	Q
10	1	Jared Deacon	Great Britain	46.45	
11	1	Piotr Rysiukiewicz	Poland	46.49	
12	1	Julian Völkel	Germany	46.57	
13	2	Masayoshi Kan	Japan	46.73	
14	2	Leonard Byrd	United States	46.81	
15	2	Rampa Mosweu	Botswana	47.23	
16	1	Samuel Tlala	South Africa	47.24	

=== Final ===
Rank	Lane	Athlete	Nationality	Time	Notes
1st place, gold medalist(s)	6	Eswort Coombs	Saint Vincent and the Grenadines	45.38	
2nd place, silver medalist(s)	3	Udeme Ekpeyong	Nigeria	45.57	
3rd place, bronze medalist(s)	2	Dmitriy Kosov	Russia	45.70	
4	4	Valentin Kulbatskiy	Ukraine	45.84	
5	8	Dennis Blake	Jamaica	46.44	
6	1	Arnaud Malherbe	South Africa	46.60	
7	7	Innokentiy Zharov	Russia	46.63	
8	5	Andre Morris	United States	47.28	
