= Athletics at the 1992 Summer Olympics – Men's 400 metres =

Men's 400 metres at the Games of the XXV Olympiad
- Venue: Estadi Olímpic de Montjuïc
- Dates: 1 August 1992 (heats); 2 August 1992 (quarter-finals); 3 August 1992 (semi-finals); 5 August 1992 (final)
- Competitors: 69 from 52 nations
- Winning time: 43.50 OR

Medalists
1st place, gold medalist(s)		Quincy Watts; United States
2nd place, silver medalist(s)		Steve Lewis; United States
3rd place, bronze medalist(s)		Samson Kitur; Kenya

Official Video Highlights

The men's 400 metres was an event at the 1992 Summer Olympics in Barcelona, Spain. There were a total number of 68 participating athletes from 52 nations, with nine qualifying heats. The maximum number of athletes per nation had been set at 3 since the 1930 Olympic Congress. The event was won by Quincy Watts of the United States, the third in what would ultimately be seven consecutive American victories stretching from 1984 to 2008 and the 15th overall title in the event by the United States. Steve Lewis became the third man (and first American) to win a second medal in the event. Samson Kitur earned Kenya's first medal in the men's 400 metres since 1972.

In heat 1 of the semifinal round, Derek Redmond tore his hamstring 150 meters into the race. His father, Jim, rushed onto the track and supported Redmond as he limped to the finish line. Redmond was disqualified due to outside assistance, but the crowd gave him a standing ovation. The incident became one of the best-remembered moments in Olympic history.

In heat 2 of the semi-final round, Quincy Watts set an Olympic record with 43.71. This was the second-fastest time in history, behind only the world record held by Butch Reynolds. The previous second-fastest time had been run by Danny Everett at the United States Olympic Trials, where Reynolds did not qualify for the Olympics. In the Olympic semi-finals, Everett suffered a foot injury and hobbled to the finish. In the final, Watts won the gold medal and improved his Olympic record to 43.50.

== Background ==
This was the 22nd appearance of the event, which is one of 12 athletics events to have been held at every Summer Olympics. Defending gold medalist Steve Lewis and bronze medalist Danny Everett of the United States, but Quincy Watts beat silver medalist Butch Reynolds at the U.S. Olympic trials to take the third spot. Roger Black of Great Britain had taken silver at the 1991 world championship.

Angola, the Central African Republic, Costa Rica, Grenada, Lesotho, Mauritania, and Qatar appeared in this event for the first time. The Unified Team, consisting of some former Soviet republics, competed in the only Summer Games the Unified Team existed. One Yugoslav athlete competed as an "Independent Olympic Participant." The United States made its 21st appearance, most of any nation, having missed only the boycotted 1980 Games.

== Competition format ==
The competition retained the basic four-round format from 1920. The "fastest loser" system, introduced in 1964, was used for the first round. There were 9 first-round heats, each with 7 or 8 runners. The top three runners in each heat advanced, along with the next five fastest overall. The 32 quarterfinalists were divided into 4 quarterfinals with 8 runners each; the top four athletes in each quarterfinal heat advanced to the semifinals, with no "fastest loser" spots. The semifinals featured 2 heats of 8 runners each. The top four runners in each semifinal heat advanced, making an eight-man final.

== Records ==
These were the standing world and Olympic records (in seconds) prior to the 1976 Summer Olympics.

World record	Butch Reynolds (USA)	43.29	Zürich, Switzerland	17 August 1988
Olympic record	Lee Evans (USA)	43.86	Mexico City, Mexico	18 October 1968

Quincy Watts set two new Olympic records. He first ran 43.71 in the semifinals and improved his mark in the final to 43.50.

The following national records were established during the competition:

Nation	Athlete	Round	Time
Central African Republic	Martial Biguet	Heat 3	47.82

== Schedule ==
Following the 1984 schedule, the event was held on four separate days, with each round being on a different day.

All times are Central European Summer Time (UTC+2)

Date	Time	Round
Saturday, 1 August 1992	10:00	Round 1
Sunday, 2 August 1992	19:15	Quarterfinals
Monday, 3 August 1992	19:15	Semifinals
Wednesday, 5 August 1992	20:35	Final

== Results ==
=== Round 1 ===
==== Heat 1 ====
Rank	Lane	Athlete	Nation	Time	Notes
1	4	Derek Redmond	Great Britain	45.03	Q
2	5	Roberto Hernández	Cuba	45.07	Q
3	6	Solomon Amegatcher	Ghana	45.42	Q
4	3	Dennis Blake	Jamaica	45.92	q
5	7	Aktawat Sakoolchan	Thailand	46.78	
6	1	Ali Faudet	Chad	47.10	
7	2	Jaime Rodrigues	Mozambique	48.89	

==== Heat 2 ====
Rank	Lane	Athlete	Nation	Time	Notes
1	5	Troy Douglas	Bermuda	46.02	Q
2	2	Alvin Daniel	Trinidad and Tobago	46.09	Q
3	6	Thomas Schönlebe	Germany	46.26	Q
4	8	Seibert Straughn	Barbados	46.54	
5	1	Delon Felix	Grenada	47.39	
6	4	Mohamed Al-Malky	Oman	48.00	
7	7	Randolph Foster	Costa Rica	48.80	
8	3	Vanxay Sinebandith	Laos	51.71	

==== Heat 3 ====
Rank	Lane	Athlete	Nation	Time	Notes
1	4	Quincy Watts	United States	45.38	Q
2	5	Bobang Phiri	South Africa	45.57	Q
3	1	Rico Lieder	Germany	45.86	Q
4	2	Francis Ogola	Uganda	45.87	q
5	6	Ediélson Tenório	Brazil	46.31	q
6	7	Kossi Akoto	Togo	46.97	
7	3	Martial Biguet	Central African Republic	47.82	NR

==== Heat 4 ====
Rank	Lane	Athlete	Nation	Time	Notes
1	4	Simon Kemboi	Kenya	45.84	Q
2	1	Slobodan Branković	Independent Olympic Participants	46.34	Q
3	2	Devon Morris	Jamaica	46.45	Q
4	8	Patrick Delice	Trinidad and Tobago	46.58	
5	7	Subul Babo	Papua New Guinea	47.17	
6	5	Médard Makanga	Republic of the Congo	48.17	
7	3	Kenmore Hughes	Antigua and Barbuda	48.56	
8	6	Mohamed Amir	Maldives	50.35	

==== Heat 5 ====
Rank	Lane	Athlete	Nation	Time	Notes
1	3	Danny Everett	United States	45.68	Q
2	4	David Grindley	Great Britain	45.79	Q
3	8	Andrea Nuti	Italy	46.12	Q
4	6	Innocent Egbunike	Nigeria	46.51	
5	1	Dmitry Kosov	Unified Team	47.28	
6	2	Joseph Adam	Seychelles	47.68	
7	7	Baptiste Firiam	Vanuatu	48.98	
8	5	Eulogio Ngache	Equatorial Guinea	50.83	

==== Heat 6 ====
Rank	Lane	Athlete	Nation	Time	Notes
1	7	Samson Kitur	Kenya	45.41	Q
2	5	Susumu Takano	Japan	45.96	Q
3	6	Tamás Molnár	Hungary	46.21	Q
4	2	Anthony Wallace	Jamaica	46.88	
5	4	Camera Ntereke	Botswana	47.32	
6	3	Michael Joseph	Belize	50.90	
—	1	Desai Wynter	Virgin Islands	DNF	
—	8	Lamin Marikong	The Gambia	DSQ	

==== Heat 7 ====
Rank	Lane	Athlete	Nation	Time	Notes
1	3	Ian Morris	Trinidad and Tobago	45.65	Q
2	6	Benyounes Lahlou	Morocco	45.73	Q
3	4	David Kitur	Kenya	46.22	Q
4	5	Mark Garner	Australia	46.26	q
5	7	Apisai Driu Baibai	Fiji	47.81	
6	1	Henry Mohoanyane	Lesotho	48.39	
7	2	Mohamed Mehdi Hasan	Bangladesh	48.62	

==== Heat 8 ====
Rank	Lane	Athlete	Nation	Time	Notes
1	3	Steve Lewis	United States	45.14	Q
2	6	Sunday Bada	Nigeria	45.38	Q
3	4	Sidnei de Souza	Brazil	45.92	Q
4	5	Cayetano Cornet	Spain	46.13	q
5	7	Tim Hesse	Ghana	46.67	
6	1	Michael McLean	Canada	47.75	
7	2	Samba Fall	Mauritania	50.91	

==== Heat 9 ====
Rank	Lane	Athlete	Nation	Time	Notes
1	4	Ibrahim Ismail Muftah	Qatar	45.21	Q
2	3	Roger Black	Great Britain	45.94	Q
3	5	Cephas Lemba	Zambia	45.94	Q
4	1	Marco Vaccari	Italy	46.37	
5	7	Takahiro Watanabe	Japan	46.45	
6	2	Foday Sillah	Sierra Leone	47.00	
7	8	João Francisco Capindica	Angola	47.44	
8	6	Stephen Lugor	Sudan	48.94	

=== Quarterfinals ===
==== Quarterfinal 1 ====
Rank	Lane	Athlete	Nation	Time	Notes
1	5	Steve Lewis	United States	44.54	Q
2	3	Roberto Hernández	Cuba	44.84	Q
3	4	Roger Black	Great Britain	45.28	Q
4	6	Simon Kemboi	Kenya	45.40	Q
5	8	Thomas Schönlebe	Germany	45.46	
6	1	Slobodan Branković	Independent Olympic Participants	45.90	
7	7	Andrea Nuti	Italy	45.96	
8	2	Mark Garner	Australia	46.85	

==== Quarterfinal 2 ====
Rank	Lane	Athlete	Nation	Time	Notes
1	4	Derek Redmond	Great Britain	45.02	Q
2	6	Susumu Takano	Japan	45.27	Q
3	5	Troy Douglas	Bermuda	45.67	Q
4	3	Danny Everett	United States	45.76	Q
5	1	David Kitur	Kenya	46.25	
6	2	Ediélson Tenório	Brazil	46.34	
7	7	Alvin Daniel	Trinidad and Tobago	46.44	
8	8	Tamás Molnár	Hungary	46.80	

==== Quarterfinal 3 ====
Rank	Lane	Athlete	Nation	Time	Notes
1	5	Ian Morris	Trinidad and Tobago	44.78	Q
2	8	David Grindley	Great Britain	44.91	Q
3	3	Ibrahim Ismail Muftah	Qatar	45.18	Q
4	4	Sunday Bada	Nigeria	45.34	Q
5	7	Devon Morris	Jamaica	45.67	
6	2	Cayetano Cornet	Spain	46.27	
—	6	Solomon Amegatcher	Ghana	DNF	
—	1	Cephas Lemba	Zambia	DNF	

==== Quarterfinal 4 ====
Rank	Lane	Athlete	Nation	Time	Notes
1	5	Samson Kitur	Kenya	44.66	Q
2	3	Quincy Watts	United States	45.06	Q
3	6	Bobang Phiri	South Africa	45.27	Q
4	4	Benyounes Lahlou	Morocco	45.38	Q
5	2	Sidney Telles	Brazil	45.55	
6	1	Rico Lieder	Germany	45.86	
7	7	Francis Ogola	Uganda	46.21	
8	8	Dennis Blake	Jamaica	46.49	

=== Semifinals ===
==== Semifinal 1 ====
Redmond was injured and did not finish without assistance.

Rank	Lane	Athlete	Nation	Time	Notes
1	3	Steve Lewis	United States	44.50	Q
2	4	Roberto Hernández	Cuba	44.72	Q
3	6	Ibrahim Ismail Muftah	Qatar	45.01	Q
4	1	Susumu Takano	Japan	45.09	Q
5	2	Sunday Bada	Nigeria	45.36	
6	7	Troy Douglas	Bermuda	45.59	
7	8	Simon Kemboi	Kenya	45.93	
—	5	Derek Redmond	Great Britain	DNF	

==== Semifinal 2 ====
Rank	Lane	Athlete	Nation	Time	Notes
1	6	Quincy Watts	United States	43.71	Q, OR
2	3	Samson Kitur	Kenya	44.18	Q
3	4	Ian Morris	Trinidad and Tobago	44.21	Q
4	5	David Grindley	Great Britain	44.47	Q
5	7	Roger Black	Great Britain	44.72	
6	1	Benyounes Lahlou	Morocco	45.49	
7	2	Bobang Phiri	South Africa	45.59	
8	8	Danny Everett	United States	56.61	

=== Final ===
The final was held on August 5, 1992.

Rank	Lane	Athlete	Nation	Time	Notes
1st place, gold medalist(s)	4	Quincy Watts	United States	43.50	OR
2nd place, silver medalist(s)	7	Steve Lewis	United States	44.21	
3rd place, bronze medalist(s)	5	Samson Kitur	Kenya	44.24	
4	6	Ian Morris	Trinidad and Tobago	44.25	
5	2	Roberto Hernández	Cuba	44.52	
6	3	David Grindley	Great Britain	44.75	
7	1	Ibrahim Ismail Muftah	Qatar	45.10	
8	8	Susumu Takano	Japan	45.18	

== See also ==
- 1988 Men's Olympic Games 400 metres (Seoul)
- 1990 Men's European Championships 400 metres (Split)
- 1991 Men's World Championships 400 metres (Tokyo)
- 1993 Men's World Championships 400 metres (Stuttgart)
- 1994 Men's European Championships 400 metres (Helsinki)
- 1995 Men's World Championships 400 metres (Gothenburg)
- 1996 Men's Olympic Games 400 metres (Atlanta)
