= 1991 Central American and Caribbean Championships in Athletics =

- Dates: 26–28 July
- Host city: Xalapa, Veracruz, Mexico
- Venue: Estadio Heriberto Jara Corona

The 1991 Central American and Caribbean Championships in Athletics were held at the Estadio Heriberto Jara Corona in Xalapa, Veracruz, Mexico between 26–28 July.

== Medal summary ==
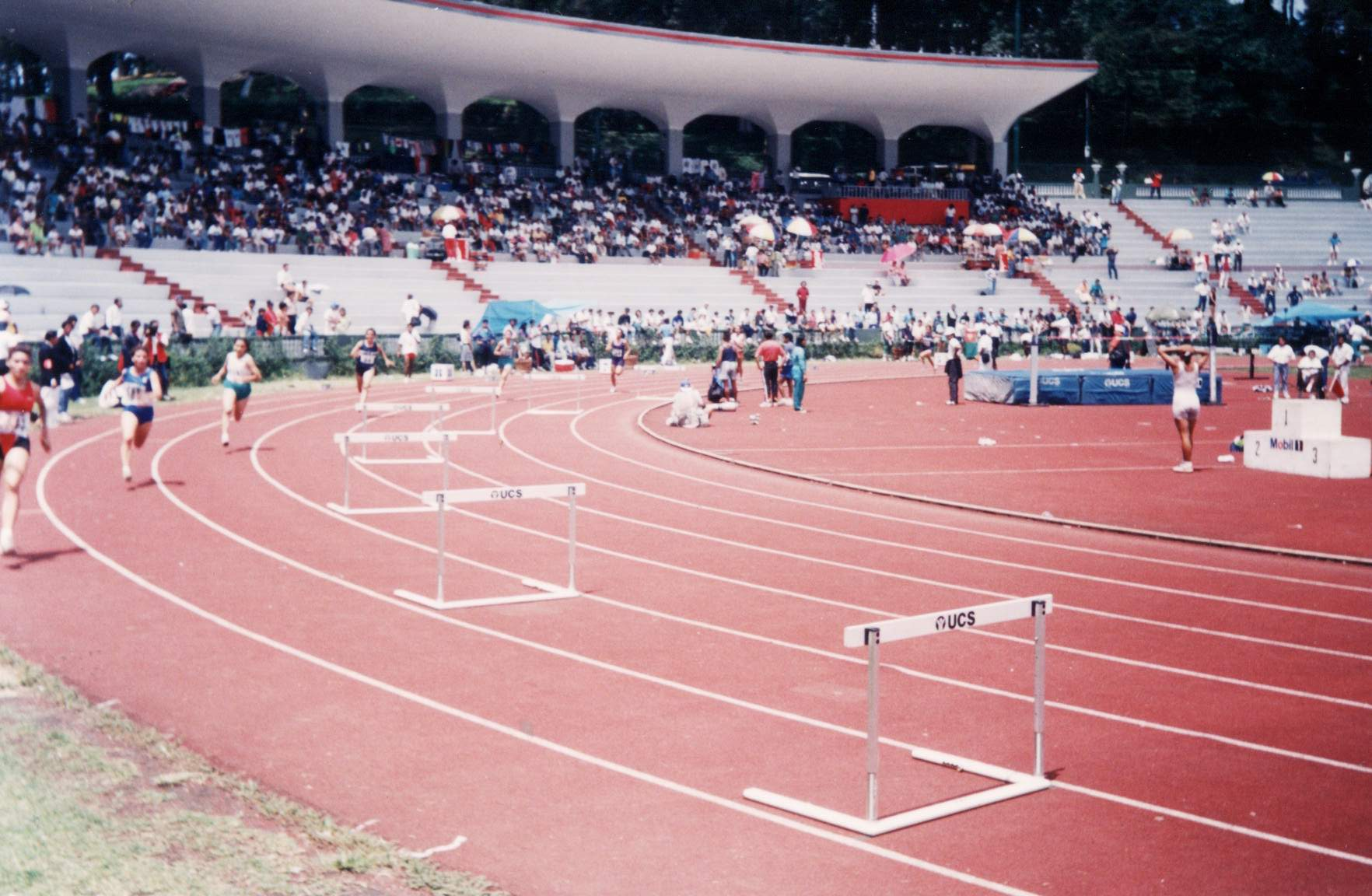
Host venue in Xalapa.

=== Men's events ===
Event	Gold		Silver		Bronze	
100 metres (wind: -0.4 m/s)	John Mair; Jamaica	10.56A	Eduardo Nava; Mexico	10.70A	Henrico Atkins; Barbados	10.74A
200 metres (wind: +1.3 m/s)	Windell Dobson; Jamaica	21.22A	Joseph Styles; Bahamas	21.38A	Eduardo Nava; Mexico	21.39A
400 metres	Seymour Fagan; Jamaica	46.11A	Carmel Walderon; Dominica	46.56A	Anthony Wallace; Jamaica	46.76A
800 metres	Stevon Roberts; Barbados	1:49.63A	Luis Toledo; Mexico	1:49.79A	Leobardo Pérez; Mexico	1:50.27A
1500 metres	Linton McKenzie; Jamaica	3:48.83A	Sergio Rodríguez; Mexico	3:49.09A	Gilberto Merchant; Mexico	3:51.71A
5000 metres	Armando Quintanilla; Mexico	14:17.00A	Rubén García; Mexico	14:27.93A	Alberto Paredes; Guatemala	14:48.73A
10,000 metres	Dionicio Cerón; Mexico	29:28.81A CR	Isaac García; Mexico	29:52.59A	Alberto Paredes; Guatemala	30:38.28A
110 metres hurdles (wind: -3.8 m/s)	Anthony Knight; Jamaica	14.29A	Roberto Carmona; Mexico	14.66A	Armando Jiménez; Mexico	15.23A
400 metres hurdles	Domingo Cordero; Puerto Rico	49.12A CR	Mark Thompson; Jamaica	51.52A	Raúl Huitrón; Mexico	51.60A
3000 metres steeplechase	Adalberto Vélez; Mexico	9:00.20A	Héctor Arias; Mexico	9:12.10A	Dagoberto Yumán; Panama	9:41.70A
4 × 100 metres relay	Mexico; Eduardo Nava; Genaro Rojas; Jaime López; Herman Adam	39.99A	Jamaica; Windell Dobson; John Mair; Donovan Powell; Aston Morgan	40.33A	Barbados; Henrico Atkins; Terry Harewood; Seibert Straughn; Ronald Thorne	40.59A
4 × 400 metres relay	Barbados; Terry Harewood; Stevon Roberts; Seibert Straughn; Ronald Thorne	3:06.08A	Mexico; Raymundo Escalante; Eduardo Nava; Juan Josué Morales; Juan Jesús Guttiérez	3:07.74A	Jamaica; Seymour Fagan; Mark Thompson; Anthony Wallace; Aston Morgan	3:08.14A
20 km road walk	Alberto Cruz; Mexico	1:27:09A CR	Víctor Sánchez; Mexico	1:30:10A	José León; El Salvador	1:41:53A
High jump	Carlos Arzuaga; Puerto Rico	2.11A	Jorge Martínez; Mexico	2.05A	Alberto Valdéz; Mexico	1.95A
Pole vault	Edgar Díaz; Puerto Rico	5.39A CR	Antonio García; Mexico	4.90A	Guillermo Salgado; Mexico	4.90A
Long jump	Elmer Williams; Puerto Rico	7.94A	Ron Chambers; Jamaica	7.88Aw	Craig Hepburn; Bahamas	7.71Aw
Triple jump	Wendell Lawrence; Bahamas	16.79A	Edward Cruden; Suriname	15.70A	Gerardo Guevara; Mexico	15.37A
Shot put	Francisco Ball; Puerto Rico	17.50A	Carlos Rodríguez; Mexico	14.93A	Jaime Comandari; El Salvador	14.80A
Discus throw	Herbert Rodríguez; El Salvador	46.46A	Francisco Ayala; Mexico	44.74A	Dave Grant; Jamaica	42.04A
Hammer throw	Guillermo Guzmán; Mexico	64.58A	Julián Núñez Ríos; Mexico	45.62A	Daniel Marcial; Mexico	45.00A
Javelin throw	Juan de la Garza; Mexico	75.78A	Martín Castillo; Mexico	69.92A	Kevin Smith; Bahamas	64.46A
Decathlon	José Román; Puerto Rico	6438A	Armando Jiménez; Mexico	6101A		

=== Women's events ===
Event	Gold		Silver		Bronze	
100 metres (wind: -1.1 m/s)	Cheryl-Ann Phillips; Jamaica	11.83A	Andria Lloyd; Jamaica	11.91A	Alejandra Flores; Mexico	12.18A
200 metres	Merlene Frazer; Jamaica	23.63A	Vivienne Spence; Jamaica	24.03A	Alma Vázquez; Mexico	25.08A
400 metres	Cathy Rattray-Williams; Jamaica	53.37A	Catherine Scott; Jamaica	53.39A	Jessica de la Cruz; Puerto Rico	55.38A
800 metres	Angelita Lind; Puerto Rico	2:05.96A	Cathy Rattray-Williams; Jamaica	2:07.43A	Irma Betancourt; Mexico	2:07.44A
1500 metres	María Luisa Servín; Mexico	4:26.98A	Angelita Lind; Puerto Rico	4:31.65A	Bigna Samuel; Saint Vincent and the Grenadines	4:32.61A
3000 metres	María Luisa Servín; Mexico	9:28.02A CR	Benita Pérez; Mexico	9:51.22A	Trinidad Galeana; Mexico	9:46.98A
10,000 metres	Paola Carrera; Mexico	35:02.10A CR	Benita Pérez; Mexico	35:04.75A	Trinidad Galeana; Mexico	35:31.92A
100 metres hurdles (wind: -1.0 m/s)	Gillian Russell; Jamaica	13.99A	Dionne Rose; Jamaica	14.00A	Mariana Carmona; Mexico	15.03A
400 metres hurdles	Deon Hemmings; Jamaica	57.64A CR	Kareth Smith; Jamaica	59.19A	Larissa Soto; Guatemala	59.79A (NR)
4 × 100 metres relay	Jamaica; Merlene Frazer; Dionne Rose; Andria Lloyd; Cheryl-Ann Phillips	44.54A CR	Mexico; Alma Vázquez; Inés Pérez; Cristina Paniagua; Alejandra Flores	46.57A		
4 × 400 metres relay	Jamaica; Cathy Rattray-Williams; Catherine Scott; Vivienne Spence; Kareth Smith	3:38.18A	Mexico; Lidia Medina; Erendira Villagómez; Violeta Navarro; Alejandra Quintanar	3:48.16A		
10,000 m track walk	María Colín; Mexico	49:15.94A	Eva Machuca; Mexico	50:02.72A	Rosario Sánchez; Mexico	51:45.99A
High jump	Cristina Fink; Mexico	1.86A	Judy McDonald; Bahamas	1.76A	Rita Solís; Mexico	1.70A
Long jump	Flora Hyacinth; U.S. Virgin Islands	6.65A =CR	Dionne Rose; Jamaica	6.08A	Solange Ostiana; Netherlands Antilles	6.04Aw
Shot put	Lilliam Rivera; Puerto Rico	14.08A	Rosa Salas; Mexico	12.93A	Dulce Flores; Mexico	11.96A
Discus throw	Lilliam Rivera; Puerto Rico	48.52A	Laura Aguiñaga; Mexico	45.06A	Verónica Peña; Mexico	42.58A
Javelin throw	Laverne Eve; Bahamas	47.60A	Martha Blanco; Mexico	42.56A	Carolina Valenzuela; Mexico	41.68A
Heptathlon	Larissa Soto; Guatemala	4591A NR	Silvia Barreto; Mexico	4231Aw	Lourdes Villanueva; Mexico	3957Aw

A = affected by altitude

== Medal table ==
* Host nation (Mexico)

Rank	Nation	Gold	Silver	Bronze	Total
1	Mexico (MEX)*	12	25	21	58
2	Jamaica (JAM)	12	10	3	25
3	Puerto Rico (PUR)	9	1	1	11
4	Bahamas (BAH)	2	2	2	6
5	Barbados (BAR)	2	0	2	4
6	Guatemala (GUA)	1	0	3	4
7	El Salvador (ESA)	1	0	2	3
8	U.S. Virgin Islands (ISV)	1	0	0	1
9	Dominica (DMA)	0	1	0	1
9	Suriname (SUR)	0	1	0	1
11	Netherlands Antilles (AHO)	0	0	1	1
11	Panama (PAN)	0	0	1	1
11	Saint Vincent and the Grenadines (VIN)	0	0	1	1
Totals (13 entries)		40	40	37	117

== See also ==
- 1991 in athletics (track and field)
