= 1992 World Junior Championships in Athletics – Men's 400 metres =

The men's 400 metres event at the 1992 World Junior Championships in Athletics was held in Seoul, South Korea, at Olympic Stadium on 16, 17 and 18 September.

== Medalists ==
Gold	Deon Minor; United States
Silver	Rikard Rasmusson; Sweden
Bronze	Francis Ogola; Uganda

== Results ==
=== Final ===
18 September

Rank	Name	Nationality	Time	Notes
1st place, gold medalist(s)	Deon Minor	United States	45.75	
2nd place, silver medalist(s)	Rikard Rasmusson	Sweden	46.07	
3rd place, bronze medalist(s)	Francis Ogola	Uganda	46.16	
4	Udeme Ekpeyong	Nigeria	46.54	
5	Carl Southam	United Kingdom	46.74	
6	Emmanuel Okoli	Nigeria	46.78	
7	Guy Bullock	United Kingdom	46.81	
8	Milton Mallard	United States	47.46	

=== Semifinals ===
17 September

==== Semifinal 1 ====
Rank	Name	Nationality	Time	Notes
1	Deon Minor	United States	46.12	Q
2	Carl Southam	United Kingdom	46.59	Q
3	Emmanuel Okoli	Nigeria	46.73	q
4	Delon Felix	Grenada	47.41	
5	Declan Stack	Australia	47.59	
6	Carl McPherson	Jamaica	47.94	
7	Hezron Maina	Kenya	48.27	
8	Chen Ming-Yih	Chinese Taipei	50.75	

==== Semifinal 2 ====
Rank	Name	Nationality	Time	Notes
1	Rikard Rasmusson	Sweden	46.46	Q
2	Udeme Ekpeyong	Nigeria	46.62	Q
3	Milton Mallard	United States	46.77	q
4	Takayuki Sudo	Japan	47.11	
5	Foday Sillah	Sierra Leone	47.54	
6	Steven Kingston	Australia	47.84	
7	David Anderson	Canada	48.18	
8	Bekele Ergego	Ethiopia	48.51	

==== Semifinal 3 ====
Rank	Name	Nationality	Time	Notes
1	Francis Ogola	Uganda	46.66	Q
2	Guy Bullock	United Kingdom	46.74	Q
3	Arthémon Hatungimana	Burundi	46.78	
4	Mark Graham	Canada	47.16	
5	Hiroyuki Hayashi	Japan	47.50	
6	Marcus Rau	Germany	47.51	
7	Michele D'Angelo	Italy	48.39	
	Greg Haughton	Jamaica	DQ	IAAF rule 162.7

=== Heats ===
16 September

==== Heat 1 ====
Rank	Name	Nationality	Time	Notes
1	Milton Mallard	United States	47.35	Q
2	Takayuki Sudo	Japan	47.59	Q
3	Rikard Rasmusson	Sweden	47.60	Q
4	Greg Haughton	Jamaica	47.73	Q
5	Michele D'Angelo	Italy	47.94	q
6	Steven Kingston	Australia	47.98	q
7	Nick Cowan	New Zealand	48.32	
8	Ronaldo dos Anjos	Brazil	48.69	

==== Heat 2 ====
Rank	Name	Nationality	Time	Notes
1	Arthémon Hatungimana	Burundi	47.31	Q
2	Carl McPherson	Jamaica	47.35	Q
3	Hezron Maina	Kenya	47.65	Q
4	Bekele Ergego	Ethiopia	48.99	Q
5	Eduardo Fernández	Mexico	49.57	
6	Salem Nasser Hawas Jaman	Saudi Arabia	49.62	
7	Sanderlei Parrela	Brazil	49.64	

==== Heat 3 ====
Rank	Name	Nationality	Time	Notes
1	Deon Minor	United States	46.63	Q
2	Carl Southam	United Kingdom	47.05	Q
3	Emmanuel Okoli	Nigeria	47.26	Q
4	Foday Sillah	Sierra Leone	47.80	Q
5	Chen Ming-Yih	Chinese Taipei	48.30	q
6	Lee Un-Hak	South Korea	48.59	
7	Shaun Farrell	New Zealand	48.68	

==== Heat 4 ====
Rank	Name	Nationality	Time	Notes
1	Udeme Ekpeyong	Nigeria	47.05	Q
2	Mark Graham	Canada	47.61	Q
3	Hiroyuki Hayashi	Japan	47.81	Q
4	Delon Felix	Grenada	48.02	Q
5	Julian Voelkel	Germany	48.39	
6	Simon Kipkemboi	Kenya	49.02	

==== Heat 5 ====
Rank	Name	Nationality	Time	Notes
1	Francis Ogola	Uganda	47.22	Q
2	Marcus Rau	Germany	47.62	Q
3	David Anderson	Canada	47.68	Q
4	Declan Stack	Australia	48.07	Q
5	Guy Bullock	United Kingdom	48.27	q
6	Masoud Al-Rahman	Qatar	48.40	
7	Mariusz Obarek	Poland	48.92	

== Participation ==
According to an unofficial count, 35 athletes from 24 countries participated in the event.

- Australia (2)
- Brazil (2)
- Burundi (1)
- Canada (2)
- Chinese Taipei (1)
- Ethiopia (1)
- Germany (2)
- Grenada (1)
- Italy (1)
- Jamaica (2)
- Japan (2)
- Kenya (2)
- Mexico (1)
- New Zealand (2)
- Nigeria (2)
- Poland (1)
- Qatar (1)
- Saudi Arabia (1)
- Sierra Leone (1)
- South Korea (1)
- Sweden (1)
- Uganda (1)
- United Kingdom (2)
- United States (2)
