= 1993 World Championships in Athletics – Men's 4 × 400 metres relay =

These are the official results of the Men's 4 × 400 metres event at the 1993 IAAF World Championships in Stuttgart, Germany. There were a total number of eighteen participating nations, with three qualifying heats and the final held on Sunday, August 22, 1993. The current world record for the event was set in the final.

The winning margin was a colossal 5.53 seconds which as of June 2024 remains the only time the men's 4 × 400 metres relay was won by more than five seconds at these championships or the Olympic Games.

== Final ==
RANK	NATION	ATHLETES	TIME
	United States (USA)	• Andrew Valmon • Quincy Watts • Butch Reynolds • Michael Johnson	2:54.29
	Kenya (KEN)	• Kennedy Ochieng • Simon Kemboi • Abednego Matilu • Samson Kitur	2:59.82
	Germany (GER)	• Rico Lieder • Karsten Just • Olaf Hense • Thomas Schönlebe	2:59.99
4.	France (FRA)	• Jean-Louis Rapnouil • Pierre-Marie Hilaire • Jacques Farraudière • Stéphane Diagana	3:00.09
5.	Russia (RUS)	• Dmitriy Kliger • Dmitriy Kosov • Mikhail Vdovin • Dmitriy Golovastov	3:00.44
6.	Cuba (CUB)	• Iván García • Héctor Herrera • Norberto Téllez • Roberto Hernández	3:00.46
7.	Jamaica (JAM)	• Patrick O'Connor • Dennis Blake • Danny McFarlane • Greg Haughton	3:01.44
8.	Bulgaria (BUL)	• Stanislav Georgiev • Tsvetoslav Stankulov • Kiril Raykov • Anton Ivanov	3:05.35

== Qualifying heats ==
- Held on Saturday 1993-08-21

=== Heat 1 ===
RANK	NATION	ATHLETES	TIME
1.	Germany (GER)	• Karsten Just • Rico Lieder • Olaf Hense • Thomas Schönlebe	3:01.26
2.	Bulgaria (BUL)	• Stanislav Georgiev • Tsvetoslav Stankulov • Kiril Raykov • Anton Ivanov	3:01.61; NR
3.	Jamaica (JAM)	• Patrick O'Connor • Dennis Blake • Danny McFarlane • Greg Haughton	3:01.70
4.	Great Britain (GBR)	• Du'aine Ladejo • Guy Bullock • Wayne McDonald • Ade Mafe	3:02.15
5.	New Zealand (NZL)	• Shaun Farrell • Nick Cowan • Darren Dale • Mark Keddell	3:05.84; NR
6.	Thailand (THA)	• Chanond Keanchan • Sakorn Tongtip • Wirwat Poomipak • Yutthana Tonglek	3:08.60

=== Heat 2 ===
RANK	NATION	ATHLETES	TIME
1.	United States (USA)	• Andrew Valmon • Antonio Pettigrew • Derek Mills • Michael Johnson	2:58.72
2.	France (FRA)	• Jacques Farraudiére • Pierre-Marie Hilaire • Olivier Noirot • Jean-Louis Rapnouil	3:01.70
3.	Japan (JPN)	• Masayoshi Kan • Shunji Karube • Yoshihiko Saito • Tomonari Ono	3:02.43
4.	Algeria (ALG)	• Amar Hacini • Ismail Mariche • Kamel Talhaodi • Sadek Boumendil	3:03.63
5.	Mexico (MEX)	• Raymundo Escalante • Juan Vallin • Josue Morales • Luis Karin Toledo	3:08.37
	Trinidad and Tobago (TRI)		DNS

=== Heat 3 ===
RANK	NATION	ATHLETES	TIME
1.	Kenya (KEN)	• Abednego Matilu • Simon Kemboi • Samson Kitur • Kennedy Ochieng	3:00.82
2.	Cuba (CUB)	• Lázaro Martínez • Héctor Herrera • Norberto Téllez • Roberto Hernández	3:01.36
3.	Russia (RUS)	• Dmitriy Kliger • Dmitriy Kosov • Innokentiy Zharov • Dmitriy Golovastov	3:01.51
4.	Italy (ITA)	• Andrea Nuti • Andrea Montanari • Alessandro Aimar • Marco Vaccari	3:01.85
5.	Nigeria (NGR)	• Hassan Bosso • Emmanuel Okoli • Victor Omagbemi • Sunday Bada	3:02.64
	Uganda (UGA)		DNS

== See also ==
- 1988 Men's Olympic 4 × 400 m Relay (Seoul)
- 1990 Men's European Championships 4 × 400 m Relay (Split)
- 1991 Men's World Championships 4 × 400 m Relay (Tokyo)
- 1992 Men's Olympic 4 × 400 m Relay (Barcelona)
- 1994 Men's European Championships 4 × 400 m Relay (Helsinki)
- 1995 Men's World Championships 4 × 400 m Relay (Gothenburg)
