= Ojastu =

Ojastu is a surname. Notable people with the surname include:

- Aivar Ojastu (born 1961), Estonian athletics competitor
- Annely Ojastu (born 1960), Estonian Paralympic athlete
- Linda Ojastu (1936–2006), Estonian athletics competitor
