= Raykov =

Raykov is a surname. Notable people with the surname include:

- Georgi Raykov (1953–2006), Bulgarian wrestler
- Kiril Raykov (born 1969), Bulgarian sprinter
- Marin Raykov (born 1960), Bulgarian politician and diplomat
- Simeon Raykov (born 1989), Bulgarian footballer
