= Eulogio =

Eulogio may refer to:

- Eulogio (given name), people named Eulogio
- Eulogio Sánchez Airport, airport in Chile
- Doctor Juan Eulogio Estigarribia, city in Paraguay
- Eulogio "Amang" Rodriguez Institute of Science and Technology, college in the Philippines
