= Anthony Wallace =

Anthony Wallace is the name of:

- Anthony F. C. Wallace (1923–2015), anthropologist
- Anthony Wallace (soccer) (born 1989), American soccer player
- Anthony Wallace (sprinter) (born 1968), Jamaican Olympic sprinter
- Tony Wallace (EastEnders), a character in British soap opera EastEnders
- Tony Wallace (footballer) (born 1991), Scottish footballer
