= Norberto Téllez =

Cuban sprinter

Personal information
- Born: January 22, 1972 (age 54) Rodas, Cienfuegos, Cuba
Medal record
Men's athletics
Representing Cuba
Olympic Games
Silver medal – second place	1992 Barcelona	4x400 m relay
World Championships
Silver medal – second place	1997 Athens	800 m
Pan American Games
Gold medal – first place	1995 Mar del Plata	400 m
Summer Universiade
Gold medal – first place	1997 Catania	800 m
Gold medal – first place	1999 Palma de Mallorca	800 m
World Junior Championships
Bronze medal – third place	1990 Plovdiv	800 m
CAC Junior Championships (U20)
Gold medal – first place	1990 Havana	800 m
Silver medal – second place	1990 Havana	400 m
Silver medal – second place	1990 Havana	4x400 m relay

Norberto Téllez Santana (born January 22, 1972, in Rodas, Cienfuegos) is a retired Cuban runner.

== Career ==
Originally a 400 metres runner who also enjoyed success in 4 x 400 metres relay, winning the silver medal at the 1992 Olympics, Téllez later converted to the 800 metres distance. At the 1996 Summer Olympics he ran in 1:42.85 and thereby improved the national record of Alberto Juantorena. However, this wasn't enough to secure a medal as he finished in fourth place. A silver medal from the 1997 World Championships was his best result thereafter.

== Major achievements ==
Year	Competition	Venue	Position	Event	Notes
Representing Cuba
1990	Central American and Caribbean; Junior Championships (U20)	Havana, Cuba	2nd	400 m	47.22
1990	Central American and Caribbean; Junior Championships (U20)	Havana, Cuba	1st	800 m	1:50.08
1990	Central American and Caribbean; Junior Championships (U20)	Havana, Cuba	2nd	4 × 400 m relay	3:09.48
1990	World Junior Championships	Plovdiv, Bulgaria	3rd	800 m	1:47.33
1990	World Junior Championships	Plovdiv, Bulgaria	12th (h)	4 × 400 m relay	3:10.49
1991	Pan American Junior Championships	Kingston, Jamaica	8th	800 m	1:56.72
1991	Pan American Junior Championships	Kingston, Jamaica	2nd	4 × 400 m relay	3:09.19
1992	Ibero-American Championships	Seville, Spain	1st	4 × 400 m relay	3:01.58
1992	Olympic Games	Barcelona, Spain	2nd	4 × 400 m relay	2:59.51
1992	World Cup	Havana, Cuba	2nd	4 × 400 m relay	3:02.95^{1}
1993	Central American and Caribbean Championships	Cali, Colombia	3rd	400 m	46.25
1993	Central American and Caribbean Championships	Cali, Colombia	2nd	4 × 400 m relay	3:02.58
1993	World Championships	Stuttgart, Germany	14th (sf)	400 m	46.17
1993	World Championships	Stuttgart, Germany	6th	4 × 400 m relay	3:00.46
1993	Central American and Caribbean Games	Ponce, Puerto Rico	1st	400 m	45.80
1993	Central American and Caribbean Games	Ponce, Puerto Rico	1st	4 × 400 m relay	3:05.62
1994	Goodwill Games	St. Petersburg, Russia	7th	400 m	46.01
1994	Goodwill Games	St. Petersburg, Russia	2nd	4 × 400 m relay	3:01.87
1994	World Cup	London, United Kingdom	5th	4 × 400 m relay	3:04.28^{1}
1995	Pan American Games	Mar del Plata, Argentina	1st	400 m	45.38
1995	Pan American Games	Mar del Plata, Argentina	1st	4 × 400 m relay	3:01.53
1995	World Championships	Gothenburg, Sweden	15th (sf)	400 m	46.68
1995	World Championships	Gothenburg, Sweden	6th	4 × 400 m relay	3:07.65
1996	Ibero-American Championships	Medellín, Colombia	1st	800 m	1:45.83 CR
1996	Ibero-American Championships	Medellín, Colombia	1st	4 × 400 m relay	3:03.98
1996	Olympic Games	Atlanta, United States	4th	800 m	1:42.85 NR
1997	Central American and Caribbean Championships	San Juan, Puerto Rico	1st	800 m	1:47.78
1997	Central American and Caribbean Championships	San Juan, Puerto Rico	2nd	4 × 400 m relay	3:04.50
1997	World Championships	Athens, Greece	2nd	800 m	1:44.00 SB
1997	Universiade	Catania, Italy	1st	800 m	1:47.63
1998	Goodwill Games	Uniondale, United States	2nd	800 m	1:45.92
1998	Central American and Caribbean Games	Maracaibo, Venezuela	1st	800 m	1:49.71
1998	Central American and Caribbean Games	Maracaibo, Venezuela	1st	4 × 400 m relay	3:03.18
1998	World Cup	Johannesburg, South Africa	3rd	800 m	1:48.92^{1}
1999	World Indoor Championships	Maebashi, Japan	22nd (h)	800 m	1:52.38^{2}
1999	Universiade	Palma, Spain	1st	800 m	1:46.11
1999	Pan American Games	Winnipeg, Canada	2nd	800 m	1:45.40
1999	Pan American Games	Winnipeg, Canada	4th	4 × 400 m relay	3:01.79
1999	World Championships	Seville, Spain	4th	800 m	1:45.03
2001	Central American and Caribbean Championships	Guatemala City, Guatemala	1st	800 m	1:46.51

^{1}Representing the Americas
^{2}Did not finish in the semifinals

== Personal bests ==
- 200 metres – 21.10 (1994)
- 400 metres – 45.27 (1994)
- 800 metres – 1:42.85 (1996)
