= Eulogio (given name) =

Eulogio is a given name. Notable people with given name include:

- Eulogio Altamirano (1835–1903), Chilean soldier
- Eulogio Aranguren (1892–1972), Argentine footballer
- Eulogio Balao (1907–1977), Filipino soldier
- Eulogio Cantillo (1911–1978), major general in the Cuban Army
- Eulogio F. de Celis (died 1903), Californio ranchero
- Eulogio Despujol y Dusay (1834–1907), Spanish Governor-General of the Philippines
- José Eulogio Gárate (born 1944), Spanish footballer
- Eulogio Génova (born 1960), Spanish lightweight rower
- Eulogios Kourilas Lauriotis (1880–1961), Albanian bishop
- Eulogio Martínez (1935–1984), Paraguayan footballer
- Eulogio Ngache (born 1971), Equatoguinean sprinter
- Eulogio Oyó (1942–2013), Equatorial Guinean military leader
- Eulogio Robles Pinochet (1831–1891), Chilean military officer
- Eulogio Rodriguez (1883–1964), Filipino politician
- Eulogio Sandoval (1922—?), Bolivian footballer
- Eulogio Uribarri (1894–1972), Spanish footballer
- Eulogio Vargas (1931–2020), Argentine-born Bolivian footballer
- Eulogio Gillow y Zavalza (1841–1922), Mexican bishop
- José Eulogio Bonilla (born 1946), Mexican lawyer
