= Athletics at the 1995 Pan American Games – Men's 4 × 400 metres relay =

Men's 4 × 400 metres relay at the Pan American Games

The men's 4 × 400 metres relay event at the 1995 Pan American Games was held at the Estadio Atletico "Justo Roman" on 25 March.

== Results ==
Rank	Nation	Athletes	Time	Notes
1st place, gold medalist(s)	Cuba	Iván García, Jorge Crusellas, Omar Meña, Norberto Téllez	3:01.53	
2nd place, silver medalist(s)	Jamaica	Orville Taylor, Michael McDonald, Roxbert Martin, Dennis Blake	3:02.11	
3rd place, bronze medalist(s)	Trinidad and Tobago	Robert Guy, Neil de Silva, Hayden Stephen, Ian Morris	3:02.24	
4	Brazil	Éverson Teixeira, Eronilde de Araújo, José Luíz Barbosa, Inaldo Sena	3:07.54	
5	Mexico	Raymundo Escalante, Alejandro Cárdenas, Carlos Villaseñor, Miguel Miranda	3:08.04	
6	Argentina	Nicolas Rodríguez, Ceferino Mondino, Gustavo Aguirre, Guillermo Cacián	3:13.57	
	United States	Dino Napier, Tony Miller, Wendell Gaskin, Kevin Lyles	DNF	
