= Athletics at the 1995 Pan American Games – Men's 400 metres =

Men's 400 metres at the Pan American Games

The men's 400 metres event at the 1995 Pan American Games was held at the Estadio Atletico "Justo Roman" on 18 and 19 March.

== Medalists ==
Gold	Silver	Bronze
Norberto Téllez; Cuba	Omar Mena; Cuba	Eswort Coombs; Saint Vincent and the Grenadines

== Results ==
=== Heats ===
Rank	Heat	Name	Nationality	Time	Notes
1	2	Omar Meña	Cuba	46.23	Q
2	2	Chris Jones	United States	46.24	Q
3	2	Michael McDonald	Jamaica	46.26	q
4	1	Norberto Téllez	Cuba	46.29	Q
5	3	Ian Morris	Trinidad and Tobago	46.61	Q
6	3	Eswort Coombs	Saint Vincent and the Grenadines	46.64	Q
7	3	Wendell Gaskin	United States	46.66	q
8	1	Wenceslao Ferrín	Colombia	46.91	Q
9	1	Orville Taylor	Jamaica	46.91	
10	2	Inaldo Sena	Brazil	46.96	
11	2	Llimy Rivas	Colombia	47.32	
12	3	Raymundo Escalante	Mexico	47.60	
13	1	Alvin Daniel	Trinidad and Tobago	47.75	
14	1	Delon Felix	Grenada	48.54	
15	2	Guillermo Cacián	Argentina	48.81	
16	3	Gustavo Aguirre	Argentina	48.84	
17	3	Elroy Shaw	Belize	54.24	
	1	Kenmore Hughes	Antigua and Barbuda	DNS	
	3	Carl Oliver	Bahamas	DNS	

=== Final ===
Rank	Name	Nationality	Time	Notes
1st place, gold medalist(s)	Norberto Téllez	Cuba	45.38	
2nd place, silver medalist(s)	Omar Meña	Cuba	45.64	
3rd place, bronze medalist(s)	Eswort Coombs	Saint Vincent and the Grenadines	45.68	
4	Ian Morris	Trinidad and Tobago	45.75	
5	Chris Jones	United States	45.82	
6	Wendell Gaskin	United States	45.86	
7	Wenceslao Ferrín	Colombia	46.16	
8	Michael McDonald	Jamaica	46.21	
