= Amegatcher =

Amegatcher is a surname. Notable people with the surname include:

- Nene Amegatcher (born 1953), Ghanaian lawyer, academic and judge
- Solomon Amegatcher (born 1970), Ghanaian sprinter
