= Raymundo Escalante =

Mexican sprinter

Personal information
- Full name: Raymundo Escalante Wong
- Nationality: Mexican
- Born: 12 January 1964 (age 62)
- Height: 1.79 m (5 ft 10 in)
- Weight: 77 kg (170 lb)

Sport
- Sport: Sprinting
- Event: 4 × 100 metres relay

Raymundo Escalante Wong (born 12 January 1964) is a Mexican sprinter. He competed in the men's 4 × 100 metres relay at the 1992 Summer Olympics.

== International competitions ==
Year	Competition	Venue	Position	Event	Notes
Representing Mexico
1988	Ibero-American Championships	Seville, Spain	14th (h)	400 m	47.46
1988	Ibero-American Championships	Seville, Spain	5th	4 × 400 m relay	3:08.59
1989	Universiade	Duisburg, West Germany	27th (qf)	200 m	21.59
1989	Universiade	Duisburg, West Germany	16th (sf)	400 m	47.92
1989	Universiade	Duisburg, West Germany	–	4 × 400 m relay	DQ
1990	Central American and Caribbean Games	Mexico City, Mexico	7th	400 m	47.31
1990	Central American and Caribbean Games	Mexico City, Mexico	–	4 × 100 m relay	DQ
1990	Central American and Caribbean Games	Mexico City, Mexico	4th	4 × 400 m relay	3:06.21
1991	Central American and Caribbean Championships	Xalapa, Mexico	2nd	4 × 400 m relay	3:07.74
1991	World Championships	Tokyo, Japan	16th (h)	4 × 400 m relay	3:09.56
1992	Ibero-American Championships	Seville, Spain	10th (h)	400 m	47.31
1992	Ibero-American Championships	Seville, Spain	3rd	4 × 400 m relay	3:05.87
1992	Olympic Games	Barcelona, Spain	9th (h)	4 × 100 m relay	39.77^{1}
1992	Olympic Games	Barcelona, Spain	15th (h)	4 × 400 m relay	3:05.75
1993	World Indoor Championships	Toronto, Canada	23rd (h)	400 m	49.09
1993	World Championships	Stuttgart, Germany	35th (h)	400 m	48.03
1993	World Championships	Stuttgart, Germany	15th (h)	4 × 400 m relay	3:08.37
1994	Ibero-American Championships	Mar del Plata, Argentina	6th	400 m	48.24
1994	Ibero-American Championships	Mar del Plata, Argentina	2nd	4 × 400 m relay	3:07.75
1995	Pan American Games	Mar del Plata, Argentina	12th (h)	400 m	47.60
1995	Pan American Games	Mar del Plata, Argentina	5th	4 × 400 m relay	3:08.04
1995	World Championships	Gothenburg, Sweden	48th (h)	400 m	48.29
1995	World Championships	Gothenburg, Sweden	18th (h)	4 × 400 m relay	3:07.22
1996	Ibero-American Championships	Medellín, Colombia	8th	400 m	47.64
1996	Ibero-American Championships	Medellín, Colombia	1st	4 × 100 m relay	39.60
1998	Ibero-American Championships	Lisbon, Portugal	1st	4 × 400 m relay	3:06.12
1998	Central American and Caribbean Games	Maracaibo, Venezuela	4th	4 × 400 m relay	3:04.80

^{1}Disqualified in the semifinals

== Personal bests ==
Outdoor

- 200 metres – 21.46 (León 1998)
- 400 metres – 45.81 (Mexico City 1992)

Outdoor

- 400 metres – 49.09 (Toronto 1993)
