= Athletics at the 1989 Summer Universiade – Men's 400 metres =

The men's 400 metres event at the 1989 Summer Universiade was held at the Wedaustadion in Duisburg with the final on 26, 27, and 28 August 1989.

== Medalists ==
Gold	Silver	Bronze
Roberto Hernández; Cuba	Sérgio Menezes; Brazil	Oliver Bridges; United States

== Results ==
=== Heats ===
Rank	Heat	Athlete	Nationality	Time	Notes
1	4	Roberto Hernández	Cuba	46.00	Q
2	4	Felix Sandy	Sierra Leone	46.18	Q
3	3	Sérgio Menezes	Brazil	46.33	Q
4	4	Aivar Ojastu	Soviet Union	46.36	q
5	3	Howard Burnett	Jamaica	46.41	Q
6	5	Hachim Ndiaye	Senegal	46.42	Q
7	1	Lázaro Martínez	Cuba	46.59	Q
8	1	Oliver Bridges	United States	46.69	Q
9	5	Devon Morris	Jamaica	46.72	Q
10	3	Antonio Sánchez	Spain	46.79	q
11	2	Alessandro Pinna	Italy	46.93	Q
12	2	Arkadiy Kornilov	Soviet Union	46.99	Q
13	4	Junior de Lain	Netherlands	47.02	q
14	5	Thomas Koech	Kenya	47.03	q
15	3	Koichi Konakatomi	Japan	47.05	q
16	1	Raymundo Escalante	Mexico	47.17	q
17	1	Anselm Schuster	West Germany	47.39	
18	2	Marcello Pantone	Italy	47.71	
19	1	Moisés Fernández	Spain	47.78	
19	5	Richard Hill	Great Britain	47.78	
21	1	Josue Morales	Mexico	47.80	
21	5	Lee Bridges	United States	47.80	
23	3	Dávid Somfai	Hungary	48.14	
24	1	Daniel Mwihuri	Kenya	48.26	
25	2	Nicos Adamou	Cyprus	48.47	
26	2	Ali Faudet	Chad	48.50	
27	4	Paul Dennis	Great Britain	48.56	
28	3	Seiichi Ibe	Japan	48.84	
29	4	Lin Kuang-liang	Chinese Taipei	48.89	
30	2	Bernard Austin	Ghana	49.85	
31	1	Mohamed Mehdi Hasan	Bangladesh	50.12	
32	3	Wu Cheng-ho	Chinese Taipei	50.77	
33	5	Camera Ntereke	Botswana	51.21	
34	2	Lee Ka Kit	Hong Kong	51.85	
35	4	Wong Hung	Hong Kong	53.36	
36	4	Ndoluvualu Mukoko	Zaire	1:04.01	
	5	Francis Kpaka	Sierra Leone	DQ	

=== Semifinals ===
Rank	Heat	Athlete	Nationality	Time	Notes
1	2	Roberto Hernández	Cuba	45.53	Q
2	1	Lázaro Martínez	Cuba	45.87	Q
3	1	Sérgio Menezes	Brazil	46.03	Q
4	2	Howard Burnett	Jamaica	46.03	Q
5	1	Felix Sandy	Sierra Leone	46.20	Q
6	2	Oliver Bridges	United States	46.31	Q
7	1	Devon Morris	Jamaica	46.38	q
8	2	Aivar Ojastu	Soviet Union	46.63	Q
9	2	Hachim Ndiaye	Senegal	46.68	
10	1	Antonio Sánchez	Spain	46.83	
11	1	Thomas Koech	Kenya	47.02	
12	1	Koichi Konakatomi	Japan	47.08	
13	2	Junior de Lain	Netherlands	47.27	
14	1	Arkadiy Kornilov	Soviet Union	47.32	
15	2	Alessandro Pinna	Italy	47.60	
16	2	Raymundo Escalante	Mexico	47.92	

=== Final ===
Rank	Athlete	Nationality	Time	Notes
1st place, gold medalist(s)	Roberto Hernández	Cuba	45.42	
2nd place, silver medalist(s)	Sérgio Menezes	Brazil	45.66	
3rd place, bronze medalist(s)	Oliver Bridges	United States	45.78	
4	Lázaro Martínez	Cuba	45.92	
5	Devon Morris	Jamaica	46.30	
6	Aivar Ojastu	Soviet Union	46.66	
7	Howard Burnett	Jamaica	46.89	
	Felix Sandy	Sierra Leone	DNF	
