= Kevin Lyles =

American sprinter (born 1973)

Personal information
- Born: July 23, 1973 (age 53) Irvington, New Jersey, United States

Sport
- Sport: Track and field
Medal record
Representing United States
World Championships
Gold medal – first place	1995 Gothenburg	4x400m relay
Summer Universiade
Gold medal – first place	1993 Buffalo	4x400m relay

Kevin Lyles (born July 23, 1973) is an American former sprinter. He won gold medals with the United States in the 4 × 400-meter relay at the 1993 Summer Universiade and at the 1995 World Championships in Athletics, where he was an alternate runner in the heats stage.

In college, he ran for Seton Hall University where he was the 1993 Big East Indoor Championship's Most Outstanding Track Performer. At national level, he placed sixth in the 400 m at the 1995 USA Outdoor Track and Field Championships. He achieved his personal record of 45.01 seconds that year, which ranked him 15th in the world that season. He ceased competing at top level after the 1997 season.

From Irvington, New Jersey, he married Seton Hall track athlete Keisha Bishop. Their children are 100 m and 200 m World Champion Noah Lyles and 2014 World Junior Champion Josephus Lyles.

== International competitions ==
Year	Competition	Venue	Position	Event	Notes
1993	Universiade	Amherst, United States	1st	4 × 400 m relay	3:02.34
1995	Pan American Games	Mar del Plata, Argentina	–	4 × 400 m relay	DNF
1995	World Championships	Gothenburg, Sweden	1st	4 × 400 m relay	2:58.23 (heats)

== See also ==
- List of World Championships in Athletics medalists (men)
