= Kunle Adejuyigbe =

Nigerian sprinter

Personal information
- Born: 8 August 1977 (age 49)

Sport
- Sport: Track and field
Medal record
Representing Nigeria
World Championships
| Bronze medal – third place | 1995 Gothenburg | 4×400 m relay |
African Games
| Gold medal – first place | 1995 Harare | 4x400 m relay |

Adekunle "Kunle" Adejuyigbe (born 8 August 1977), also spelled Adekunle Adejiuyi, is a Nigerian sprinter.

Adejuyigbe was an All-American sprinter for the Idaho Vandals track and field team, finishing sixth in the 4 × 400 m at the 1999 NCAA Division I Indoor Track and Field Championships.

Adejuyigbe won a bronze medal in the 4 × 400 metres relay at the 1995 World Championships, together with teammates Udeme Ekpeyong, Jude Monye and Sunday Bada.
