= Athiaporn Koonjarthong =

Thai sprinter

Personal information
- Nationality: Thai
- Born: 12 October 1968 (age 57)

Sport
- Sport: Sprinting
- Event: 4 × 400 metres relay

Athiaporn Koonjarthong (born 12 October 1968) is a Thai sprinter. He competed in the men's 4 × 400 metres relay at the 1992 Summer Olympics.
