= Juan Jesús Gutiérrez (athlete) =

Mexican sprinter

Personal information
- Full name: Juan Jesús Gutiérrez Vallín
- Born: 7 September 1969 (age 56) Mazatlán, Sinaloa, Mexico
- Height: 1.85 m (6 ft 1 in)
- Weight: 72 kg (159 lb)

Sport
- Sport: Athletics
- Event: 400 metres hurdles

Juan Jesús Gutiérrez Vallín (born 7 September 1969) is a Mexican athlete specialising in the 400 metres hurdles. He competed in the men's 4 × 400 metres relay at the 1992 Summer Olympics.
