= João Francisco Capindica =

Angolan sprinter

Personal information
- Nationality: Angolan
- Born: 12 January 1971 (age 55)

Sport
- Sport: Sprinting
- Event: 400 metres

João Francisco Capindica (born 12 January 1971) is an Angolan former sprinter. He competed in the men's 400 metres at the 1992 Summer Olympics.
