= Omar Mena =

Cuban sprinter (born 1966)

Personal information
- Born: August 13, 1966 (age 59) Havana, Cuba

Sport
- Sport: Track and field
Medal record
Representing Cuba
Pan American Games
Gold medal – first place	1995 Mar del Plata	4x400m relay
Silver medal – second place	1995 Mar del Plata	400m
Central American and Caribbean Games
Gold medal – first place	1993 Ponce	4x400m relay
Gold medal – first place	1998 Maracaibo	4x400m relay
Bronze medal – third place	1993 Ponce	400m

Omar Mena Abreu (born August 13, 1966) is a retired male sprinter from Cuba. He claimed a total number of two medals at the 1995 Pan American Games in Mar del Plata, Argentina. Meña set his personal best in the men's 400 metres (46.19) on June 10, 1999, in Havana, Cuba.

== Achievements ==
Year	Competition	Venue	Position	Event	Notes
Representing Cuba
1993	Central American and Caribbean Games	Ponce, Puerto Rico	3rd	400 m	46.32
1993	Central American and Caribbean Games	Ponce, Puerto Rico	1st	4 × 400 m relay	3:05.62
1995	Pan American Games	Mar del Plata, Argentina	2nd	400 m	45.64
1995	Pan American Games	Mar del Plata, Argentina	1st	4 × 400 m relay	3:01.53
1997	Central American and Caribbean Championships	San Juan, Puerto Rico	2nd	4 × 400 m relay	3:04.50
1998	Central American and Caribbean Games	Maracaibo, Venezuela	1st	4 × 400 m relay	3:03.18
