= Stanislav Georgiev =

Bulgarian sprinter

Stanislav Georgiev (Bulgarian: Станислав Георгиев; born 6 February 1971) is a Bulgarian sprinter who specialized in the 200 metres.

He finished eighth in the 4 x 400 metres relay at the 1993 World Championships, with teammates Tsvetoslav Stankulov, Kiril Raykov, and Anton Ivanov.

His personal best time is 20.67 seconds, achieved in June 1993 in Sofia. This ranks him fourth among Bulgarian 200 metres sprinters, only behind Nikolay Antonov, Petko Yankov, and Yordan Ilinov.

He is married to sprinter Daniela Georgieva (née Spasova).
