= Jim Redmond =

Trinidadian-British engineer

- Born: 1940/1941; Trinidad and Tobago
- Died: 2 October 2022 (aged 81); Northampton, England
- Occupation: Engineer
- Children: Derek Redmond

Jim Redmond (c.1940/1941 – 2 October 2022) was a Trinidadian-British engineer. He gained international attention after helping his injured son Derek, who tore his hamstring, to cross the finish line during the men's 400 metres event at the 1992 Summer Olympics.

== Life and career ==
Redmond was born in Trinidad and Tobago. He was an engineer and a machine-shop owner.

At the 1992 Summer Olympics, Redmond gained international attention after helping his injured son Derek who pulled his hamstring to cross the finish line during the men's 400 metres event. It became one of the most memorable moments in Olympics history.

In 2012, Redmond was selected as a torchbearer at the 2012 Summer Olympics.

Redmond died on 2 October 2022 in Northampton, at the age of 81.
