= Dmitry Kosov =

Russian sprinter (born 1968)

Dmitriy Kosov
Personal information
- Born: 28 September 1968 (age 58) Vladivostok, Soviet Union
- Height: 1.87 m (6 ft 2 in)
- Weight: 80 kg (176 lb)

Sport
- Sport: Track and field
- Event: 400 metres
- Club: Dynamo Vladivostok
Medal record
Men's athletics
Representing Russia
European Championships
Bronze medal – third place	1994 Helsinki	4×400 m relay
Summer Universiade
Silver medal – second place	1995 Fukuoka	4x400 m relay
Bronze medal – third place	1995 Fukuoka	400 m

Dmitriy Alekseyevich Kosov (Russian: Дмитрий Алексеевич Косов; born 28 September 1968 in Vladivostok) is a retired Russian sprinter who specialised in the 400 metres. He competed at the 1992 and 1996 Summer Olympics. In addition, he won two medals at the 1995 Summer Universiade.

His personal bests in the event are 45.53 seconds outdoors (Moscow 1995) and 46.60 seconds indoors (Moscow 1993).

== Competition record ==
Year	Competition	Venue	Position	Event	Notes
Representing the Unified Team
1992	Olympic Games	Barcelona, Spain	45th (h)	400 m	47.28
1992	Olympic Games	Barcelona, Spain	14th (h)	4x400 m relay	3:05.59
1992	World Cup	Havana, Cuba	8th	4x400 m relay	3:10.38
Representing Russia
1993	World Indoor Championships	Toronto, Canada	18th (h)	400 m	47.86
1993	World Championships	Stuttgart, Germany	5th	4x400 m relay	3:00.44
1994	European Championships	Helsinki, Finland	8th	400 m	46.69
1994	European Championships	Helsinki, Finland	3rd	4x400 m relay	3:03.10
1995	Universiade	Fukuoka, Japan	3rd	400 m	45.70
1995	Universiade	Fukuoka, Japan	2nd	4x400 m relay	3:01.95
1996	Olympic Games	Atlanta, United States	14th (h)	4x400 m relay	3:05.63
1997	World Indoor Championships	Paris, France	4th	4x400 m relay	3:09.75
1998	Goodwill Games	Uniondale, United States	4th	4x400 m relay	3:06.53
