= Foday Sillah (sprinter) =

Sierra Leonean sprinter

Personal information
- Born: 12 March 1974 (age 52)

Sport
- Sport: Sprinting
- Event: 400 metres

Foday Sillah (born 12 March 1974) is a Sierra Leonean sprinter. He competed in the men's 400 metres at the 1992 Summer Olympics and the 1996 Olympic 4 × 400 m, as well as several other world championships and international competitions.

== Career ==
Sillah competed at both the 1990 World Junior Championships in Athletics and the 1992 edition. Though he didn't make it out of the 200 m or 400 m heats in 1990, he did advance to the semifinals of the World U20 400 m in 1992, finishing 5th in his semifinal and 15th overall. This made him the highest-placing male Sierra Leonean athlete ever at the World U20 Championships in nine appearances.

After failing to advance past the 1992 Olympic 400 m heats, Sillah began competing for the Sierra Leonean national relay teams, starting at the 1993 World Championships in Stuttgart where Sillah's 4 × 100 m team failed to advance. Three years later, Sillah returned to Olympic competition at the 1996 Olympic 4 × 400 m, helping his team place 27th overall but again not advancing to the semifinals.

Sillah competed at several IAAF circuit international meetings throughout his career. At the site of the 1993 Meeting Hauts-de-France Pas-de-Calais, he ran a Sierra Leonean indoor record in the 200 metres with a time of 21.43 seconds.
