= Henry Mohoanyane =

Personal information
- Nationality: Lesotho
- Born: 11 August 1963 (age 62)

Sport
- Sport: Sprinting
- Event: 400 metres

Henry Mohoanyane (born 11 August 1963) is a Lesotho sprinter. He competed in the men's 400 metres at the 1992 Summer Olympics.
