= Edsel Chase =

Barbadian sprinter (born 1968)

Personal information
- Nationality: Barbadian
- Born: 10 December 1968 (age 57)

Sport
- Sport: Sprinting
- Event: 4 × 400 metres relay

Edsel Chase (born 10 December 1968) is a Barbadian sprinter. He competed in the men's 4 × 400 metres relay at the 1992 Summer Olympics.
