= Athletics at the 1993 Summer Universiade – Men's 4 × 400 metres relay =

The men's 4 × 400 metres relay event at the 1993 Summer Universiade was held at the UB Stadium in Buffalo, United States on 18 July 1993.

== Results ==
Rank	Nation	Athletes	Time	Notes
1st place, gold medalist(s)	United States	Chris Jones, Aaron Payne, Kevin Lyles, Scott Turner	3:02.34	
2nd place, silver medalist(s)	Japan	Shigekazu Omori, Seiji Inagaki, Yoshihiko Saito, Masayoshi Kan	3:03.21	
3rd place, bronze medalist(s)	Hungary	David Somfai, Dusán Kovács, László Kiss, Miklos Arpasi	3:04.27	
4	Australia	Joshua Coull, Paul Greene, Rohan Robinson, Anthony Ryan	3:06.24	
5	Canada	Peter Ogilvie, Dwayne Amphlett, O'Brian Gibbons, Byron Goodwin	3:06.83	
6	Jamaica	Wayne Watson, Danny McFarlane, Evon Clarke, Orrett Wallace	3:07.45	
7	Italy	Mauro Maurizi, Alessandro Aimar, Paolo Bellino, Alessandro Pinna	3:07.82	
8	New Zealand	Martin Johns, Nick Cowan, Johnathon Schmidt, Darren Dale	3:10.39	
