= José Mendes (athlete) =

Portuguese sprinter

Personal information
- Nationality: Portuguese
- Born: 13 April 1972 (age 54)

Sport
- Sport: Sprinting
- Event: 4 × 400 metres relay

José Mendes (born 13 April 1972) is a Portuguese sprinter. He competed in the men's 4 × 400 metres relay at the 1992 Summer Olympics.
