= Delon Felix =

Grenadian sprinter

Personal information
- Nationality: Grenadian
- Born: 20 June 1974 (age 52)

Sport
- Sport: Sprinting
- Event: 400 metres

Delon Felix (born 20 June 1974) is a Grenadian sprinter. He competed in the men's 400 metres at the 1992 Summer Olympics.

== Achievements ==
Year	Competition	Venue	Position	Event	Notes
Representing Grenada
1992	World Junior Championships in Athletics	Seoul, South Korea	4th sf	400 m	47.41
1992	Summer Olympics	Barcelona, Spain	5th (h)	400 m	47.38
