= David Grindley =

British sprinter (born 1972)

Personal information
- Nationality: British (English)
- Born: 29 October 1972 (age 53) Hindley, England
- Height: 188 cm (6 ft 2 in)
- Weight: 79 kg (174 lb)

Sport
- Sport: Athletics
- Event: 400m
- Club: Wigan Harriers
Medal record
Men's Athletics
Representing Great Britain
Olympic Games
Bronze medal – third place	1992 Barcelona	4×400 m relay
World Junior Championships
Silver medal – second place	1990 Plovdiv	4×400 m relay
Summer Universiade
Bronze medal – third place	1995 Fukuoka	4x400 m relay

David Allan Grindley (born 29 October 1972) is a British former 400 metres track and field athlete who reached the final of the men's individual 400 metres and won bronze in the men's 4 x 400 metres relay in the 1992 Barcelona Olympics.

== Early life ==
He attended Park High School, which closed in the 1990s. He lived on Greenfields Crescent. He later attended Winstanley College.

== Career ==
Grindley finished third behind Alvin Daniel and Derek Redmond in the 400 metres event at the 1992 AAA Championships. Shortly afterwards at the 1992 Olympic Games in Barcelona, he represented Great Britain in the 400 metres (where he placed sixth) and the 4x400 metres relay events.

His personal best for the 400 metres is 44.47 seconds and is the fastest time by a British teenager.

Grindley had a spell playing Rugby Union with Aspull R.U.F.C and now works as an airline pilot and races (Road bicycle racing) for North Cheshire Clarion.
