= Tsvetoslav Stankulov =

Bulgarian sprinter

Tsvetoslav Stankulov (Bulgarian: Цветослав Станкулов) (born 1 February 1969) is a retired Bulgarian sprinter who specialized in the 400 metres.

He finished eighth in the 4 x 400 metres relay at the 1993 World Championships, with teammates Stanislav Georgiev, Kiril Raykov and Anton Ivanov. He also competed at the 1991 World Championships, without reaching the final.
