= Yuthana Thonglek =

Thai sprinter (born 1967)

Personal information
- Nationality: Thai
- Born: 13 January 1967 (age 59)

Sport
- Sport: Sprinting
- Event: 4 × 400 metres relay
Medal record
Men's athletics
Representing Thailand
Asian Championships
Silver medal – second place	1991 Kuala Lumpur	4×400 m

Yuthana Thonglek (born 13 January 1967) is a Thai sprinter. He competed in the men's 4 × 400 metres relay at the 1992 Summer Olympics.
