= Judy McDonald =

American comedian

Judy McDonald is an American comedian. She studied at the University of San Diego. She worked through college at KFMB AM/FM/TV studios. She has also worked for the Republican National Convention, the Commission on Presidential Debates and the Academy Awards.

She has appeared on the Dennis Miller show and opened for Paula Poundstone, Mark Curry, Caroline Rhea, Mitch Hedberg and Margaret Cho. She has performed at the Hollywood Comedy Store and is a regular at the best of San Diego at the La Jolla Comedy Store.

McDonald started performing standup her freshman year at the University of San Diego in 1994. She is a Catholic Comedian. A majority of her shows are for parishes, conferences, universities and diocesan events. McDonald is also a resin artist.
