= Solomon Amegatcher =

Ghanaian sprinter (born 1970)

Solomon Amegatcher (born 20 December 1970) is a retired Ghanaian sprinter who specialized in the 400 metres.

He reached the semi-final at the 1993 World Championships, and also competed at the 1992 and 1996 Olympic Games.

His personal best times were 45.42 seconds in the 400 metres and 21.15 seconds in the 200 metres, both achieved in 1993. Amegatcher co-held the Ghanaian record in the 4 x 400 metres relay of 3:05.2 which lasted from 1992 to 2015.

In college, Amegatcher was a 3-time NCAA All-American for the Alabama Crimson Tide in the 400-metres and 4 x 400 metres relay, and participated in setting the indoor school record in the 4X400 metre relay of 3:08.03 at the University of Alabama in 1993 which lasted until 2006.

He's an alumnus of St. John's School, Sekondi.
