= Fred Kudu =

Estonian track and field athlete, coach, and sport pedagogue

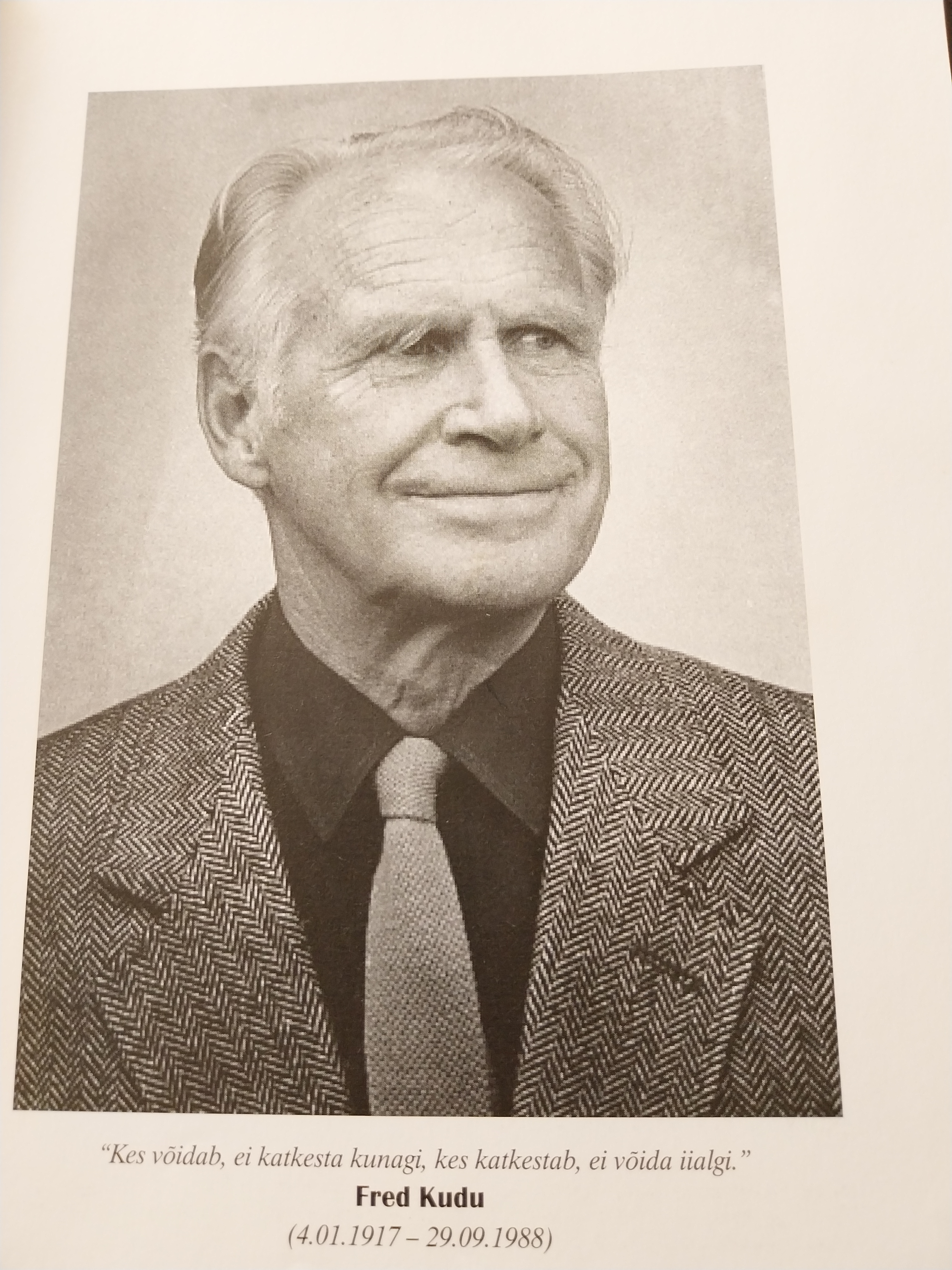
Fred Kudu

Fred Kudu (4 January 1917 Pärnu – 29 September 1988 Tartu) was an Estonian track and field athlete, coach and sport pedagogue.

In 1940 he graduated from the University of Tartu.

In 1939 he was Estonian champion in long jump.

1941-1943 he participated in WW II, fighting in Red Army.

He was one of the founder of the University of Tartu's Faculty of Physical Education (Estonian: Tartu Ülikooli kehakultuuriteaduskond). He was also one of the key persons to establish sport facilities, including Tartu University stadium, Kääriku Sports Centre. He was the Dean of the Faculty of Physical Education of the University of Tartu during various tenures: from 1944 until 1950, from 1952 until 1957, and form 1960 until 1965. He was Head of the Athletics Department from 1944 until 1950 and again, from 1951 until 1973. He was the head coach of the Soviet Union's multisport race team and coach of the Olympic team at five Olympic Games.

Notable students: Mykola Avilov, Heino Lipp, Rein Aun, Valter Külvet.

Awards:

- 1964: Soviet Union merited coach
- 1964: Estonian SSR merited sport personnel (Estonian: sporditegelane)
