= 1995 World Championships in Athletics =

Athletics competition in Gothenburg, Sweden

5th World Championships in Athletics
- Host city: Gothenburg, Sweden
- Nations: 191
- Athletes: 1804
- Dates: 5–13 August 1995
- Opened by: King Carl XVI Gustaf
- Main venue: Ullevi Stadium

The 5th World Championships in Athletics (Swedish: Världsmästerskapen i friidrott 1995), under the auspices of the International Association of Athletics Federations, were held at the Ullevi Stadium, Gothenburg, Sweden on 5–13 August 1995.

This edition featured 1804 athletes from 191 nations.

This competition saw the women run the 5000 m event at the World Championships for the first time. The race replaced the 3000 m event which had been run at all previous World Championships.

== Men's results ==
=== Track ===
1991 | 1993 | 1995 | 1997 | 1999

Event	Gold		Silver		Bronze	
100 m	Donovan Bailey; Canada	9.97	Bruny Surin; Canada	10.03	Ato Boldon; Trinidad and Tobago	10.03
200 m	Michael Johnson; United States	19.79; CR	Frankie Fredericks; Namibia	20.12	Jeff Williams; United States	20.18
400 m	Michael Johnson; United States	43.39; CR	Butch Reynolds; United States	44.22	Greg Haughton; Jamaica	44.56
800 m	Wilson Kipketer; Denmark	1:45.08	Arthémon Hatungimana; Burundi	1:45.64	Vebjørn Rodal; Norway	1:45.68
1500 m	Noureddine Morceli; Algeria	3:33.73	Hicham El Guerrouj; Morocco	3:35.28	Vénuste Niyongabo; Burundi	3:35.56
5000 m	Ismael Kirui; Kenya	13:16.77	Khalid Bouhlami; Morocco	13:17.15	Shem Kororia; Kenya	13:17.59
10,000 m	Haile Gebrselassie; Ethiopia	27:12.95; CR	Khalid Skah; Morocco	27:14.53	Paul Tergat; Kenya	27:14.70
Marathon	Martín Fiz; Spain	2:11:41	Dionicio Cerón; Mexico	2:12:13	Luíz Antônio dos Santos; Brazil	2:12:49
110 m hurdles	Allen Johnson; United States	13.00	Tony Jarrett; Great Britain	13.04	Roger Kingdom; United States	13.19
400 m hurdles	Derrick Adkins; United States	47.98	Samuel Matete; Zambia	48.03	Stéphane Diagana; France	48.14
3000 m st.	Moses Kiptanui; Kenya	8:04.16; CR	Christopher Koskei; Kenya	8:09.30	Saad Al-Asmari; Saudi Arabia	8:12.95; AR
20 km walk	Michele Didoni; Italy	1:19:59	Valentí Massana; Spain	1:20:23	Yevgeniy Misyulya; Belarus	1:20:48
50 km walk	Valentin Kononen; Finland	3:43:42	Giovanni Perricelli; Italy	3:45:11	Robert Korzeniowski; Poland	3:45:57
4 × 100 m relay	Canada (CAN); Donovan Bailey; Robert Esmie; Glenroy Gilbert; Bruny Surin	38.31	Australia (AUS); Paul Henderson; Tim Jackson; Steve Brimacombe; Damien Marsh	38.50	Italy (ITA); Giovanni Puggioni; Ezio Madonia; Angelo Cipolloni; Sandro Floris	39.07
4 × 400 m relay	United States (USA); Marlon Ramsey; Derek Mills; Butch Reynolds; Michael Johnson; Kevin Lyles*; Darnell Hall*	2:57.32	Jamaica (JAM); Michael McDonald; Davian Clarke; Danny McFarlane; Greg Haughton; Dennis Blake*	2:59.88	Nigeria (NGR); Udeme Ekpeyong; Kunle Adejuyigbe; Jude Monye; Sunday Bada	3:03.18
WR world record | AR area record | CR championship record | GR games record | NR national record | OR Olympic record | PB personal best | SB season best | WL world leading (in a given season)

Note: * Indicates athletes who ran in preliminary rounds.

=== Field ===
1991 | 1993 | 1995 | 1997 | 1999

Event	Gold		Silver		Bronze	
Long jump	Iván Pedroso; Cuba	8.70	James Beckford; Jamaica	8.30	Mike Powell; United States	8.29
Triple jump	Jonathan Edwards; Great Britain	18.29 (WR)	Brian Wellman; Bermuda	17.62	Jérôme Romain; Dominica	17.59
High jump	Troy Kemp; Bahamas	2.37	Javier Sotomayor; Cuba	2.37	Artur Partyka; Poland	2.35
Pole vault	Sergey Bubka; Ukraine	5.92	Maksim Tarasov; Russia	5.86	Jean Galfione; France	5.86
Shot put	John Godina; United States	21.47	Mika Halvari; Finland	20.93	Randy Barnes; United States	20.41
Discus throw	Lars Riedel; Germany	68.76 (CR)	Vladimir Dubrovshchik; Belarus	65.98	Vasiliy Kaptyukh; Belarus	65.88
Hammer throw	Andrey Abduvaliyev; Tajikistan	81.56	Igor Astapkovich; Belarus	81.10	Tibor Gécsek; Hungary	80.98
Javelin throw	Jan Železný; Czech Republic	89.58	Steve Backley; Great Britain	86.30	Boris Henry; Germany	86.08
Decathlon	Dan O'Brien; United States	8695	Eduard Hämäläinen; Belarus	8489	Mike Smith; Canada	8419
WR world record | AR area record | CR championship record | GR games record | NR national record | OR Olympic record | PB personal best | SB season best | WL world leading (in a given season)

== Women's results ==
=== Track ===
1991 | 1993 | 1995 | 1997 | 1999

Event	Gold		Silver		Bronze	
100 m	Gwen Torrence (USA)	10.85	Merlene Ottey (JAM)	10.94	Irina Privalova (RUS)	10.96
200 m	Merlene Ottey (JAM)	22.12	Irina Privalova (RUS)	22.12	Galina Malchugina (RUS)	22.37
400 m	Marie-José Pérec (FRA)	49.28	Pauline Davis (BAH)	49.96	Jearl Miles (USA)	50.00
800 m	Ana Fidelia Quirot (CUB)	1:56.11	Letitia Vriesde (SUR)	1:56.68 (AR)	Kelly Holmes (GBR)	1:56.95
1500 m	Hassiba Boulmerka (ALG)	4:02.42	Kelly Holmes (GBR)	4:03.04	Carla Sacramento (POR)	4:03.79
5000 m	Sonia O'Sullivan (IRL)	14:46.47 (CR)	Fernanda Ribeiro (POR)	14:48.54	Zahra Ouaziz (MAR)	14:53.77
10,000 m	Fernanda Ribeiro (POR)	31:04.99	Derartu Tulu (ETH)	31:08.10	Tegla Loroupe (KEN)	31:17.66
Marathon	Manuela Machado (POR)	2:25:39	Anuța Cătună (ROU)	2:26:25	Ornella Ferrara (ITA)	2:30:11
Marathon	The marathon course was 400 m short of the normal distance.					
100 m hurdles	Gail Devers (USA)	12.68	Olga Shishigina (KAZ)	12.80	Yuliya Graudyn (RUS)	12.85
400 m hurdles	Kim Batten (USA)	52.61 (WR)	Tonja Buford (USA)	52.62	Deon Hemmings (JAM)	53.48 (NR)
10 km walk	Irina Stankina (RUS)	42:13 (CR)	Elisabetta Perrone (ITA)	42:16	Yelena Nikolayeva (RUS)	42:20
4 × 100 m relay	United States (USA); Celena Mondie-Milner; Carlette Guidry; Chryste Gaines; Gwen Torrence; D'Andre Hill*	42.12	Jamaica (JAM); Dahlia Duhaney; Juliet Cuthbert; Beverly McDonald; Merlene Ottey; Michelle Freeman*	42.25	Germany (GER); Melanie Paschke; Silke Lichtenhagen; Silke-Beate Knoll; Gabriele Becker	43.01
4 × 400 m relay	United States (USA); Kim Graham; Rochelle Stevens; Camara Jones; Jearl Miles; Nicole Green*	3:22.29	Russia (RUS); Tatyana Chebykina; Svetlana Goncharenko; Yuliya Sotnikova; Yelena Andreyeva; Tatyana Zakharova*	3:23.98	Australia (AUS); Lee Naylor; Renée Poetschka; Melinda Gainsford-Taylor; Cathy Freeman	3:25.88
WR world record | AR area record | CR championship record | GR games record | NR national record | OR Olympic record | PB personal best | SB season best | WL world leading (in a given season)

Note: * Indicates athletes who ran in preliminary rounds.

=== Field ===
1991 | 1993 | 1995 | 1997 | 1999

Event	Gold		Silver		Bronze	
Long jump	Fiona May (ITA)	6.98	Niurka Montalvo (CUB)	6.86	Irina Mushayilova (RUS)	6.83
Triple jump	Inessa Kravets (UKR)	15.50 (WR)	Iva Prandzheva (BUL)	15.18	Anna Biryukova (RUS)	15.08
High jump	Stefka Kostadinova (BUL)	2.01	Alina Astafei (GER)	1.99	Inha Babakova (UKR)	1.99
Shot put	Astrid Kumbernuss (GER)	21.22	Huang Zhihong (CHN)	20.04	Svetla Mitkova (BUL)	19.56
Discus throw	Ellina Zvereva (BLR)	68.64	Ilke Wyludda (GER)	67.20	Olga Chernyavskaya (RUS)	66.86
Javelin throw	Natalya Shikolenko (BLR)	67.56	Felicia Tilea (ROU)	65.22	Mikaela Ingberg (FIN)	65.16
Heptathlon	Ghada Shouaa (SYR)	6651	Svetlana Moskalets (RUS)	6575	Rita Ináncsi (HUN)	6522
WR world record | AR area record | CR championship record | GR games record | NR national record | OR Olympic record | PB personal best | SB season best | WL world leading (in a given season)

== Medal table ==
Note that the host, Sweden, did not win any medals at these championships. This fate Sweden shares only with Canada (2001).

Rank	Nation	Gold	Silver	Bronze	Total
1	United States (USA)	12	2	5	19
2	Belarus (BLR)	2	3	2	7
3	Germany (GER)	2	2	2	6
3	Italy (ITA)	2	2	2	6
5	Cuba (CUB)	2	2	0	4
6	Kenya (KEN)	2	1	3	6
7	Canada (CAN)	2	1	1	4
7	Portugal (POR)	2	1	1	4
9	Ukraine (UKR)	2	0	1	3
10	Algeria (ALG)	2	0	0	2
11	Russia (RUS)	1	4	7	12
12	Jamaica (JAM)	1	4	2	7
13	Great Britain (GBR)	1	3	1	5
14	Bulgaria (BUL)	1	1	1	3
14	Finland (FIN)	1	1	1	3
16	Bahamas (BAH)	1	1	0	2
16	Ethiopia (ETH)	1	1	0	2
16	Spain (ESP)	1	1	0	2
19	France (FRA)	1	0	2	3
20	Czech Republic (CZE)	1	0	0	1
20	Denmark (DEN)	1	0	0	1
20	Ireland (IRL)	1	0	0	1
20	Syria (SYR)	1	0	0	1
20	Tajikistan (TJK)	1	0	0	1
25	Morocco (MAR)	0	3	1	4
26	Romania (ROU)	0	2	0	2
27	Australia (AUS)	0	1	1	2
27	Burundi (BDI)	0	1	1	2
29	Bermuda (BER)	0	1	0	1
29	China (CHN)	0	1	0	1
29	Kazakhstan (KAZ)	0	1	0	1
29	Mexico (MEX)	0	1	0	1
29	Namibia (NAM)	0	1	0	1
29	Suriname (SUR)	0	1	0	1
29	Zambia (ZAM)	0	1	0	1
36	Hungary (HUN)	0	0	2	2
36	Poland (POL)	0	0	2	2
38	Brazil (BRA)	0	0	1	1
38	Dominica (DMA)	0	0	1	1
38	Nigeria (NGR)	0	0	1	1
38	Norway (NOR)	0	0	1	1
38	Saudi Arabia (KSA)	0	0	1	1
38	Trinidad and Tobago (TTO)	0	0	1	1
Totals (43 entries)		44	44	44	132
