= Marlon Ramsey =

American sprinter

Marlon Ramsey (born September 11, 1974, in Galveston, Texas) is an American former sprinter.

Competing for the Baylor Bears track and field team, Ramsey won the 1996 NCAA Division I Outdoor Track and Field Championships in the 4 × 400 m relay.
