= Wendell Gaskin =

American sprinter

Personal information
- Born: January 7, 1973 (age 53)
Medal record
Men's athletics
Pan American Games
| Silver medal – second place | 1995 Mar del Plata | 4×100 m relay |

Wendell Gaskin (born January 7, 1973) is a retired American sprinter who specialized in the 400 metres.

He finished sixth in the 400 metres at the 1995 Pan American Games, and also won a silver medal in the 4 × 100 metres relay at the same games.

His personal best time was 45.29 seconds, achieved in June 1994 in Knoxville. He also had 10.21 seconds in the 100 metres, achieved in May 1993 in Odessa; and 20.71 seconds in the 200 metres, achieved in May 1996 in Westwood.
