= Roger Jordan =

Barbadian sprinter (born 1972)

Personal information
- Nationality: Barbadian
- Born: 26 May 1972 (age 54)

Sport
- Sport: Sprinting
- Event: 4 × 400 metres relay

Roger Andrew Thomas Jordan (born 26 May 1972) is a Barbadian sprinter. He competed in the men's 4 × 400 metres relay at the 1992 Summer Olympics.
