= Stevon Roberts =

Barbadian sprinter (born 1971)

Personal information
- Nationality: Barbadian
- Born: 15 January 1971 (age 55)

Sport
- Sport: Sprinting
- Event: 800 metres

Stevon Roberts (born 15 January 1971) is a Barbadian sprinter. He competed in the men's 4 × 400 metres relay at the 1992 Summer Olympics.

Roberts competed for the Murray State Racers track and field team, where he was an All-American sprinter.
