= Takahiro Watanabe =

Japanese sprinter

Personal information
- Nationality: Japanese
- Born: 8 April 1970 (age 55)

Sport
- Sport: Sprinting
- Event: 400 metres

Takahiro Watanabe (渡辺 高博, Watanabe Takahiro; born 8 April 1970) is a Japanese sprinter. He competed in the men's 400 metres at the 1992 Summer Olympics.
