= Eulogio Sandoval =

Bolivian footballer (born 1922)

Personal information
- Date of birth: 14 July 1922
- Place of birth: Bolivia
- Position: Midfielder

Senior career*
Years	Team	Apps	(Gls)
- Club Litoral

International career
- Bolivia
- * Club domestic league appearances and goals

Eulogio Sandoval (born 14 July 1922, date of death unknown) was a Bolivian football midfielder who played for Bolivia in the 1950 FIFA World Cup. He also played for Club Litoral. Sandoval is deceased.
