= Eulogio Ngache =

Equatoguinean sprinter

Personal information
- Nationality: Equatoguinean
- Born: 8 October 1971 (age 54)

Sport
- Sport: Sprinting
- Event: 400 metres

Eulogio Ngache Luembe (born 8 October 1971) is an Equatoguinean sprinter. He competed in the men's 400 metres at the 1992 Summer Olympics.

== Career ==
At a 15 September 1991 meeting in Malabo, Ngache ran 23.05 seconds for 200 m and 56.94 over 400 m. The marks placed him 2nd and 3rd in Equatorial Guinea on the year respectively.

Ngache was seeded in the 5th 400 metres heat at the 1992 Olympics. He ran 50.83 seconds to place 8th in his heat and did not advance. His time was a personal best.

His race against Baptiste Firiam was used as an example of how smaller nations had adjusted expectations at the Olympics.

On 13 May 2000, Ngache ran 11.58 seconds over 100 metres at a meeting in Aluche, Madrid.

== Personal life ==
Ngache represented the Asociación Atlética Móstoles club in Móstoles, Community of Madrid. He was also a technical official for athletics meetings.
