= Kiril Raykov =

Bulgarian sprinter

Kiril Raykov (Bulgarian: Кирил Райков, born 15 May 1969) is a retired Bulgarian sprinter who specialized in the 400 metres.

He finished eighth in the 4 x 400 metres relay at the 1993 World Championships, with teammates Stanislav Georgiev, Tsvetoslav Stankulov and Anton Ivanov. He also competed at the 1988 World Junior Championships without reaching the final.
