= Cephas Lemba =

Zambian sprinter

Personal information
- Nationality: Zambian
- Born: 21 May 1970 (age 56)

Sport
- Sport: Sprinting
- Event: 400 metres

Cephas Lemba (born 21 May 1970) is a Zambian sprinter. He competed in the men's 400 metres at the 1992 Summer Olympics.
