= Udeme Ekpeyong =

Nigerian sprinter

Personal information
- Born: 28 March 1973 (age 53)

Sport
- Sport: Track and field
Medal record
Representing Nigeria
World Championships
Bronze medal – third place	1995 Gothenburg	4x400 m
African Championships
Silver medal – second place	1993 Durban	4×400 m
Summer Universiade
Silver medal – second place	1995 Fukuoka	400 m

Udeme Sam Ekpeyong (born 28 March 1973) is a retired Nigerian sprinter who specialized in the 400 metres.

Ekpeyong was an All-American sprinter for the USC Trojans track and field team, finishing 8th in the 400 m at the 1995 NCAA Division I Outdoor Track and Field Championships.

Ekpeyong won a bronze medal in 4 x 400 metres relay at the 1995 World Championships, together with teammates Kunle Adejuyigbe, Jude Monye and Sunday Bada. At the 1992 Summer Olympics he finished fifth with teammates Emmanuel Okoli, Hassan Bosso and Sunday Bada.

He had to leave from the 1994 Commonwealth Games after the Canada Border Services Agency found steroids in his suitcase.
