= Innokenty Zharov =

Russian sprinter

Personal information
- Nationality: Russian
- Born: 23 November 1968 (age 57) Leningrad, Soviet Union

Sport
- Sport: Sprinting
- Event: 4 × 400 metres relay
Medal record
Representing Russia
Summer Universiade
Silver medal – second place	1995 Fukuoka	4x400m relay

Innokenty Zharov (born 23 November 1968) is a Russian sprinter. He competed in the men's 4 × 400 metres relay at the 1996 Summer Olympics.
