= Mark Anthony Graham =

Canadian soldier and athlete (1973–2006)

Mark Anthony Graham (May 17, 1973, in Gordon Town, Jamaica – September 4, 2006, in Panjwaii, Kandahar, Afghanistan) was a Canadian Olympic athlete and soldier who died while participating in Operation Medusa during the NATO mission in Afghanistan.

== Biography ==
Graham was born on May 17, 1973, in Gordon Town, Jamaica and grew up in Hamilton, Ontario, lived in Calgary, Alberta and had been stationed at CFB Petawawa in Ontario. He attended Chedoke Middle School and then Sir Allan MacNab Secondary School in Hamilton, then the University of Nebraska–Lincoln and later Kent State in Ohio on track-and-field scholarships.

Graham competed at the 1992 Summer Olympics in Barcelona as a member of the 4x400m relay. They finished fifth in their heat with a time of 3:04.69 and did not advance to the finals. He also represented Canada at the 1994 Commonwealth Games in Victoria, British Columbia.

In 2004, Graham enlisted in the Canadian Armed Forces and served as a Private in the 1st Battalion of The Royal Canadian Regiment. He was regarded as an excellent role model for younger soldiers with a strong record within his unit.

On September 4, 2006, Graham was killed in a friendly fire incident when two USAF A-10 Thunderbolts fired on his platoon, having mistaken them for Taliban insurgents. He was awarded the Sacrifice Medal and is buried at the National Military Cemetery in Ottawa.

== See also ==
- Canadian records in track and field
