= Jude Monye =

Nigerian sprinter

Medal record

Representing Nigeria

Men's athletics

Olympic Games
Gold medal – first place	2000 Sydney	4 × 400 m relay

World Championships
Bronze medal – third place	1995 Gothenburg	4 × 400 m relay

All-Africa Games
Gold medal – first place	1999 Johannesburg	4 × 400 m relay
Bronze medal – third place	1995 Harare	400 m

Jude Monye (born 16 November 1973) is a Nigerian athlete who specializes in the 400 metres. He is of Onicha-Ugbo, Delta State of Nigeria origin. Monye came to the United States to attend Mississippi State University, where he obtained a degree in geology. While attending school, he won the diversity visa lottery and was allowed to become a legal permanent resident of the United States. He became a citizen on 20 February 2004.

His personal best is 45.16, set during the 1995 World Championships in Athletics where he reached the semi-final. The same year he won a bronze medal at the All-Africa Games. Monye was a part of the Nigerian team that won the silver medal in the 4 × 400 metres relay at the 2000 Olympics. He also competed in the individual contest, but was knocked out in the heats.

== Olympics Controversy ==
During the 2000 Olympics, the American team won the gold medal, with the Nigerian team finishing second. However, Antonio Pettigrew acknowledged that he had used performance-enhancing drugs, along with two other members of the relay team, and was therefore stripped of his medal. The awards were not immediately reallocated to the runners-up Nigeria that Monye raced on, despite the likelihood of it.

On 21 July 2012, the 2000 Olympics 4 × 400 m relay medals were reallocated after the USA team was stripped of the gold medal, meaning Monye and Nigeria are the gold medalists.

== Personal Bests ==
Event	Time (s) (Wind)	Date	Venue	Note
Outdoor
200 m	20.78 (-0.1)	15 April 1995	(United States) Starkville, Mississippi	
300 m	34.04	25 June 2004	(Germany) Heidelberg	
400 m	44.83	11 May 1996	(Jamaica) Kingston	
400 m Hurdles	50.90	22 March 1997	(Nigeria) Benin City	
4 × 400 m Relay	2:58.68	30 September 2000	(Australia) Sydney	NR
Indoor
200 m	22.00	17 January 1997	(Canada) Montréal	
400 m	46.70	2 February 1997	(Germany) Stuttgart	
4 × 400 m Relay	3:09.76	10 March 2001	(Portugal) Lisbon	

== External ==
- Jude Monye at World Athletics
