= Derek Redmond =

British retired sprinter (born 1965)

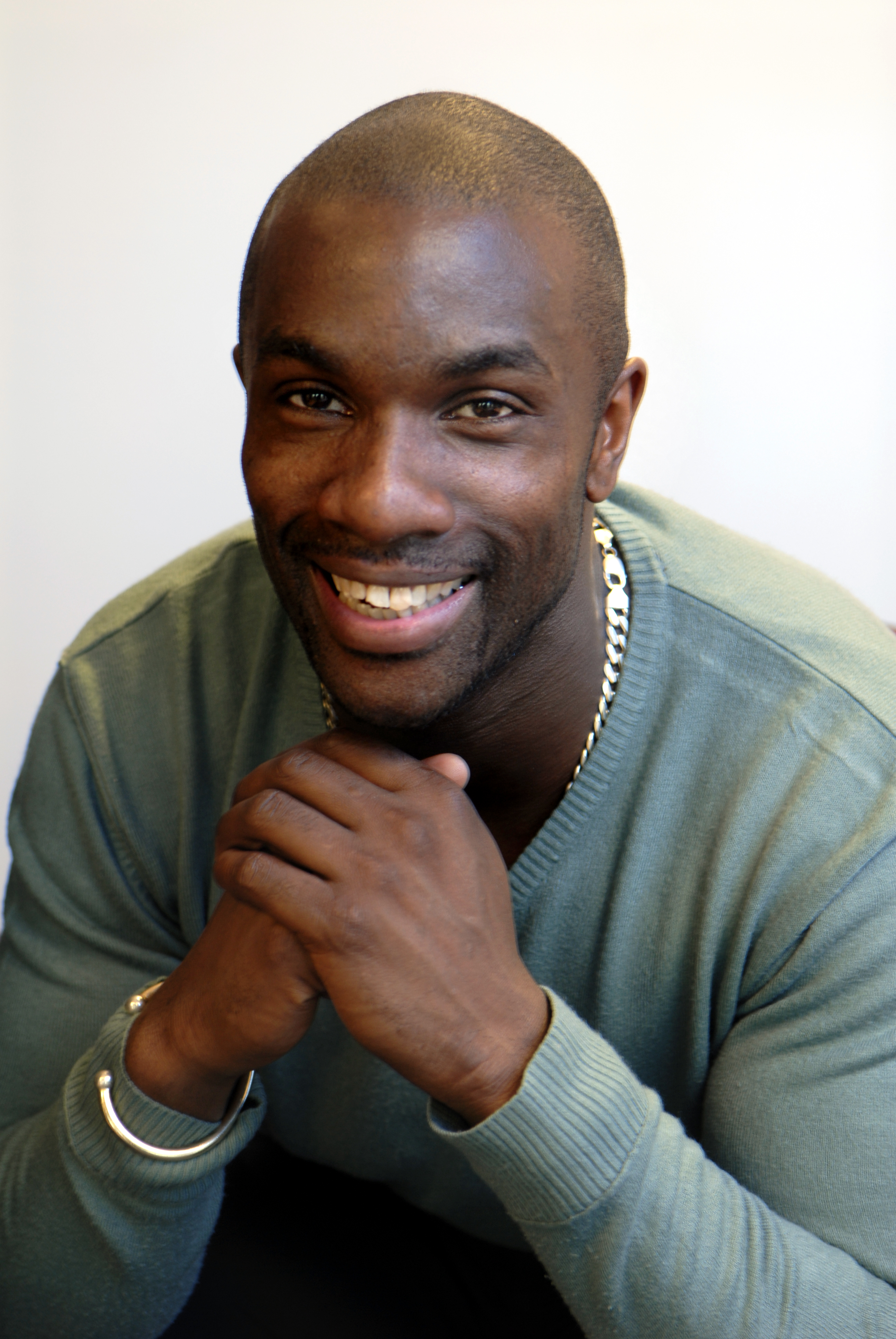
- Redmond in 2007

Personal information
- Nationality: British (English)
- Born: 3 September 1965 (age 60) Bletchley, Buckinghamshire, England
- Height: 183 cm (6 ft 0 in)
- Weight: 70 kg (154 lb)
- Parent: Jim Redmond (father)

Sport
- Sport: Athletics
- Event: 400m
- Club: Birchfield Harriers
Medal record
Men's athletics
Representing Great Britain
World Championships
Gold medal – first place	1991 Tokyo	4 × 400 m relay
Silver medal – second place	1987 Rome	4 × 400 m relay
European Championships
Gold medal – first place	1986 Stuttgart	4 × 400 m relay

Derek Anthony Redmond (born 4 September 1965) is a British retired sprinter. During his career, he held the British record for the 400 metres sprint, and won gold medals in the 4 × 400 metres relay at the World Championships and European Championships.

At the 1992 Olympic Games in Barcelona, Redmond tore his hamstring in the 400 metres semi-final but continued the race limping and, with assistance from his father, managed to complete a full lap of the track as the crowd gave him a standing ovation. Although Redmond was disqualified and listed as "Did Not Finish" due to the outside assistance finishing the race, the incident has become a well-remembered moment in Olympic history, having been the subject of one of the International Olympic Committee's "Celebrate Humanity" videos and been used in advertisements by Visa as an illustration of the Olympic spirit and featured in Nike's "Courage" commercials in 2008.

== Personal life ==
Redmond was born in Bletchley in Buckinghamshire to West Indian immigrant parents and educated at Roade School, Northamptonshire, where a multi-use sports hall is named after him. He is a supporter of Newcastle United.

Following the 1992 Barcelona olympics Redmond was in a relationship with Olympic Swimmer Sharron Davies, and they resided in the East Hunsbury area of Northampton. They later married in 1994 in Northampton. The couple had two children. They divorced in 2000.

In 2006 Redmond met Maria Yates and on 26 August 2011 Redmond married Maria and adopted her two children, Lucia Redmond and Paola Redmond.

== Athletics career ==
Redmond was a four-times British 400 metres champion after winning the British AAA Championships title at the 1991 AAA Championships and finishing as the highest placed British athlete at the 1985, 1987 and 1992 AAA Championships.

Redmond first broke the British record for the 400 metres in 1985 with a run of 44.82 seconds. This record was subsequently broken by Roger Black, but Redmond reclaimed the record in 1987 when he clocked 44.50 seconds at the World Athletics Championships in Rome.

In 1986, Redmond was a member of the team that won the 4 × 400 metres relay gold medal at the European Championships. The following year, he was on the team that won the 4 × 400 metres relay silver medal at the World Championships.

At the 1991 World Championships Redmond was a member of the British team that shocked the athletics world by beating the much-favoured American team into second place to claim the gold medal in the 4 × 400 metres relay. Redmond ran the second leg in the final and, together with teammates Roger Black, John Regis and Kriss Akabusi, ran what was then the second-fastest 4 × 400 metres relay in history.

Injuries consistently interrupted Redmond's career. At the 1988 Olympics in Seoul, he pulled out of the opening round of the 400 metres 90 seconds before his heat because of an injury to his Achilles tendon. Before the 1992 Summer Olympics, he had undergone eight operations due to injuries.

=== 1992 Summer Olympics ===
Redmond was in good form by the time of the Barcelona Olympics. He posted the fastest time of the first round, and went on to win his quarter-final. In the semi-final, Redmond started well, but in the back straight about 250 metres from the finish, his hamstring tore. He hobbled to a halt, and then fell to the ground in pain. Stretcher bearers made their way over to him, but Redmond decided he wanted to finish the race. He began to hobble along the track. He was soon joined on the track by his father, Jim Redmond, who barged past security and on to the track to get to his son. Jim and Derek completed the lap of the track together, with Derek leaning on his father's shoulder for support. As they crossed the finish line, the crowd of 65,000 spectators rose to give Derek a standing ovation. However, as his father had helped him finish, Derek was officially disqualified and Olympic records state that he "Did Not Finish" the race.

Redmond's struggle in the 1992 semi-final later became the subject of one of the International Olympic Committee's "Celebrate Humanity" videos, which proclaimed: "Strength is measured in pounds. Speed is measured in seconds. Courage? You can't measure courage". In 2008, Redmond was featured in the "Go World" series of Visa advertisements promoting the Olympic Games. The advertisement highlights his 1992 injury, noting that "he and his father finished dead last, but he and his father finished", narrated by actor Morgan Freeman.

On 10 January 2012, it was announced that his father Jim would be one of the Olympic torch bearers in London for the Summer Games. Jim Redmond died in October 2022, aged 81.

== Retirement from athletics ==
Two years after the Olympics in Barcelona, he was told by a surgeon that he would never run again or represent his country in sport. However, after coming to terms with the loss of athletics as a career, he began to turn his attention, with the encouragement of his father, to other sports that he enjoyed. He went on to play professional basketball for Birmingham Bullets and the England national team.

Redmond formerly served as Director of Development for sprints and hurdles for UK Athletics.

In 1994, Redmond won Celebrity Gladiators, and during the third series of Gladiators (1994), he served as "Official Timekeeper" to referee John Anderson. Redmond has also served as a commentator for Eurosport, and presented a basketball show on ITV.

In 2015, Redmond joined psychometric assessment provider Thomas International as their Group Performance Director.
