= Anton Ivanov (sprinter) =

Bulgarian sprinter (born 1971)

Anton Sashov Ivanov (Bulgarian: Антон Сашов Иванов; born 18 July 1971) is a retired Bulgarian sprinter who specialized in the 400 metres.

He finished eighth in the 4 x 400 metres relay at the 1993 World Championships, with teammates Stanislav Georgiev, Tsvetoslav Stankulov, and Kiril Raykov. He also finished fifth at the 1994 European Championships and sixth at the 1996 European Indoor Championships. In addition to that, he competed in the men's 200 metres at the 1996 Summer Olympics.

His personal best time is 45.61 seconds, achieved in July 1993 in Sofia. This ranks him second among Bulgarian 200 metres sprinters, only behind Iliya Dzhivondov.
