= Francis Ogola =

Ugandan sprinter

Francis Ogola (born 1 July 1973 in Lira) is a retired Ugandan sprinter who specialized in the 400 metres.

Running for the George Mason Patriots track and field team, Ogola ran the 400 m leg to win the 1997 distance medley relay at the NCAA Division I Indoor Track and Field Championships.

His personal bests were 21.03 seconds over 200 metres (from 1995) and 45.47 s over 400 metres (from 1993).

== Achievements ==
Year	Competition	Venue	Position	Event	Notes
Representing Uganda
1991	All-Africa Games	Cairo, Egypt	3rd	400m	46.21
1992	World Junior Championships	Seoul, South Korea	3rd	400m	46.16
