= Rico Lieder =

German sprinter

Medal record

Men's athletics

Representing East Germany

European Championships
Bronze medal – third place	1990 Split	4×400 m

Rico Lieder (born 25 September 1971 in Burgstädt, East Germany) is a retired German sprinter who specialized in the 400 metres.

He competed for the clubs SC Karl-Marx-Stadt, LG Chemnitz and LAC Chemnitz during his active career.

== Achievements ==
Year	Competition	Venue	Position	Event	Notes
Representing East Germany
1990	World Junior Championships	Plovdiv, Bulgaria	2nd	400m	46.28
1990	World Junior Championships	Plovdiv, Bulgaria	6th	4 × 400 m relay	3:07.39
1990	European Championships	Split, Yugoslavia	3rd	4 × 400 m relay	3:01.51
Representing Germany
1991	World Indoor Championships	Seville, Spain	1st	4 × 400 m relay	3:03.05 WRi
1991	World Championships	Tokyo, Japan	6th	4 × 400 m relay	3:00.75
1993	World Indoor Championships	Toronto, Canada	4th	400 m	46.53
1993	World Championships	Stuttgart, Germany	3rd	4 × 400 m relay	2:59.99
