= Anthony Wallace (sprinter) =

Jamaican sprinter

Personal information
- Full name: Anthony Wayne Wallace
- Nationality: Jamaican
- Born: 7 August 1968 (age 57)

Sport
- Sport: Sprinting
- Event: 400 metres

Anthony Wayne Wallace (born 7 August 1968) is a Jamaican sprinter. He competed in the men's 400 metres at the 1992 Summer Olympics.

Wallace competed for the George Mason Patriots track and field team in the NCAA.
