= Emmanuel Okoli =

Nigerian sprinter

- Born: 13 November 1973
- Occupation: Track and field

Emmanuel Okoli (born 13 November 1973) is a retired Nigerian sprinter who specialized in the 400 metres. Okoli finished fifth in 4 x 400 metres relay at the 1992 Summer Olympics with teammates Hassan Bosso, Sunday Bada and Udeme Ekpeyong.
