= Aivar Ojastu =

Estonian athletics competitor

Personal information
- Born: 21 September 1961 (age 64) Tartu, Soviet Union

Sport
- Sport: Track and field

Aivar Ojastu (born 21 September 1961) is an Estonian athletics competitor.

He was born in Tartu. In 1999 he graduated from the University of Tartu's Institute of Physical Education.

He began athletics training in 1969, coached by his mother, track and field athlete Linda Ojastu. Later his coach was Fred Kudu. His older sister is Paralympic track and field athlete Annely Ojastu. He won several medals at Soviet Union athletics championships. He is 24-time Estonian champion in different running disciplines. 1973–1993 he was a member of Estonian national athletics team, and 1990 a member of Soviet Union national athletics team.
