= Diarra =

Diarra is a French translation of the clan name Jara used in West Africa, as a hangover from the French colonial empire in that region. It originates from the Bambara language word jara, meaning lion, synonymous with waraba. The Kingdom of Diarra existed from the 7th century until the 19th century. The name is also frequently used with reference to the 18th- to early 19th-century Bambara Empire in Ségou, Mali, which was ruled successively by Ngolo Diarra, his son Mansong (or Monzon) Diarra, and then his son Da Diarra.

The clan name (or patronym) Jara/Diarra is related to another clan name, Koné, and is heard in many of the chronicles that have been handed down orally. Both are frequently praised together in song, signifying bravery and fearlessness.

The name Diarra, now a surname, is traditionally found mostly in Mali, but also Burkina Faso, Côte d'Ivoire, Guinea and Senegal. Today, it has also spread around the world, notably in France and Spain. Today, it is also used as a given name.

Diarra may refer to:

== Surname ==
- Abdel Diarra (full name Abdel Rahamane Diarra Khalil; born 1994), Ivorian footballer
- Abdoulaye Diarra (footballer, born 1986), Ivorian footballer
- Abdoulaye Diarra (footballer, born 1994), Malian international footballer who plays for Maghreb de Fès
- Aboubacar Diarra (born 1993), Malian footballer, played in Egypt
- Adama Traoré Diarra (born 1996), known as Adama, Spanish footballer, plays for Fulham, brother of Mohamed Traoré Diarra
- Ali Diarra (born 1988), Ivorian footballer
- Alou Diarra (born 1981), French international footballer, 2006 FIFA World Cup runner-up
- Alpha Mandé Diarra (born 1954), Malian author
- Amadou Baba Diarra (1933–2008), Malian general and politician
- Arouna Diarra, member of the American folk musical group Rising Appalachia
- Boubacar Diarra (disambiguation), several people, including:
  - Boubacar Diarra (footballer, born 1979), retired Malian footballer
  - Boubacar Diarra (footballer, born 1994), current footballer who plays for Neroca F.C.
- Boubakary Diarra (born 1993), French-born footballer who has represented Mali at youth level
- Brahima Diarra (born 2003), French footballer, plays for Huddersfield Town
- Cartier Diarra (born 1998), American basketball player
- Cheick Diarra (disambiguation), several people
- Cheikh-Alan Diarra (born 1993), French professional footballer
- Diadié Diarra (born 1991), French footballer
- Djelika Diarra (born 2007), French long jumper
- Djigui Diarra (born 1995), Malian footballer who plays for Tanzanian club Young Africans
- Dramane Diarra (born 1980), French basketball player
- Drissa Diarra (disambiguation), several people
- Elea-Mariama Diarra (born 1990), French athlete
- Fatim Diarra (born 1986), Finnish politician
- Fatoumata Diarra (disambiguation), several people
- Habib Diarra (born 2004), Senegalese footballer, plays for Strasbourg, France
- Harouna Diarra (born 1978), Malian former footballer, played in Crete
- Hélène Diarra (1955–2021), Malian actress
- Ibrahima Diarra (born 1971), Burkinabè former professional footballer
- Ichaka Diarra (born 1995), Malian footballer, plays for Lebanese club Ansar
- Ismaïla Diarra (born 1992), Malian footballer
- Jack Diarra (born 2006), Burkinabe footballer
- Jean-Gabriel Diarra (1945–2019), Malian Roman Catholic bishop
- Lamine Diarra (born 1983), Senegalese football player
- Laré Mohamed Diarra, Burkina Faso international footballer
- Lassana Diarra (born 1985), French international footballer
- Lassana Diarra (Malian footballer) (born 1989), Malian footballer, plays for Djoliba AC
- Lassina Diarra, Malian footballer, plays for AS Bakaridjan
- Mahamadou Diarra (born 1981), Malian international footballer
- Maimouna Diarra (born 1991), Senegalese basketball player
- Mamadou Diarra (disambiguation), several people
- Mamady Diarra (born 2000), Malian footballer
- Mansong Diarra (aka Monzon), ruler of the Bambara Empire from 1795 to 1808; son of Ngolo Diarra
- Mariatou Diarra (born 1985), Malian women's basketball player
- M'Bam Diatigui Diarra (1946–2011), Malian lawyer and human rights activist
- Mohamadou Diarra (born 1983), Senegalese rugby union player
- Mohamed Traoré Diarra, Spanish footballer known as Moha Traoré, brother of Adama
- Mohamed Diarra (born 2001), French basketball player
- Mohammed Diarra (born 1992), Guinean international footballer
- Moké Diarra (born 1983), Malian former professional footballer
- Moussa Diarra (disambiguation), several people
- Moustapha Diarra (born 1987), French basketball player
- Nakunte Diarra (c. 1941–2020), Malian textile artist
- Ngolo Diarra, king of the Bambara Empire from 1766 to 1795; father of Mansong Diarra
- Nianta Diarra (born 1993), Malian professional basketball player
- Oumou Armand Diarra, pseudonym of Malian writer Oumou Modibo Sangare
- Ousmane Diarra (disambiguation), several people
- Raphaël Diarra (born 1995), French professional footballer
- Salimata Diarra (born 1994), Malian international footballer, plays for the Mali women's national team
- Sekou Diarra (born 1993), Malian international footballer, plays for Onze Créateurs
- Seydina Diarra (born 1994), Belgian-Malian footballer
- Seydou Diarra (1933–2020), Prime Minister of Côte d'Ivoire
- Seydou Diarra (footballer) (born 1968), Ivorian former footballer
- Sidiki Diarra (1952–2014), former Burkinabé footballer, later manager of Burkina Faso national team
- Sigamary Diarra (born 1984), retired Malian footballer
- Souleymane Diarra (born 1995), Malian footballer
- Stéphane Diarra (born 1998), Ivorian footballer
- Tapha Diarra (Moustafa "Tapha" Diarra; born 1970), Senegalese sprinter
- Usman Diarra (born 1998), Indonesian footballer
- Yacouba Diarra (born 1988), Malian footballer
- Youba Diarra (born 1998), Malian footballer, plays for Red Bull Salzburg

== Given name ==
- Diarra Sylla (born 2001), French-Senegalese singer, dancer and model
- Diarra Kilpatrick, American actress
- Diarra Traoré (1935–1985), Guinean soldier and politician
- Liya Ag Ablil, aka Diarra, founding member of Mali Tuareg band Tinariwen
- Mame Diarra Bousso (1833–1866), Sufi saint from Senegal
