= List of Lesotho records in athletics =

The following are the national records in athletics in Lesotho maintained by Lesotho Amateur Athletics Association (LAAA).

== Outdoor ==
Key to tables: Awaiting ratification Record not kept by LAAA Not ratified or later rescinded by LAAA

=== Men ===
Event	Record	Athlete	Date	Meet	Place	Ref.
60 m	6.71 (−0.9 m/s) A	Mojela Koneshe	6 February 2024	ACNW Track & Field League 3	Potchefstroom, South Africa	
100 y	9.53+ (−0.5 m/s)	Mosito Lehata	26 May 2015	Golden Spike Ostrava	Ostrava, Czech Republic	
100 m	10.07 (+1.4 m/s)	Mojela Koneshe	27 July 2026	Commonwealth Games	Glasgow, United Kingdom	
200 m	20.36 (+0.5 m/s)	Mosito Lehata	31 July 2014	Commonwealth Games	Glasgow, United Kingdom	
400 m	45.46	Henry Mohoanyane	18 March 1988		Bloemfontein, South Africa	
800 m	1:50.85	Freddy Lenka	6 March 1982		Welkom, South Africa	
1500 m	3:47.36	Moeketsi Mosuhli	24 March 2006	Commonwealth Games	Melbourne, Australia	
3000 m	8:02.27	Thabang Baholo	16 October 1990		Port Elizabeth, South Africa	
5000 m	13:21.68	Namakoe Nkhasi	26 June 2016	African Championships	Durban, South Africa	
5 km (road)	13:58	Tebello Ramakongoana	13 April 2024	B.A.A. 5K	Boston, United States	
10,000 m	28:01.00	Kamohelo Mofolo	28 July 2026	Commonwealth Games	Glasgow, Scotland	
10 km (road)	27:47	Kamohelo Mofolo	13 July 2025	ABSA Run Your City Durban 10K	Durban, South Africa	
15 km (road)	43:09	Thabang Baholo	2 November 1991		Cape Town, South Africa	
20 km (road)	1:02:22	Simon Tsotang	14 October 2006		George, South Africa	
Half marathon	1:00:17	Tebello Ramakongoana	22 June 2024	Garry Bjorklund Half Marathon	Duluth, United States	
25 km (road)	1:11:59	Tebello Ramakongoana	21 December 2025	Tata Steel Kolkata 25K	Kolkata, India	
Marathon	2:06:18	Tebello Ramakongoana	5 January 2025	C&D Xiamen Marathon	Xiamen, China	
Marathon	2:04:18 a (Note: downhill point-to-point course)	Tebello Ramakongoana	20 April 2026	Boston Marathon	Boston, United States	
110 m hurdles	15.1	Edwin Mashai	1 May 1971		Lebanon	
400 m hurdles	54.70	Relebohile Mosito	4 March 2010	Yellow Pages Series III	Potchefstroom, South Africa	
3000 m steeplechase						
High jump	1.95 m	Potse Potse	5 April 1985		Mbabane, Swaziland	
Pole vault						
Long jump	6.53 m (+0.1 m/s)	Pule Rantseli	20 August 2011	Universiade	Shenzhen, China	
Triple jump	13.56 m	Leoma Rebonejoang	30 May 2010	Southern Africa Region Junior Championships	Maputo, Mozambique	
Shot put	11.82 m	Matete Matete	11 May 1987		Teyateyaneng, Lesotho	
Discus throw	34.50 m	Alfred Mokoyana	21 June 1997		Durban, South Africa	
Hammer throw						
Javelin throw	52.00 m	Mefi Tsietso	14 December 2002		Teyateyaneng, Lesotho	
Decathlon						
Decathlon	100m (wind) / Long jump (wind) / Shot put / High jump / 400m / 110m H (wind) / Discus / Pole vault / Javelin / 1500m					
20 km walk (road)						
50 km walk (road)						
4 × 100 m relay	42.11	Lesotho; M. Mosili; R. Molise; M. Mphou; S. Thuso	15 September 1999	All-Africa Games	Johannesburg, South Africa	
4 × 400 m relay	3:15.67	Lesotho; Isaac Seatile; Motlatsi Maseela; Makoekoe Mahanetsa; Mpho Morobe	2 August 1996	Olympic Games	Atlanta, United States	

=== Women ===
Event	Record	Athlete	Date	Meet	Place	Ref.
100 m	11.84 (+0.8 m/s) A	Mamakoli Senauoane	21 March 2026	Maseru International Meet	Maseru, Lesotho	
200 m	23.63 A (+0.7 m/s)	Mamakoli Senauoane	21 February 2026	AGN Track & Field League 3	Pretoria, South Africa	
400 m	52.31 A	Mamakoli Senauoane	12 April 2025	FNB Botswana Golden Grand Prix	Gaborone, Botswana	
800 m	2:05.04	Tsepang Sello	6 April 2019		Stellenbosch, South Africa	
1500 m	4:17.31	Tsepang Sello	23 February 2018	HTS Louis Botha and Cell C Invitational	Bloemfontein, South Africa	
3000 m	9:41.16	Matirinta Mota	5 May 2000		Bellville, South Africa	
5000 m	17:02.1	Nthabiseng Maktoi	2002		Maseru, Lesotho	
5 km (road)	15:38+	Neheng Khatala	2 April 2023	ABSA Gqeberha10k	Gqeberha, South Africa	
10,000 m	36:00.2	Mamokete Lechela	March 2000		Maseru, Lesotho	
10 km (road)	32:43	Neheng Khatala	2 April 2023	ABSA Gqeberha10k	Gqeberha, South Africa	
Half marathon	1:14:11	Mamorallo Tjoka	1 July 2007		Durban, South Africa	
Marathon	2:33:41	Neheng Khatala	23 September 2018		Cape Town, South Africa	
100 m hurdles	14.84 (Note: record set during heptathlon competition)	Selloane Tsoaeli	10-11 April 2010	Meeting International de Maurice	Réduit, Mauritius	
400 m hurdles						
3000 m steeplechase						
High jump	1.78 m	Selloane Tsoaeli	5 September 2010	Continental Cup	Split, Croatia	
High jump	1.78 m	Selloane Tsoaeli	8 October 2010	Commonwealth Games	New Delhi, India	
High jump	1.78 m	Selloane Tsoaeli	10 October 2010	Commonwealth Games	New Delhi, India	
Pole vault						
Long jump	5.90 m	Selloane Tsoaeli	19 June 2010		Havana, Cuba	
Triple jump	13.57 m (+0.6 m/s)	Lerato Sechele	10 April 2018	Commonwealth Games	Gold Coast, Australia	
Shot put	11.28 m	Selloane Tsoaeli	18 June 2010		Havana, Cuba	
Discus throw	26.50 m	Maki Thokoa	6 April 1990		Maseru, Lesotho	
Hammer throw						
Javelin throw	37.52 m	Selloane Ts'oaeli	14 April 2012	African Combined Events Championships	Bambous, Mauritius	
Heptathlon	5371 pts	Selloane Tsoaeli	10–11 April 2010	Meeting International de Maurice	Réduit, Mauritius	
Heptathlon	100m H (wind) / High jump / Shot put / 200m (wind) / Long jump (wind) / Javelin / 800m; 14.84 / 1.75 m / 10.95 m / 26.07 / 5.70 m / 34.87 m / 2:15.82					
20 km walk (road)						
4 × 100 m relay	48.9 h	Lesotho	24 July 1999		Harare, Zimbabwe	
4 × 400 m relay	4:14.9 h	Lesotho	6 April 1990		Maseru, Lesotho	

== Indoor ==
=== Men ===
Event	Record	Athlete	Date	Meet	Place	Ref.
60 m	7.00	Mosito Lehata	9 March 2012	World Championships	Istanbul, Turkey	
200 m						
400 m						
800 m						
1500 m						
3000 m	8:26.83	Tau Khotso	9 March 2001	World Championships	Lisbon, Portugal	
60 m hurdles						
High jump						
Pole vault						
Long jump						
Triple jump						
Shot put						
Heptathlon						
Heptathlon	60m / Long jump / Shot put / High jump / 60m H / Pole vault / 1000m					
5000 m walk						
4 × 400 m relay						

=== Women ===
Event	Record	Athlete	Date	Meet	Place	Ref.
60 m						
200 m						
400 m						
800 m						
1500 m						
3000 m						
60 m hurdles						
High jump						
Pole vault						
Long jump						
Triple jump	13.07 m	Lerato Sechele	27 January 2018	Indoor Zone Championship Meeting	Reims, France	
Shot put						
Pentathlon						
Pentathlon	60m H / High jump / Shot put / Long jump / 800m					
3000 m walk						
4 × 400 m relay						
