= Boubacar Diarra =

Boubacar Diarra is the name of two Malian footballers:

- Boubacar Diarra (footballer, born 1979), retired footballer who last played for Liaoning Whowin
- Boubacar Diarra (footballer, born 1994), current footballer who plays for Neroca F.C.

== See also ==
- Boubakary Diarra (born 1993), French-born footballer who has represented Mali at youth level
