= 2026 New York City Marathon =

26.2 mi (42.195 km) race in New York, U.S.

55th New York City Marathon
- Runners at mile 24 of the marathon in Central Park
- Location: New York City, New York, U.S.
- Dates: November 1, 2026 (5 days ago)
- Website: www.nyrr.org/tcsnycmarathon

Champions
- Men: Andreas Almgren (2:06:01)
- Women: Sheila Chepkirui (2:24:36)
- Wheelchair men: Marcel Hug (1:28:14)
- Wheelchair women: Catherine Debrunner (1:40:02)

The 2026 New York City Marathon was the 55th edition of the annual marathon race in New York City that took place on Sunday, November 1, 2026. The platinum-level race was the last of seven World Marathon Majors events of the 2026 calendar year.

Around 60,000 runners started the race. The marathon's main sponsor continues to be Tata Consultancy Services since 2014.

== Results ==
In his marathon debut, Andreas Almgren became the first Swede to win the race in any division, the 13th nationality to win the men's division, and 25th nationality added to all the division champions.

=== Men ===
Elite men's top 10 finishers
Position	Athlete	Nationality	Time
1st place, gold medalist(s)	Andreas Almgren	Sweden	2:06:01
2nd place, silver medalist(s)	Yemaneberhan Crippa	Italy	2:06:14
3rd place, bronze medalist(s)	Kamohelo Mofolo	Lesotho	2:06:26
4	Benson Kipruto	Kenya	2:06:27
5	Haftu Strintzos	Australia	2:06:34
6	Zouhair Talbi	United States	2:06:43
7	Ahmed Muhumed	United States	2:07:08
8	Geoffrey Kamworor	Kenya	2:07:09
9	Ryota Kondo	Japan	2:07:09
10	Ryan Ford	United States	2:07:17

=== Women ===
Elite women's top 10 finishers
Position	Athlete	Nationality	Time
1st place, gold medalist(s)	Sheila Chepkirui	Kenya	2:24:36
2nd place, silver medalist(s)	Jessica McClain	United States	2:24:42
3rd place, bronze medalist(s)	Hellen Obiri	Kenya	2:24:43
4	Edna Kiplagat	Kenya	2:25:42
5	Mercy Chelangat	Kenya	2:25:46
6	Carrie Ellwood	United States	2:26:28
7	Weini Kelati	United States	2:26:51
8	Paige Wood	United States	2:27:29
9	Viola Cheptoo	Kenya	2:28:34
10	Fabienne Königstein	Germany	2:28:49

=== Wheelchair Men ===
Wheelchair men's top 10 finishers
Position	Athlete	Nationality	Time
1st place, gold medalist(s)	Marcel Hug	Switzerland	1:28:14
2nd place, silver medalist(s)	Daniel Romanchuk	United States	1:28:15
3rd place, bronze medalist(s)	David Weir	United Kingdom	1:35:38
4	Lito Anker	Netherlands	1:35:39
5	Aaron Pike	United States	1:37:06
6	Ludwig Malter	Austria	1:38:53
7	Miguel Jimenez Vergara	United States	1:39:38
8	Evan Correll	United States	1:40:37
9	Johnboy Smith	United Kingdom	1:40:39
10	Patrick Monahan	Ireland	1:40:39

=== Wheelchair Women ===
Wheelchair women's top 10 finishers
Position	Athlete	Nationality	Time
1st place, gold medalist(s)	Catherine Debrunner	Switzerland	1:40:02
2nd place, silver medalist(s)	Tatyana McFadden	United States	1:48:28
3rd place, bronze medalist(s)	Susannah Scaroni	United States	1:48:32
4	Madison de Rozario	Australia	1:53:06
5	Eden Rainbow-Cooper	United Kingdom	1:55:51
6	Hoda Elshorbagy	Egypt	2:00:09
7	Vanessa de Souza	Brazil	1:59:38
8	Patricia Eachus	Switzerland	2:01:58
9	Hannah Dederick	United States	2:06:06
10	Emelia Perry	United States	2:09:01
