= Aboubakry Dia =

Senegalese sprinter

Personal information
- Born: 17 April 1967 (age 59)

Sport
- Sport: Track and field

Aboubakry Dia (born 17 April 1967) is a retired Senegalese sprinter who specialized in the 400 metres.

He is best known for finishing fourth in the 4 × 400 metres relay at the 1996 Olympic Games, together with Moustapha Diarra, Hachim Ndiaye and Ibou Faye. The team ran in a Senegalese record.

His personal best time was 46.50 seconds (1991).
