= Mamadou Diarra =

Mamadou Diarra may refer to:

- Mamadou Diarra (basketball) (born 1986), Malian basketball player
- Mamadou Diarra (footballer, born 1970), Malian football striker
- Mamadou Diarra (footballer, born 1997), Senegalese football defender
- Mamadou Diarra (footballer, born 1998)

== See also ==
- Mahamadou Diarra (born 1981), Malian international footballer
- Mohamadou Diarra (born 1983), Senegalese rugby union player
