= Roger Gill =

Roger Gill may refer to:

- Roger Gill (sprinter) (1972–2008), Guyanese Olympic sprinter
- Roger Gill (American football) (1940–1999), American football wide receiver
