= List of Senegalese records in athletics =

The following are the national records in athletics in Senegal maintained by its national athletics federation: Fédération Sénégalaise d'Athlétisme (FSA).

== Outdoor ==
Key to tables: Awaiting ratification Record not kept by FSA

=== Men ===
Event	Record	Athlete	Date	Meet	Place	Ref.
100 m	10.03 (+0.5 m/s)	Mamadou Fall Sarr	28 June 2025	Meeting National de Carquefou	Carquefou, France	
200 m	20.21 A (+0.6 m/s)	Oumar Loum	2 July 2000		Mexico City, Mexico	
300 m	33.09	Oumar Loum	16 September 2003		Nancy, France	
400 m	44.94	Cheikh Tidiane Diouf	7 August 2024	Olympic Games	Paris, France	
600 m	1:15.7 h	Assane Diallo	25 January 1999		Dakar, Senegal	
800 m	1:44.06	Moussa Fall	17 August 1988	Weltklasse Zürich	Zürich, Switzerland	
1000 m	2:18.06	Babacar Niang	18 August 1983		Grosseto, Italy	
1500 m	3:38.88	Mor Seck	15 July 2014		Trento, Italy	
3000 m	8:12.65	Cheik Ameth Tidiane Boye	16 June 1995		Sotteville, France	
5000 m	14:29.7	Moussa Bâ	4 April 1991		Dakar, Senegal	
10,000 m	30:15.17	Ibrahima Gning	22 June 2007		Dakar, Senegal	
10 km (road)	30:10	Kaouding Savane	11 January 2026	10K Valencia Ibercaja by Kiprun	Valencia, Spain	
Half marathon	1:06:48	Cheikh Ndiaye	13 March 2004		Dakar, Senegal	
Marathon	2:25:01	Samba Faye	14 February 2016		Dakar, Senegal	
110 m hurdles	13.59 (±0.0 m/s)	Louis François Mendy	18 June 2019	Meeting de Bonneuil-sur-Marne	Bonneuil-sur-Marne, France	
110 m hurdles	13.33 (−0.3 m/s)	Louis François Mendy	10 June 2023	Atletica Geneve	Geneva, Switzerland	
400 m hurdles	47.23	Amadou Dia Bâ	25 September 1988	Olympic Games	Seoul, South Korea	
3000 m steeplechase	8:58.13	Boubacar Sabaly	3 July 2016		Castellón, Spain	
High jump	2.26 m	Moussa Sagna Fall	9 July 1982		Paris, France	
Pole vault	5.21 m	Karim Sène	23 August 2003		Fribourg, Switzerland	
Long jump	8.46 m (+1.8 m/s)	Cheikh Tidiane Touré	15 June 1997		Bad Langensalza, Germany	
Triple jump	17.07 m A (+1.7 m/s)	Ndiss Kaba Badji	3 May 2008	African Championships	Addis Ababa, Ethiopia	
Shot put	16.44 m	Lamine Badji	28 August 1982		Kuwait City, Kuwait	
Discus throw|	56.72 m	Ibrahima Guèye	7 May 1978		Dakar, Senegal	
Hammer throw	52.40 m	Adama Camara	30 July 2006		Ngor, Senegal	
Javelin throw	79.30 m	Bouna Diop	6 July 1997		Fort-de-France, France	
Decathlon	7211 pts	Maba Ndiaye	12-13 August 2000		Val-de-Reuil, France	
Decathlon	100m (wind) / Long jump (wind) / Shot put / High jump / 400m / 110m H (wind) / Discus / Pole vault / Javelin / 1500m; 10.96 / 7.23 m / 12.12 m / 2.00 m / 50.11 / 14.22 / 38.25 m / 3.85 m / 46.26 m / 4:49.75					
20 km walk (road)						
50 km walk (road)						
4 × 100 m relay	39.36	Senegal; Oumar Loum; Seydou Loum; Amadou Mbagnick Mbaye; Charles-Louis Seck	15 July 1992		Nice, France	
4 × 400 m relay	3:00.64	Senegal; Tapha Diarra; Aboubakry Dia; Hachim Ndiaye; Ibou Faye	3 August 1996	Olympic Games	Atlanta, United States	

=== Women ===
Event	Record	Athlete	Date	Meet	Place	Ref.
100 m	11.24 (+1.5 m/s)	Aminata Diouf	15 August 1999		La Chaux-de-Fonds, Switzerland	
200 m	22.64 (+1.0 m/s)	Aïda Diop	2 July 2000		Mexico City, Mexico	
400 m	49.86	Amy Mbacké Thiam	7 August 2001	World Championships	Edmonton, Canada	
800 m	2:07.25	Raissa Laval	23 July 2014	Meeting National	La Roche-sur-Yon, France	
1000 m	2:53.27	Raissa Laval	13 September 2014		Poitiers, France	
1500 m	4:20.03	Raissa Laval	26 June 2016		Angers, France	
3000 m	10:07.31	Mame Daba Mbengue	18 June 2016		Jesolo, Italy	
5000 m	17:41.37	Raissa Djihounouck	18 June 2010		Dakar, Senegal	
10,000 m	30:15.17	Ibrahima Gning	22 June 2007		Dakar, Senegal	
10 km (road)	34:15	Raissa Laval	29 March 2014	Foulées du Grand Angoulême	Angoulême, France	
Half marathon	1:33:59	Therese Maheza Anaming	14 February 2016		Dakar, Senegal	
25 km (road)	2:22:21+	Fatima Assi	30 May 2015	Stockholm Marathon	Stockholm, Sweden	
30 km (road)	2:51:31+	Fatima Assi	30 May 2015	Stockholm Marathon	Stockholm, Sweden	
Marathon	3:42:59	Elise Kandji	14 February 2016		Dakar, Senegal	
100 m hurdles	12.94 (−1.4 m/s)	Mame Tacko Diouf	6 May 2000		Dakar, Senegal	
300 m hurdles	38.6 h	Mame Tacko Diouf	21 February 1999		Dakar, Senegal	
400 m hurdles	54.75	Mame Tacko Diouf	16 June 1999	Athens Grand Prix Tsiklitiria	Athens, Greece	
3000 m steeplechase	11:06.74	Ramata Thiam	20 July 2003		Reims, France	
High jump	1.83 m	Constance Senghor	27 May 1984		Dakar, Senegal	
Pole vault	3.71 m	Fatoumata Gnacko	26 June 2013		Aulnay-sous-Bois, France	
Long jump	6.64 m (+0.3 m/s)	Kène Ndoye	16 July 2004	African Championships	Brazzaville, Republic of the Congo	
Triple jump	15.08 m (+0.1 m/s)	Saly Sarr	23 August 2026	Kamila Skolimowska Memorial	Chorzów, Poland	
Shot put	13.10 m	Nafissatou Mboup	8 May 1998		Mâcon, France	
Discus throw	51.62 m	Ndoumbé Gaye	24 June 2000		Wiesbaden, Germany	
Hammer throw	69.70 m	Amy Sène	25 May 2014		Forbach, France	
Javelin throw	51.05 m	Florence Corréa	24 May 2010		Limburgerhof, Germany	
Heptathlon	5094 pts	Paulette Mendy	21–22 June 2003		Évian-les-Bains, France	
Heptathlon	100m H (wind) / High jump / Shot put / 200m (wind) / Long jump (wind) / Javelin / 800m; 14.74 / 1.60 m / 10.17 m / 25.03 / 5.78 m / 33.98 m / 2:27.73					
20 km walk (road)						
50 km walk (road)						
4 × 100 m relay	44.59	Senegal; Seynabou Ndiaye; Amy Mbacké Thiam; Mame Tacko Diouf; Aminata Diouf	20 August 1998	African Championships	Dakar, Senegal	
4 × 400 m relay	3:28.02	Senegal; Aïda Diop; Mame Tacko Diouf; Aminata Diouf; Amy Mbacké Thiam	29 September 2000	Olympic Games	Sydney, Australia	

=== Mixed ===
Event	Record	Athlete	Date	Meet	Place	Ref.
4 × 400 m relay	3:20.19	Senegal; Cheikh Tidiane Diouf	27 June 2021		Lagos, Nigeria	

== Indoor ==
=== Men ===
Event	Record	Athlete	Date	Meet	Place	Ref.
60 m	6.54	Mamadou Fall Sarr	31 January 2025	Elite Track Miramas Meeting	Miramas, France	
200 m	20.90	Oumar Loum	19 February 1995	Meeting Pas de Calais	Liévin, France	
200 m	20.90	Oumar Loum	18 February 2001	Meeting Pas de Calais	Liévin, France	
400 m	46.62	Cheikh Tidiane Diouf	4 February 2026	IFAM Louvain-La-Neuve	Louvain-La-Neuve, Belgium	
800 m	1:48.33	Babacar Niang	8 March 1987	World Championships	Indianapolis, United States	
1500 m	3:42.29	Mor Seck	22 January 2012	Meeting Nazionale	Ancona, Italy	
3000 m	8:00.40 (Note: outdoor mark ratified as absolute record)	Cheikh Tickane Boye	21 January 1996		Paris, France	
55 m hurdles	7.42	Dembele Moussa	4 March 2011	NJCAA Championships	Lubbock, United States	
60 m hurdles	7.75	Dembele Moussa	10 February 2013	CIAA Championships	Hampton, United States	
400 m hurdles	50.94	Mamadou Hasse	12 February 2013	International Meeting Val-de-Reuil	Val-de-Reuil, France	
High jump	2.23 m	Moussa Sagna Fall	26 February 1983		Paris, France	
Pole vault	5.14 m	Karim Séne	3 February 2007		Carrières-sous-Poissy, France	
Long jump	8.17 m	Cheikh Tidiane Touré	15 February 1998		Bordeaux, France	
Triple jump	16.10 m	Papa Ladji Konaté	1 February 1997		Eaubonne, France	
Triple jump	16.10 m	Ndiss Kaba Badji	20 February 2005	Russian Winter Meeting	Moscow, Russia	
Triple jump	16.79 m	Amath Faye	30 January 2026	Elite Meeting	Miramas, France	
Shot put	14.94 m	Songane Ngom	4 February 1995		Paris, France	
Heptathlon						
Heptathlon	60m / Long jump / Shot put / High jump / 60m H / Pole vault / 1000m					
5000 m walk						
4 × 400 m relay						

=== Women ===
Event	Record	Athlete	Date	Meet	Place	Ref.
60 m	7.37	N'Deye Binta Dia	4 February 1996	Meeting Pas de Calais	Liévin, France	
200 m	23.56	Amy Mbacké Thiam	10 February 2009	Meeting Pas de Calais	Liévin, France	
400 m	52.48	Amy Mbacké Thiam	2 February 2006	GE Galan	Stockholm, Sweden	
800 m	2:09.92	Raissa Laval	18 January 2014	Meeting National	Nantes, France	
1500 m	4:28.43	Raissa Laval	21 February 2015		Aubière, France	
3000 m						
60 m hurdles	8.15	Gnima Faye	7 March 2014	World Championships	Sopot, Poland	
High jump	1.84 m (Note: outdoor mark ratified as absolute record)	Awa Dioum-Ndiaye	8 March 1986		Paris, France	
Pole vault	3.44 m	Fatoumata Gnacko	20 January 2012		Villeurbanne, France	
Long jump	6.36 m	Kéné Ndoye	8 February 2004		Moscow, Russia	
Triple jump	14.72 m	Kéné Ndoye	15 March 2003	World Championships	Birmingham, United Kingdom	
Shot put	11.74 m	Aissatou Barry	4 January 2004		Bordeaux, France	
Shot put	12.18 m	Sokhna Mously Niang	29 January 2023	Regional Junior Championships	Parma, Italy	
Pentathlon	3795 pts	Kéné Ndoye	8 February 2004		Moscow, Russia	
Pentathlon	60m H / High jump / Shot put / Long jump / 800m; 8.50 / 1.55 m / 9.31 m / 6.36 m / 2:33.11					
3000 m walk						
4 × 400 m relay	3:49.52	Senegal; Mame Fatou Faye; Aïda Diop; Aminata Sylla; Ndèye Fatou Soumah	27 September 2005	Women's Islamic Games	Tehran, Iran	
