= Athletics at the 1996 Summer Olympics – Men's 4 × 400 metres relay =

These are the official results of the men's 4 × 400 metres relay event at the 1996 Summer Olympics in Atlanta, United States. There were 35 nations competing.

The United States ran the event without their top two qualifiers from the Olympic Trials. World record holder Butch Reynolds was injured before the games and 400 metres gold medalist Michael Johnson strained a muscle in his leg during the 200 metres final, despite winning with a world record of 19.32.

Seizing the opportunity of a weakened U.S. squad, Great Britain's Iwan Thomas shot out to a lead from the gun, putting a large gap on the U.S.'s LaMont Smith to his inside. Thomas began to tie up toward the end of his leg, allowing Smith to gain back to almost even with Thomas by the handoff, with Michael McDonald putting Jamaica into third position. Alvin Harrison ran a solid turn and looked to put the U.S. in the lead at the break, but Jamie Baulch sprinted past him on the outside to put Britain back in the lead. Harrison held his position behind Baulch all the way until the end of the second turn, with Greg Haughton bringing Jamaica into the three-team breakaway for the medals. Harrison steadily gained on the last half of the turn, pulling even by the straightaway, then cleanly separated, putting the U.S. in the lead. Haughton followed Harrison around Baulch running down lane 2 trying to catch Harrison. The U.S. and Great Britain both exchanged cleanly on the inside, but as Jamaica's Haughton handed off to Roxbert Martin, they crossed legs with Martin coming out doing a full somersault, losing a couple of steps on the U.S.'s Derek Mills, with Mark Richardson in hot pursuit. Richardson pulled in the gap to Mills, looking poised to take the lead coming off the final turn, but Mills held him off and pulled away down the straight. Mills handed off to Anthuan Maybank, whose selection to the U.S. team was controversial. Maybank was not selected for the individual race because he had been disqualified for a lane violation in the Olympic trials. Normally, the top six finishers would be selected and he technically did not finish. Now in the absence of Johnson and Reynolds, he was thrust into anchor role for the U.S. team. Britain's silver medalist Roger Black gained on Maybank but ultimately failed to pass him, giving the U.S. the gold medal with a margin of four metres. Davian Clarke brought bronze for Jamaica three seconds later. Behind the medalists, Senegal had a poor final handoff behind Japan, leaving them even with Poland on the final lap. Ibou Faye made up the deficit, passing Japan's Shigekazu Ōmori for fourth place.

== Medalists ==
| Gold | Silver | Bronze |
|---|---|---|
| United States; LaMont Smith; Alvin Harrison; Derek Mills; Anthuan Maybank; Jason Rouser* | Great Britain; Iwan Thomas; Jamie Baulch; Mark Richardson; Roger Black; Mark Hylton*; Du'aine Ladejo* | Jamaica; Michael McDonald; Greg Haughton; Roxbert Martin; Davian Clarke; Dennis Blake*; Garth Robinson* |

* Athletes who participated in the heats only and received medals.

== Records ==
These were the standing world and Olympic records (in minutes) prior to the 1996 Summer Olympics.

| World record | 2:54.29 | (United States) Michael Johnson (United States) Andrew Valmon (United States) Butch Reynolds (United States) Quincy Watts | Stuttgart (GER) | August 22, 1993 |
| Olympic record | 2:55.74 | (United States) Andrew Valmon (United States) Quincy Watts (United States) Michael Johnson (United States) Steve Lewis | Barcelona (ESP) | August 8, 1992 |

== Results ==
=== Heats ===
Qualification: First 2 in each heat (Q) and the next 6 fastest (q) qualified to the semifinals.

| Rank | Heat | Nation | Athletes | Time | Notes |
|---|---|---|---|---|---|
| 1 | 2 | United States | LaMont Smith, Jason Rouser, Derek Mills, Anthuan Maybank | 3:00.56 | Q |
| 2 | 1 | Great Britain | Du'aine Ladejo, Jamie Baulch, Mark Hylton, Mark Richardson | 3:01.79 | Q |
| 3 | 1 | Poland | Piotr Rysiukiewicz, Paweł Januszewski, Robert Maćkowiak, Piotr Haczek | 3:01.92 | Q |
| 4 | 1 | Brazil | Éverson Teixeira, Valdinei da Silva, Osmar dos Santos, Sanderlei Parrela | 3:02.51 | q |
| 5 | 3 | Kenya | Samson Yego, Simon Kemboi, Kennedy Ochieng, Julius Chepkwony | 3:02.52 | Q |
| 6 | 3 | Senegal | Tapha Diarra, Aboubakry Dia, Hachim Ndiaye, Ibou Faye | 3:02.61 | Q |
| 7 | 3 | Nigeria | Udeme Ekpeyong, Clement Chukwu, Ayuba Machem, Sunday Bada | 3:02.73 | q |
| 8 | 4 | Jamaica | Gregory Haughton, Dennis Blake, Roxbert Martin, Garth Robinson | 3:02.81 | Q |
| 9 | 5 | Japan | Shunji Karube, Jun Osakada, Shigekazu Omori, Kenji Tabata | 3:02.82 | Q |
| 10 | 3 | Switzerland | Laurent Clerc, Kevin Widmer, Alain Rohr, Mathias Rusterholz | 3:03.05 | q |
| 11 | 4 | Italy | Marco Vaccari, Alessandro Aimar, Andrea Nuti, Ashraf Saber | 3:03.60 | Q |
| 12 | 1 | Australia | Mark Ladbrook, Michael Joubert, Paul Greene, Cameron Mackenzie | 3:03.73 | q |
| 13 | 4 | South Africa | Alfred Visagie, Arnaud Malherbe, Hendrik Mokganyetsi, Bobang Phiri | 3:03.79 | q |
| 14 | 5 | Bahamas | Troy McIntosh, Timothy Munnings, Theron Cooper, Dennis Darling | 3:04.09 | Q |
| 15 | 5 | Saudi Arabia | Mohammed al-Beshi, Hashim Al-Sharfa, Saleh Al-Saydan, Hadi Somayli | 3:04.67 | q |
| 16 | 2 | Russia | Innokenty Zharov, Mikhail Vdovin, Ruslan Mashchenko, Dmitriy Kosov | 3:04.73 | Q |
| 17 | 5 | Germany | Rico Lieder, Andreas Hein, Kai Karsten, Thomas Schönlebe | 3:05.16 | |
| 18 | 2 | Ghana | Solomon Amegatcher, Abu Duah, Julius Sedame, Ahmed Ali | 3:05.53 | |
| 19 | 2 | Cuba | Omar Meña, Jorge Crusellas, Georkis Vera, Roberto Hernández | 3:05.75 | |
| 20 | 3 | Saint Vincent and the Grenadines | Eswort Coombs, Thomas Dickson, Eversley Linley, Erasto Sampson | 3:06.52 | |
| 21 | 5 | Botswana | Aggripa Matshameko, Keteng Baloseng, Rampa Mosveu, Johnson Kubisa | 3:06.62 | |
| 22 | 4 | Mauritius | Gilbert Hashan, Désiré Pierre-Louis, Rudy Tirvengadum, Éric Milazar | 3:08.17 | |
| 23 | 2 | Qatar | Mubarak Sultan Al-Nubi Faraj, Ali Ismail Doka, Sami al-Abdulla, Hamad al-Dosari | 3:08.25 | |
| 24 | 2 | Antigua and Barbuda | N'kosie Barnes, Michael Terry, Mitchell Browne, Howard Lindsay | 3:09.46 | |
| 25 | 1 | Saint Lucia | Dominic Johnson, Ivan Jean-Marie, Maxime Charlemagne, Max Seales | 3:10.51 | |
| 26 | 1 | Fiji | Soloveni Nakaunicina, Henry Semiti, Solomone Bole, Isireli Naikelekelevesi | 3:10.67 | |
| 27 | 1 | Sierra Leone | Foday Sillah, Haroun Korjie, Frank Turay, Prince Amara | 3:11.65 | |
| 28 | 4 | Zimbabwe | Julius Masvanise, Tawanda Chiwira, Savieri Ngidhi, Ken Harnden | 3:13.35 | |
| 29 | 2 | Lesotho | Isaac Seatile, Motlatsi Maseela, Makoekoe Mahanetsa, Mpho Morobe | 3:15.67 | |
| 30 | 3 | British Virgin Islands | Mario Todman, Steve Augustine, Greg Rhymer, Ralston Varlack | 3:17.30 | |
| 31 | 3 | Papua New Guinea | Samuel Bai, Ivan Wakit, Amos Ali, Subul Babo | 3:19.92 | |
| 32 | 4 | Maldives | Ahmed Shageef, Mohamed Amir, Naseer Ismail, Hussain Riyaz | 3:24.88 | |
| | 5 | The Gambia | Dawda Jallow, Momodou Drammeh, Lamin Drammeh, Assan John | DNF | |
| | 4 | Grenada | Richard Britton, Rufus Jones, Alleyne Francique, Clint Williams | DQ | |
| | 5 | Guyana | Andrew Harry, Roger Gill, Lancelot Gittens, Richard Jones | DQ | |

=== Semifinals ===
Qualification: First 4 in each heat (Q) qualified directly to the final.

| Rank | Heat | Nation | Athletes | Time | Notes |
|---|---|---|---|---|---|
| 1 | 2 | United States | LaMont Smith, Jason Rouser, Derek Mills, Anthuan Maybank | 2:57.87 | Q |
| 2 | 2 | Jamaica | Michael McDonald, Dennis Blake, Gregory Haughton, Roxbert Martin | 2:58.42 | Q |
| 3 | 1 | Great Britain | Iwan Thomas, Jamie Baulch, Du'aine Ladejo, Mark Richardson | 3:01.36 | Q |
| 4 | 1 | Senegal | Tapha Diarra, Aboubakry Dia, Hachim Ndiaye, Ibou Faye | 3:01.72 | Q |
| 5 | 1 | Kenya | Samson Kitur, Samson Yego, Simon Kemboi, Julius Chepkwony | 3:01.73 | Q |
| 6 | 2 | Japan | Shunji Karube, Jun Osakada, Shigekazu Omori, Koji Ito | 3:01.92 | Q |
| 7 | 2 | Bahamas | Troy McIntosh, Timothy Munnings, Theron Cooper, Dennis Darling | 3:02.17 | Q |
| 8 | 1 | Poland | Piotr Rysiukiewicz, Tomasz Jędrusik, Robert Maćkowiak, Piotr Haczek | 3:02.29 | Q |
| 9 | 2 | Italy | Fabrizio Mori, Alessandro Aimar, Andrea Nuti, Ashraf Saber | 3:02.56 | |
| 10 | 1 | South Africa | Alfred Visagie, Arnaud Malherbe, Hendrik Mokganyetsi, Bobang Phiri | 3:02.96 | |
| 11 | 1 | Brazil | Sanderlei Parrela, Valdinei da Silva, Éverson Teixeira, Eronilde de Araujo | 3:03.46 | |
| 12 | 1 | Australia | Mark Ladbrook, Michael Joubert, Paul Greene, Cameron Mackenzie | 3:04.55 | |
| 13 | 2 | Switzerland | Laurent Clerc, Kevin Widmer, Alain Rohr, Mathias Rusterholz | 3:05.36 | |
| 14 | 1 | Russia | Innokenty Zharov, Mikhail Vdovin, Ruslan Mashchenko, Dmitriy Kosov | 3:05.63 | |
| 15 | 2 | Saudi Arabia | Saleh Al-Saydan, Mohammed al-Beshi, Hashim Al-Sharfa, Hadi Somayli | 3:07.18 | |
| | 2 | Nigeria | Udeme Ekpeyong, Clement Chukwu, Ayuba Machem, Sunday Bada | DQ | |

=== Final ===
| Rank | Lane | Nation | Athletes | Time | Notes |
|---|---|---|---|---|---|
| 1st place, gold medalist(s) | 5 | United States | LaMont Smith, Alvin Harrison, Derek Mills, Anthuan Maybank | 2:55.99 | |
| 2nd place, silver medalist(s) | 6 | Great Britain | Iwan Thomas, Jamie Baulch, Mark Richardson, Roger Black | 2:56.60 | NR |
| 3rd place, bronze medalist(s) | 4 | Jamaica | Michael McDonald, Roxbert Martin, Gregory Haughton, Davian Clarke | 2:59.42 | |
| 4 | 3 | Senegal | Tapha Diarra, Aboubakry Dia, Hachim Ndiaye, Ibou Faye | 3:00.64 | NR |
| 5 | 7 | Japan | Shunji Karube, Koji Ito, Jun Osakada, Shigekazu Omori | 3:00.76 | |
| 6 | 4 | Poland | Piotr Rysiukiewicz, Tomasz Jędrusik, Piotr Haczek, Robert Maćkowiak | 3:00.96 | |
| 7 | 2 | Bahamas | Carl Oliver, Troy McIntosh, Dennis Darling, Timothy Munnings | 3:02.71 | |
| | 1 | Kenya | Samson Kitur, Samson Yego, Simon Kemboi, Julius Chepkwony | DNS | |

== See also ==
- Women's 4 × 400 m Relay
