= Lamont Smith =

Lamont Smith may refer to:

- LaMont Smith (born 1972), American Olympic athlete
- Lamont Smith (basketball) (born 1975), American basketball coach
