= Hachim Ndiaye =

Senegalese sprinter

Personal information
- Born: 28 October 1963 (age 62)

Sport
- Sport: Track and field
Medal record
Representing Senegal
African Championships
Gold medal – first place	1996 Yaoundé	4×400 m
Gold medal – first place	1998 Dakar	4×400 m
Silver medal – second place	1992 Belle Vue Harel	4×400 m
Bronze medal – third place	1989 Lagos	400 m
Bronze medal – third place	2000 Algiers	4×400 m

Hachim Ndiaye (born 28 October 1963) is a retired Senegalese sprinter who specialized in the 400 metres.

He is best known for finishing fourth in the 4 × 400 metres relay at the 1996 Olympic Games, together with Moustapha Diarra, Aboubakry Dia and Ibou Faye. The team ran in a Senegalese record.

Individually he won a bronze medal at the 1989 African Championships, a bronze medal at the 1989 Jeux de la Francophonie, and silver medals at the 1994 and 1997 Jeux de la Francophonie. He competed at the 1995 and 1997 World Championships without reaching the final.

His personal best time was 45.44 seconds (1994).
