= Mpho Morobe =

Mosotho sprinter

Personal information
- Nationality: Lesotho
- Born: 2 November 1966 (age 59)

Sport
- Sport: Sprinting
- Event: 400 metres

Mpho Jonas Morobe (born 2 November 1966) is a Lesotho sprinter. He anchored Lesotho's national record-setting 4 × 400 m team in 1996. He also competed in the men's 400 metres and 4 × 400 metres relay at the 1996 Summer Olympics.

== Career ==
In 1995, Morobe set his 400 metres personal best. He ran a time of 47.20 seconds.

Morobe entered in both the 400 m and 4 × 400 m relay at the 1996 Olympics. He ran 47.54 to place 7th in the 4th 400 m heat. As anchor of the 4 × 400 m, he ran 3:15.67 to place 7th in his heat. The time set a Lesotho national record that still stands as of 2025.

Morobe qualified for the 1998 Commonwealth Games in the 800 metres. In the 4th heat, he ran 1:51.45 to place 6th.

Morobe was a private in the Lesotho Defence Force. He competed at the International Military Sports Council East South Africa Liaison Office championships in 2000.

At the 2000 Bloemfontein meeting sponsored by Absa Group, Morobe ran 1:55.65 over 800 m to place 9th. He ran as a foreign national in the 2011 South African Athletics Championships, finishing 7th in his first-round 100 metres heat.
