= Keteng Baloseng =

Botswana sprinter

Personal information
- Nationality: Botswana
- Born: 26 February 1967 (age 59)

Sport
- Sport: Sprinting
- Event: 4 × 400 metres relay

Keteng Baloseng (born 26 February 1967) is a Botswana sprinter. He competed in the men's 4 × 400 metres relay at the 1996 Summer Olympics.
