= Andreas Hein =

German sprinter

Personal information
- Nationality: German
- Born: 9 September 1972 (age 54) Wetzlar, West Germany

Sport
- Sport: Sprinting
- Event: 4 × 400 metres relay

Andreas Hein (born 9 September 1972) is a German sprinter. He competed in the men's 4 × 400 metres relay at the 1996 Summer Olympics.
