= Clint Williams =

Grenadian athlete (born 1977)

Personal information
- Full name: Clint Williams
- Born: May 16, 1977 (age 49) Grenada

Achievements and titles
- Personal best: 400m: 49.61 (1996)

Clint Williams (born May 16, 1977) is a retired Grenadian athlete who specialized in 400 metres, he represented Grenada as part of its first Olympic 4 × 400m Relay team which was disqualified at the 1996 Summer Olympics.

== Competition record ==
Year	Competition	Venue	Position	Event	Notes
Representing Grenada
1996	Olympic Games	Atlanta, United States	–	4 × 400 m	DQ
