= Cameron Mackenzie (athlete) =

Australian sprinter

Personal information
- Nationality: Australian
- Born: 10 January 1970 (age 56)

Sport
- Sport: Sprinting
- Event: 4 × 400 metres relay

Cameron Mackenzie (born 10 January 1970) is an Australian sprinter. He competed in the men's 4 × 400 metres relay at the 1996 Summer Olympics.
