= Assan John =

Gambian sprinter

Personal information
- Nationality: Gambian
- Born: 18 January 1978 (age 48)

Sport
- Sport: Sprinting
- Event: 4 × 400 metres relay

Assan John (born 18 January 1978) is a Gambian sprinter. He competed in the men's 4 × 400 metres relay at the 1996 Summer Olympics.
