= Kevin Cole =

American artist (born 1960)

Kevin Cole (born 1960) is an African-American artist and educator. He has created more than 45 public art works including a 55-foot long installation for the Atlanta International Airport, and the Coca-Cola Centennial Olympic Mural for the 1996 Olympic games.

== Biography ==
Kevin Cole was born in Pine Bluff, Arkansas, on January 19, 1960. At the age of 8, he visited the Arkansas Arts Center (now the Arkansas Museum of Fine Arts) for the first time with his mother and was inspired to create art. As an adolescent, he struggled with a speech impediment and used art as therapy. It was this disorder that led him to seek a career in art education. After earning graduate degrees in art and art education, he began his teaching career in College Park, Georgia in 1985 as an art teacher in Camp Creek Middle School. He later became an adjunct professor in the School of Art and Design at Georgia State University where he remained until 1998. Over the course of his teaching career, he earned 51 teaching awards. Cole is a prolific artist who paints and creates mixed-media sculptures of wood and metal with his signature necktie motif. During the course of his thirty-year career, he has won over a hundred grants and awards in art. In 2018, he was inducted into the Arkansas Black Hall of Fame, and in 2021, he was featured on Fox16 News during Black History Month along with artist Smokie Norful

== Education ==
Kevin Cole received his BS in Art Education from the University of Arkansas at Pine Bluff in 1982. He earned an M.A. in Art Education from the University of Illinois in Urbana, Illinois in 1983, and his M.F.A in Drawing from Northern Illinois University in Dekalb in 1984.

== Artworks ==
Cole's art deals with themes of living in a post-slavery society where Black people are still struggling to have equal rights and opportunities as others. He refers to the term "Post-Blackness" described by Touré as being "identified such that their work can be seen beyond the sociological/stereotypical definition of “Black Art.”" His art involves motifs and imagery of knots, tangles, and loops in reference to a story his grandfather told him as a teen in which African Americans who were on their way to vote were lynched from a tree by their neck ties. The colorful shapes and patterns also aim to represent the souls of those who overcome adversity in their everyday lives.

Cole was commissioned to create his "Soul Ties that Matter" piece by Hartsfield Jackson International Airport located in Atlanta, GA, which is currently located in Concourse F of the airport. The piece measures 20'x55'x16" and is a public work depicting metal tangles and knots that follow the rough shape of the different continents of the world.

In 1994, he was commissioned to complete the Coca-Cola Centennial Olympic Mural for the 1996 Olympic games. This mural measured 800 square feet, spanning across a 15-story building, and took Cole two years to complete. The mural depicts portraits of various people, along with the outline of the Coca-Cola bottle.

== Exhibitions ==
In 2003, Cole received an invitation to become a member of AfriCOBRA (African Commune of Bad Relevant Artists). As a member of AfriCOBRA, a group of Black artists that started in 1968 to explore themes of Black identity and visual aesthetics, Cole participated in an AfriCOBRA exhibition in 2018 in the Mosaic Templars Cultural Center in Little Rock, Arkansas.

In 2012, his 25-year retrospective titled, Straight from the Soul, was held at the Museum of Modern Art (MoMA), Georgia.

In the beginning of 2020, Cole had a solo exhibition titled "Kevin Cole: Soul Ties", curated by Shawnya L. Harris and Brenda A. Thompson, in the Georgia Museum.

== Collections ==
Kevin Cole's work is in the permanent collections of major metropolitan museums including, the Smithsonian National Museum of African American History and Culture, MoMA Georgia, Ogden Museum, Georgia Museum of Art, and the Yale University Art Gallery.

His work can also be found in corporate collections including Bank of America and IBM.
