= Momodou Drammeh =

Gambian sprinter

Personal information
- Nationality: Gambian
- Born: 26 October 1978 (age 47)

Sport
- Sport: Sprinting
- Event: 4 × 400 metres relay

Momodou Lamin Drammeh (born 26 October 1978) is a Gambian sprinter. He competed in the men's 4 × 400 metres relay at the 1996 Summer Olympics.
