= Saleh Al-Saydan =

Saudi Arabian sprinter

Personal information
- Nationality: Saudi Arabian
- Born: 11 September 1978 (age 47)

Sport
- Sport: Sprinting
- Event: 4 × 400 metres relay

Saleh Al-Saydan (born 11 September 1978) is a Saudi Arabian sprinter. He competed in the men's 4 × 400 metres relay at the 1996 Summer Olympics.
