= Rufus Jones (athlete) =

Grenadian sprinter

Personal information
- Nationality: Grenadian
- Born: 10 January 1976 (age 50)

Sport
- Sport: Sprinting
- Event: 4 × 400 metres relay

Rufus Jones (born 10 January 1976) is a Grenadian sprinter. He competed in the men's 4 × 400 metres relay at the 1996 Summer Olympics.
