= Julius Sedame =

Ghanaian sprinter

Personal information
- Nationality: Ghanaian
- Born: 16 December 1974 (age 51)

Sport
- Sport: Sprinting
- Event: 4 × 400 metres relay

Julius Sedame (born 16 December 1974) is a Ghanaian sprinter. He competed in the men's 4 × 400 metres relay at the 1996 Summer Olympics.
