= 2006–07 Real Madrid CF season =

106th season in existence of Real Madrid CF

Real Madrid
2006–07 season
- President: Ramón Calderón
- Head coach: Fabio Capello
- Stadium: Santiago Bernabéu
- La Liga: 1st
- Copa del Rey: Round of 16
- UEFA Champions League: Round of 16
- Top goalscorer: League: Ruud van Nistelrooy (25); All: Ruud van Nistelrooy (33)
- Biggest win: Real Madrid 5–1 Dynamo Kyiv; Real Madrid 5–1 Écija Balompié
- Biggest defeat: Real Madrid 0–3 Recreativo Huelva
Home colours	Away colours	Third colours

The 2006–07 season was Real Madrid CF's 76th season in La Liga. This article lists all matches that the club played in the 2006–07 season, and also shows statistics of the club's players.

== Season summary ==
The summer of 2006 saw Real choose a new and returning coach, Fabio Capello coming from Juventus in the wake of Calciopoli.

Capello brought several recent and previous Juventus players with him to the club, but not all of them made a huge impact, the team instead relying on the goals of Ruud van Nistelrooy for the whole season.

Real returned to domestic league glory after a 3–1 victory against Mallorca in the last game of the season, but the club surprisingly sacked Capello shortly after winning the La Liga title after Capello refused to field David Beckham and Ronaldo as well as his defensive tactics. He was replaced by a surprise candidate Bernd Schuster from Getafe for the following season.

On the other hand, Real Madrid suffered painful exits in the Round of 16 of the Copa del Rey against Real Betis as well as in the UEFA Champions League against Bayern Munich in the Round of 16.

== Players ==
Note: Flags indicate national team as defined under FIFA eligibility rules; some limited exceptions apply. Players may hold more than one non-FIFA nationality.

No.	Pos.	Nation	Player
1	GK	ESP	Iker Casillas
2	DF	ESP	Míchel Salgado
3	DF	BRA	Roberto Carlos
4	DF	ESP	Sergio Ramos
5	DF	ITA	Fabio Cannavaro
6	MF	MLI	Mahamadou Diarra
7	FW	ESP	Raúl
8	MF	BRA	Emerson
9	FW	BRA	Ronaldo
10	FW	BRA	Robinho
11	DF	BRA	Cicinho
12	DF	BRA	Marcelo
13	GK	ESP	Diego López
14	MF	ESP	Guti
15	DF	ESP	Raúl Bravo
16	MF	ARG	Fernando Gago
17	FW	NED	Ruud van Nistelrooy
18	FW	ITA	Antonio Cassano
19	MF	ESP	José Antonio Reyes
20	FW	ARG	Gonzalo Higuaín
21	DF	ESP	Iván Helguera

No.	Pos.	Nation	Player
22	DF	ESP	Francisco Pavón
23	MF	ENG	David Beckham
24	DF	ESP	Álvaro Mejía
25	DF	ESP	Oscar Minambres
26	DF	ESP	Javi García
27	MF	ESP	Rubén de la Red
28	GK	ESP	Antonio Adán
29	GK	ESP	Kiko Casilla
30	FW	ESP	Alberto Bueno
31	FW	ESP	Rayco García
32	MF	ESP	Adrián González
33	MF	ESP	Esteban Granero
34	MF	ESP	Juan Mata
36	MF	ESP	Nieto
37	FW	ESP	Marcos Tébar
38	DF	ESP	Miguel Torres
39	DF	ESP	Borja Valero
44	DF	ESP	Sergio Díaz
—	MF	BRA	Júlio Baptista
—	DF	ENG	Jonathan Woodgate

=== Transfers ===
Real Madrid 2006-07 – first team shirt numbers

==== In ====
No.	Pos.	Nat.	Name	Age	EU	Moving from	Type	Transfer window	Ends	Transfer fee	Source
5	DF	(Italy)	Fabio Cannavaro	32	EU	Juventus (Italy)	Signed	Summer	2009	€10,000,000	Realmadrid
8	DM	(Brazil)	Emerson	29	EU	Juventus (Italy)	Signed	Summer	2009	€10,000,000	Realmadrid
17	FW	(Netherlands)	Ruud van Nistelrooy	30	EU	Manchester United (England)	Signed	Summer	2009	€15,000,000	Realmadrid
6	DM	(Mali)	Mahamadou Diarra	25	Non-EU	Lyon (France)	Signed	Summer	2011	€26,000,000	Realmadrid
19	MF	(Spain)	José Antonio Reyes	22	EU	Arsenal (England)	Loaned	Summer	1 year	Loan	Realmadrid
16	DM	(Argentina)	Fernando Gago	22	EU	Boca Juniors (Argentina)	Signed	Winter	2013	€20,000,000	Realmadrid
20	FW	(Argentina)	Gonzalo Higuaín	18	EU	River Plate (Argentina)	Signed	Winter	2013	€13,000,000	Realmadrid
12	DF	(Brazil)	Marcelo	18	Non-EU	Fluminense (Brazil)	Signed	Winter	2013	€6,500,000	Realmadrid

Total spending: ▼€100,500,000

==== Out ====
No.	Pos.	Nat.	Name	Age	EU	Moving to	Type	Transfer window	Transfer fee	Source
5	MF	(France)	Zinedine Zidane	34	EU		Retired	Summer	n/a	Realmadrid
9	CF	(Brazil)	Ronaldo	31	EU	Milan (Italy)	Transfer	Winter	€7,500,000	Realmadrid
27	CF	(Spain)	Roberto Soldado		EU	Osasuna	Loan	Summer		
26	RB	(Spain)	Álvaro Arbeloa		EU	Deportivo La Coruña	Transfer	Summer	€1,300,000	
29	MF	(Spain)	José Manuel Jurado		EU	Atlético Madrid	Transfer	Summer	€3,000,000	
17	FW	(Spain)	Javier Portillo		EU	Gimnàstic	Free transfer	Summer		
35	FW	(Spain)	Javier Balboa		EU	Racing Santander	Loan	Summer		
28	MF	(Spain)	Rubén		EU	Racing Santander	Loan	Summer		
21	MF	(Uruguay)	Carlos Diogo		Non-EU	Real Zaragoza	Loan	Summer		
12	MF	(Uruguay)	Pablo García		Non-EU	Celta de Vigo	Loan	Summer		
32	MF	(Spain)	Juanfran		EU	Osasuna	Loan	Summer		
16	MF	(Denmark)	Thomas Gravesen		EU	Celtic	Transfer	Summer		
18	MF	(England)	Jonathan Woodgate		EU	Middlesbrough (England)	Loan	Summer		
4	MF	(Spain)	Borja		EU	Real Valladolid	Transfer	Summer		
8	MF	(Brazil)	Júlio Baptista		Non-EU	Arsenal (England)	Loan	Summer		

== Club ==
=== Technical staff ===
Position	Staff
Head coach	(Italy) Fabio Capello
Second coach	(Italy) Italo Galbiati
Third coach	(Spain) Toni Grande
Physical trainer	(Italy) Massimo Neri
Goalkeepers coach	(Italy) Franco Tancredi

Last updated: 24 Sep 2007
Source: Realmadrid and realmadridfans

=== Kit ===
Supplier: Adidas
Sponsor(s): BenQ-Siemens

Home	Away	Third

Source: "New Real Madrid 2006/2007 Kit". Real Madrid. Archived from the original on 2007-07-18.

=== Other information ===
President	(Spain) Ramón Calderón
Honorary Life President	(Argentina) (Spain) Alfredo Di Stéfano
Vice-president	(Spain) José Ignacio Rivero Pradera
Vice-president	(Spain) Vicente Boluda Fos
Director of football	(Montenegro) Predrag Mijatović
Technical Secretary	(Spain) Miguel Ángel Portugal
Ground (capacity and dimensions)	Santiago Bernabéu (80.400 / 107x72m)
Budget	$478 m

Updated to match played 24 Sep 2007
Source: Realmadrid and Organizational Structure on Realmadrid Santiago Bernabéu Stadium and Budget

=== Pre-season and friendlies ===
Match	Date	Competition or tour	Ground	Opponent	Score^{1}	GD
1	21 Jul 2006	Austria-Tour	N	Plymouth Argyle	1 - 0	1
2	25 Jul 2006	Austria-Tour	N	Bad Aussee	10 - 2	8
3	29 Jul 2006	Austria-Tour	N	Fulham	0 - 0	0
4	3 Aug 2006	Austria-Tour	N	Reggina	1 - 0	1
5	9 Aug 2006	US-Tour	N	D.C. United	1 - 1	0
6	12 Aug 2006	US-Tour	A	Real Salt Lake	2 - 0	2
7	18 Aug 2006	Trofeo Ramón de Carranza	N	Betis	3 - 3 (4-5 pen.)	0
8	19 Aug 2006	Trofeo Ramón de Carranza	N	Villarreal	0 - 1	-1
9	24 Aug 2006	Trofeo Santiago Bernabéu	H	Anderlecht	2 - 1	1
10	23 Dec 2006	Jesús Gil y Gil Memorial Trophy	H	Atlético Madrid	0 - 0 (3-4 pen.)	0
11	19 June 2007	Peace Match	N	Israel	8 - 0	8

Last updated: 26 Jul 2007
Source: Real Madrid, Real Madrid preseason 2006 Calendar and Real Madrid preseason 2006 Special Reports, Trofeo Santiago Bernabéu
^{1}Real Madrid goals come first.
Country's flag depict country of foreign team to that of Real Madrid.
Ground: H = Home; A = Away; N = Neutral; HR = Home replacement; AR = Away replacement; GD = Goal difference

== Competitions ==
=== La Liga ===
==== League table ====
Pos	Team	Pld	W	D	L	GF	GA	GD	Pts	Qualification or relegation
1	Real Madrid (C)	38	23	7	8	66	40	+26	76 (Note: RMA 2–0 BAR; BAR 3–3 RMA)	Qualification for the Champions League group stage
2	Barcelona	38	22	10	6	78	33	+45	76	Qualification for the Champions League group stage
3	Sevilla	38	21	8	9	64	35	+29	71	Qualification for the Champions League third qualifying round
4	Valencia	38	20	6	12	57	42	+15	66	Qualification for the Champions League third qualifying round
5	Villarreal	38	18	8	12	48	44	+4	62	Qualification for the UEFA Cup first round

Source: LFP
Rules for classification: 1st points; 2nd head-to-head points; 3rd head-to-head goal difference; 4th head-to-head goals scored; 5th goal difference; 6th number of goals scored; 7th Fair-play points
(C) Champions

==== Matches ====
27 August 2006 1	Real Madrid	0–0	Villarreal CF	Madrid
				Stadium: Santiago Bernabéu; Attendance: 80,300; Referee: Fernández Borbalán

10 September 2006 2	Levante	1–4	Real Madrid	Valencia
	Ettien 37'		van Nistelrooy 16', 56', 90+1'; Cassano 27'	Stadium: Ciudad de Valencia; Attendance: 23,205; Referee: Daudén Ibáñez

17 September 2006 3	Real Madrid	2–0	Real Sociedad	Madrid
	Reyes 69'; Beckham 90+3'			Stadium: Santiago Bernabéu; Attendance: 71,467; Referee: Muñiz Fernández

23 September 2006 4	Betis	0–1	Real Madrid	Sevilla
			Diarra 6'	Stadium: Manuel Ruiz de Lopera; Attendance: 54,945; Referee: Iturralde González

1 October 2006 5	Real Madrid	1–1	Atlético Madrid	Madrid
	38' Raúl	Report	6' Mista	Stadium: Santiago Bernabéu; Attendance: 80,300; Referee: Undiano Mallenco

14 October 2006 6	Getafe	1–0	Real Madrid	Getafe
	Alexis 59'			Stadium: Coliseum Alfonso Pérez; Attendance: 14,256; Referee: González Vázquez

22 October 2006 7	Real Madrid	2–0	Barcelona	Madrid
	Raúl 2' van Nistelrooy 51'	Report		Stadium: Santiago Bernabéu; Attendance: 80,300; Referee: Pérez Burrull

28 October 2006 8	Gimnàstic	1–3	Real Madrid	Tarragona
	Buades 29' (pen.)		Carlos 43'; Helguera 49'; Robinho 85'	Stadium: Nou Estadi de Tarragona; Attendance: 11,520; Referee: Mejuto González

5 November 2006 9	Real Madrid	1–2	Celta de Vigo	Madrid
	Emerson 42'	Report	Nenê 35'; Larena 82'	Stadium: Santiago Bernabéu; Attendance: 77,088

12 November 2006 10	Osasuna	1–4	Real Madrid	Pamplona
	Valdo 63'		van Nistelrooy 11', 26', 44', 84'	Stadium: Reyno de Navarra; Attendance: 17,910; Referee: Teixeira Vitienes

18 November 2006 11	Real Madrid	3–1	Racing Santander	Madrid
	Ramos 3'; Reyes 59'; Diarra 70'	Report	Garay 75'	Stadium: Santiago Bernabéu; Attendance: 59,422; Referee: Lizondo Cortés

26 November 2006 12	Valencia	0–1	Real Madrid	Valencia
			Raúl 51'	Stadium: Mestalla; Attendance: 55,000; Referee: Medina Cantalejo

3 December 2006 13	Real Madrid	2–1	Athletic Bilbao	Madrid
	Ronaldo 64'; Carlos 81'		Luis Prieto 34'	Stadium: Santiago Bernabéu; Attendance: 77,088; Referee: Rodríguez Santiago

9 December 2006 14	Sevilla	2–1	Real Madrid	Sevilla
	Kanouté 17'; Chevantón 77'		Beckham 12'	Stadium: Ramón Sánchez Pizjuán; Attendance: 45,500; Referee: Muñiz Fernández

17 December 2006 15	Espanyol	0–1	Real Madrid	Barcelona
			van Nistelrooy 49'	Stadium: Estadi Olímpic Lluís Companys; Attendance: 50,400; Referee: Pérez Lasa

20 December 2006 16	Real Madrid	0–3	Recreativo	Madrid
		Report	Pongolle 35'; Uche 51'; Viqueira 90'	Stadium: Santiago Bernabéu; Attendance: 64,240; Referee: Daudén Ibáñez

7 January 2007 17	Deportivo La Coruña	2–0	Real Madrid	A Coruña
	Capdevila 9'; Cristian 55'	Report		Stadium: Estadio Riazor; Attendance: 31,140; Referee: Ramírez Domínguez

14 January 2007 18	Real Madrid	1–0	Zaragoza	Madrid
	van Nistelrooy 41'			Stadium: Santiago Bernabéu; Attendance: 64,240; Referee: Ayza Gámez

21 January 2007 19	Mallorca	0–1	Real Madrid	Mallorca
			Reyes 77'	Stadium: Son Moix; Attendance: 20,790; Referee: Fernández Borbalán

27 January 2007 20	Villarreal	1–0	Real Madrid	Villarreal
	Senna 68'			Stadium: El Madrigal; Attendance: 22,080; Referee: Clos Gómez

4 February 2007 21	Real Madrid	0–1	Levante	Madrid
		Report	Salva 11' (pen.)	Stadium: Santiago Bernabéu; Attendance: 64,240; Referee: Álvarez Izquierdo

10 February 2007 22	Real Sociedad	1–2	Real Madrid	San Sebastián
	Aranburu 7'		Beckham 37' van Nistelrooy 48'	Stadium: Anoeta; Attendance: 24,000

17 February 2007 23	Real Madrid	0–0	Real Betis	Madrid
		Report		Stadium: Santiago Bernabéu; Attendance: 64,240

25 February 2007 24	Atlético Madrid	1–1	Real Madrid	Madrid
	Torres 11'		Higuaín 62'	Stadium: Vicente Calderón; Attendance: 62,000; Referee: Daudén Ibáñez

4 March 2007 25	Real Madrid	1–1	Getafe	Madrid
	van Nistelrooy 45' (pen.)	Report	Güiza 38'	Stadium: Santiago Bernabéu; Attendance: 68,255; Referee: Teixeira Vitienes

10 March 2007 26	Barcelona	3–3	Real Madrid	Barcelona
	Messi 11', 28', 90'		van Nistelrooy 5', 13' (pen.); Ramos 73'	Stadium: Camp Nou; Attendance: 98,200; Referee: Undiano Mallenco

18 March 2007 27	Real Madrid	2–0	Gimnàstic	Madrid
	Robinho 56'; García 82' (o.g.)	Report		Stadium: Santiago Bernabéu; Attendance: 80,300; Referee: Iturralde González

1 April 2007 28	Celta de Vigo	1–2	Real Madrid	Vigo
	Ángel 44'	Report	van Nistelrooy 27' (pen.); Robinho 83'	Stadium: Balaídos; Attendance: 31,482; Referee: Pérez Burrull

8 April 2007 29	Real Madrid	2–0	Osasuna	Madrid
	Raúl 23'; Robinho 80'	Report		Stadium: Santiago Bernabéu; Attendance: 72,270; Referee: Ramírez Domínguez

14 April 2007 30	Racing Santander	2–1	Real Madrid	Santander
	Garay 73' (pen.), 90'	Report	Raúl 33'	Stadium: El Sardinero; Attendance: 21,658; Referee: Turienzo Álvarez

21 April 2007 31	Real Madrid	2–1	Valencia	Madrid
	van Nistelrooy 17'; Ramos 73'	Report	Morientes 51'	Stadium: Santiago Bernabéu; Attendance: 80,300; Referee: Pérez Lasa

29 April 2007 32	Athletic Bilbao	1–4	Real Madrid	Bilbao
	Llorente 80'	Report	Ramos 14' van Nistelrooy 34', 49'; Guti 83'	Stadium: San Mamés; Attendance: 36,000; Referee: Muñiz Fernández

6 May 2007 33	Real Madrid	3–2	Sevilla	Madrid
	van Nistelrooy 62', 85'; Robinho 78'	Report	Maresca 41'; Chevantón 94'	Stadium: Santiago Bernabéu; Attendance: 80,300; Referee: Pérez Burrull

12 May 2007 34	Real Madrid	4–3	Espanyol	Madrid
	van Nistelrooy 29'; Raúl 48'; Reyes 56'; Higuaín 89'	Report	Walter Pandiani 15', 26', 34'	Stadium: Santiago Bernabéu; Attendance: 80,300; Referee: Undiano Mallenco

20 May 2007 35	Recreativo	2–3	Real Madrid	Huelva
	Vázquez 74' (pen.); Uche 86'	Report	Robinho 9' van Nistelrooy 53' (pen.); Carlos 90+1'	Stadium: Nuevo Colombino; Attendance: 19,800; Referee: Mejuto González

26 May 2007 36	Real Madrid	3–1	Deportivo La Coruña	Madrid
	Ramos 29'; Raúl 58' van Nistelrooy 75'	Report	Capdevila 55'	Stadium: Santiago Bernabéu; Attendance: 80,300; Referee: Fernández Borbalán

9 June 2007 37	Real Zaragoza	2–2	Real Madrid	Zaragoza
	Milito 32' (pen.), 64'	Report	van Nistelrooy 57', 89'	Stadium: La Romareda; Attendance: 34,500; Referee: Undiano Mallenco

17 June 2007 38	Real Madrid	3–1	Mallorca	Madrid
	Reyes 68', 83'; Diarra 80'	Report	Varela 17'	Stadium: Santiago Bernabéu; Attendance: 80,300; Referee: Muñiz Fernández

==== Results summary ====
Overall								Home						Away					
Pld	W	D	L	GF	GA	GD	Pts	W	D	L	GF	GA	GD	W	D	L	GF	GA	GD
38	23	7	8	66	40	+26	76	12	4	3	32	18	+14	11	3	5	34	22	+12

Source: LFP

==== Results by round ====
Round	1	2	3	4	5	6	7	8	9	10	11	12	13	14	15	16	17	18	19	20	21	22	23	24	25	26	27	28	29	30	31	32	33	34	35	36	37	38
Ground	H	A	H	A	H	A	H	A	H	A	H	A	H	A	A	H	A	H	A	A	H	A	H	A	H	A	H	A	H	A	H	A	H	H	A	H	A	H
Result	D	W	W	W	D	L	W	W	L	W	W	W	W	L	W	L	L	W	W	L	L	W	D	D	D	D	W	W	W	L	W	W	W	W	W	W	D	W
Position	12	5	4	2	4	5	4	3	4	3	3	3	2	3	3	3	3	3	3	3	4	3	4	4	4	4	3	3	3	3	3	3	2	1	1	1	1	1

Source: Competitive Matches
A = Away; H = Home; W = Win; D = Draw; L = Loss

==== Points evolution ====
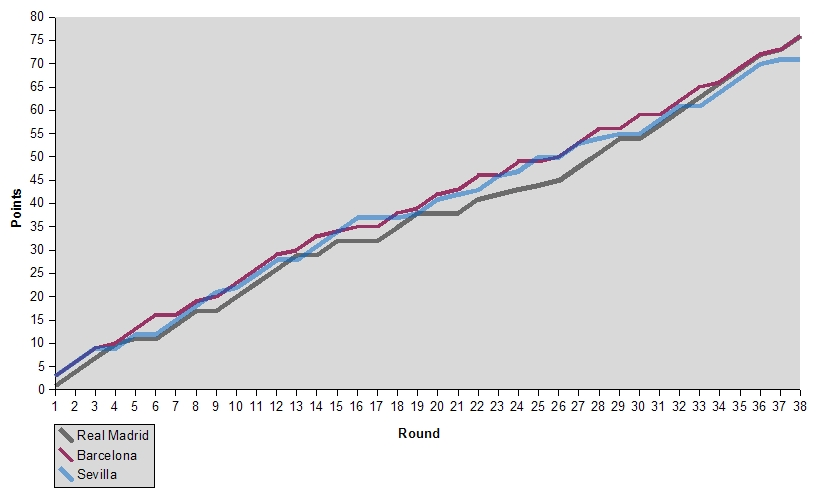
Source: LPF

==== Position evolution ====
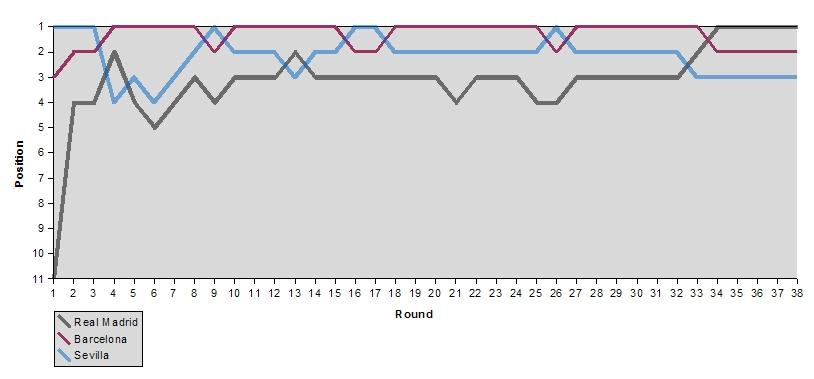
Source: LPF

=== Copa del Rey ===
==== Round of 32 ====
25 October 2006 1	Écija	1–1	Real Madrid	Écija
	Nolito 81'		Cassano 66'	Stadium: Estadio San Pablo; Referee: Julián Rodríguez Santiago

9 November 2006 2	Real Madrid	5–1 (6–2 agg.)	Écija	Madrid
	Beckham 48'; Ronaldo 68'; Van Nistelrooy 72', 78'; De la Red 88'		Carrizosa 77'	Stadium: Santiago Bernabéu; Referee: Álvarez Izquierdo

==== Round of 16 ====
11 January 2007 1	Real Betis	0–0	Real Madrid	Seville
				Stadium: Estadio de La Cartuja; Referee: Bernardino González Vázquez

18 January 2007 2	Real Madrid	1–1 (1–1 (a) agg.)	Real Betis	Madrid
	Robinho 4'		Dani 36'	Stadium: Santiago Bernabéu; Referee: Manuel Enrique Mejuto González

=== Champions League ===
==== Group E ====
Pos	Team	Pld	W	D	L	GF	GA	GD	Pts	Qualification
1	(France) Lyon	6	4	2	0	12	3	+9	14	Advance to knockout stage
2	(Spain) Real Madrid	6	3	2	1	14	8	+6	11	Advance to knockout stage
3	(Romania) Steaua București	6	1	2	3	7	11	−4	5	Transfer to UEFA Cup
4	(Ukraine) Dynamo Kyiv	6	0	2	4	5	16	−11	2	

Source: RSSSF

13 September 2006 1	Lyon (France)	2–0	(Spain) Real Madrid	Lyon
	Fred 11'; Tiago 31'	Report		Stadium: Stade de Gerland (France); Attendance: 42,000; Referee: Stark (Germany)

26 September 2006 2	Real Madrid (Spain)	5–1	(Ukraine) FC Dynamo Kyiv	Madrid
20:45	Van Nistelrooy 20', 70' (pen.); Raúl 27', 61'; Reyes 45+1'	Report	Milevskyi 47'	Stadium: Estadio Santiago Bernabéu; Attendance: 80,300; Referee: Poll (England)

17 October 2006 3	Steaua București (Romania)	1–4	(Spain) Real Madrid	Bucharest
20:45	Badea 64'	Report	Ramos 9'; Raúl 34'; Robinho 56'; Van Nistelrooy 76'	Stadium: Steaua Stadium (Romania); Attendance: 28,000; Referee: Rosetti (Italy)

1 November 2006 4	Real Madrid (Spain)	1–0	(Romania) Steaua București	Madrid
20:45	Nicoliță 70' (o.g.)	Report		Stadium: Estadio Santiago Bernabéu; Attendance: 80,300; Referee: Plautz (Austria)

21 November 2006 5	Real Madrid (Spain)	2–2	(France) Lyon	Madrid
20:45 CET	Diarra 39'; Van Nistelrooy 83'	Report	Carew 11'; Malouda 31'	Stadium: Estadio Santiago Bernabéu; Attendance: 80,300; Referee: Hauge (Norway)

6 December 2006 6	FC Dynamo Kyiv (Ukraine)	2–2	(Spain) Real Madrid	Kyiv
20:45 CET	Shatskikh 13', 27'	Report	Ronaldo 86', 88' (pen.)	Stadium: Valeriy Lobanovskyi Stadium (Ukraine); Attendance: 80,300; Referee: Riley (England)

==== Round of 16 ====
20 February 2007 1	Real Madrid (Spain)	3–2	(Germany) Bayern Munich	Madrid
20:45	Raúl 10', 28'; Van Nistelrooy 34'	Report	Lúcio 23'; Van Bommel 88'	Stadium: Estadio Santiago Bernabéu; Attendance: 80,300; Referee: De Bleeckere (Belgium)

7 March 2007 2	Bayern Munich (Germany)	2–1	(Spain) Real Madrid	Munich
20:45	Makaay 1'; Lúcio 66'	Report	Van Nistelrooy 83' (pen.)	Stadium: Allianz Arena (Germany); Attendance: 69,500; Referee: Micheľ (Slovakia)

== Statistics ==
=== Squad stats ===
				Total				La Liga		UEFA Champions League		Copa del Rey		Others^{1}		
N	Pos.	Name	Nat.	GS	App	Gls	Min	App	Gls	App	Gls	App	Gls	App	Gls	Notes
1	GK	Casillas	(Spain)	45	45			38		7						
4	RB	Sergio Ramos	(Spain)	41	39	7		33	6	6	1					
5	DF	Cannavaro	(Italy)	38	38			32		6						
21	DF	Iván Helguera	(Spain)	28	23	1		23	1							
3	LB	Roberto Carlos	(Brazil)	31	31	3		23	3	8						
6	DM	M. Diarra	(Mali)	39	40	4		33	3	7	1					
8	DM	Emerson	(Brazil)	33	28	1		28	1							
14	MF	Guti	(Spain)	26	30	1		30	1							
7	SS	Raúl	(Spain)	39	42	12		35	7	7	5					
10	LW	Robinho	(Brazil)	25	32	8		32	8							
17	FW	Ruud van Nistelrooy	(Netherlands)	45	47	33		37	25	7	6	3	2			
2	DF	M. Salgado	(Spain)	16	17			16		1						
9	FW	Ronaldo	(Brazil)	13	13	4		7	1	4	2	2	1			
11	RB	Cicinho	(Brazil)	6	7			7								
12	DF	Marcelo	(Brazil)	1	6			6								
13	GK	Diego López	(Spain)	3												
15	RB	Raúl Bravo	(Spain)	4	8			8								
16	DM	Gago	(Argentina)	17	15			13		2						
18	FW	Cassano	(Italy)	7	7	1		7	1							
19	SS	Reyes	(Spain)	17	30	7		30	7							
20	FW	Higuaín	(Argentina)	17	19	2		19	2							
22	DF	Francisco Pavón	(Spain)													
23	MF	David Beckham	(England)	17	23	3		23	3							
24	DF	Álvaro Mejía	(Spain)	5	9			9								
25	RB	Oscar Minambres	(Spain)													
26	DM	Javi García	(Spain)													
27	CM	Rubén de la Red	(Spain)	1	7			7								
28	GK	Antonio Adán	(Spain)													
29	GK	Kiko Casilla	(Spain)													
30	FW	Alberto Bueno	(Spain)													
31	FW	Rayco García	(Spain)													
32	AM	Adrián González	(Spain)													
33	AM	Esteban Granero	(Spain)													
34	FW	Juan Mata	(Spain)													
36	RW	Nieto	(Spain)	1	2			2								
37	MF	Marcos Tébar	(Spain)													
38	LB	M. Torres	(Spain)	2	18			18								
39	MF	Borja Valero	(Spain)													
44	DF	Sergio Díaz	(Spain)													
	MF	Baptista	(Brazil)													On loan to Arsenal
	CB	Woodgate	(England)													On Loan to Middlesbrough

Last updated: 7 October 2007
Source: LFP and Match reports in competitive matches
Ordered by {{{o}}}
0 shown as blank

== See also ==
- 2006–07 La Liga
- 2006–07 Copa del Rey
- 2006–07 UEFA Champions League
