= Ayuba Machem =

Nigerian sprinter

Personal information
- Nationality: Nigerian
- Born: 14 February 1973 (age 53)

Sport
- Sport: Sprinting
- Event: 4 × 400 metres relay

Ayuba Machem (born 14 February 1973) is a Nigerian sprinter. He competed in the men's 4 × 400 metres relay at the 1996 Summer Olympics.
