= Ibrahim Diarra =

France international rugby union player (1983–2019)

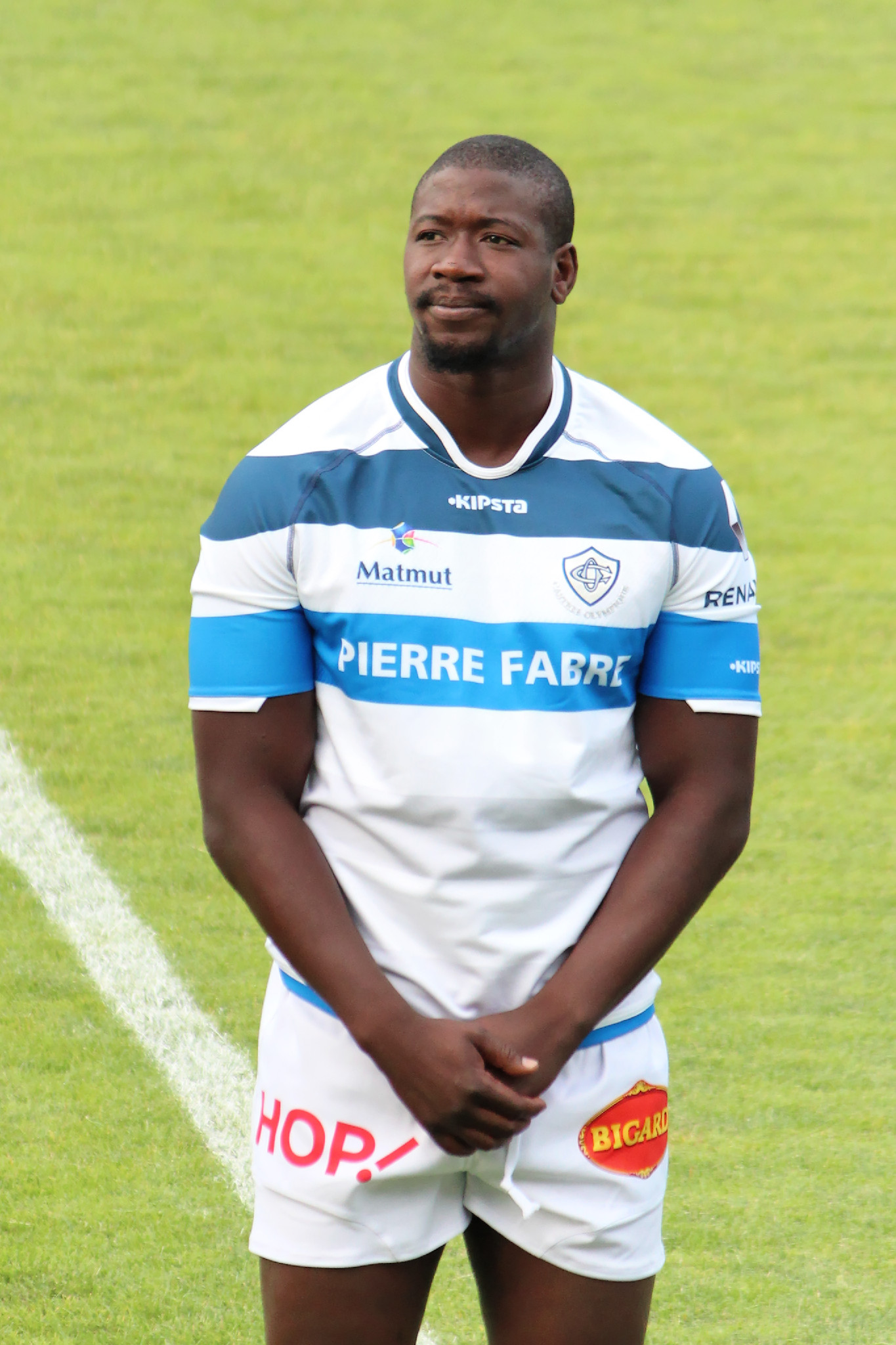
- Born: Ibrahim Diarra; 25 May 1983 Paris, France
- Died: 18 December 2019 (aged 36) Paris, France
- Height: 1.85 m (6 ft 1 in)
- Weight: 98 kg (15 st 6 lb)

Rugby union career
- Position: Flanker
Senior career
Years	Team	Apps	(Points)
2005–2009	Montauban	89	(25)
2009–2016	Castres	155	(35)
2016–2017	Section Paloise	1	(0)
2017–2018	A.S. Vaureenne	5	(0)
- Correct as of 9 December 2019
International career
Years	Team	Apps	(Points)
2008	France	1	(0)

Ibrahim Diarra (25 May 1983 – 18 December 2019) was a French rugby union footballer. He played as a flanker for Castres.

Diarra was born in Paris. He made his international debut for France in their fourth match of the 2008 Six Nations Championship against Italy on 9 March 2008. This was his only cap.

On 18 December 2019, Diarra died due to a cardiac event at the age of 36.

His half-brother Mohamadou played internationally for Senegal.

== Honours ==
=== Club ===
(France) Castres

- Top 14: 2012–13
