= Andrew Harry =

Guyanese sprinter

Personal information
- Nationality: Guyanese
- Born: 6 March 1968 (age 58)

Sport
- Sport: Sprinting
- Event: 4 × 400 metres relay

Andrew Harry (born 6 March 1968) is a Guyanese sprinter. He competed in the men's 4 × 400 metres relay at the 1996 Summer Olympics.
