= Kamohelo Mofolo =

Lesotho athlete (born 2005)

Personal information
- Born: 1 November 2005 (age 21)

Sport
- Sport: Athletics
- Event: Marathon
- Coached by: James McKirdy (McKirdy Trained)

Achievements and titles
- Personal bests: 10,000 m: 28:01.00 (Glasgow, 2026) NR; Half marathon: 1:00:52 (Gqeberha, 2025); 10K road: 27:47 (Durban, 2025) NR; Marathon: 2:06:26 (New York City, 2026)
Medal record
Men's athletics
Representing Lesotho
World Marathon Majors
Bronze medal – third place	2026 New York City	Marathon

Kamohelo Mofolo (born 1 November 2005) is a long-distance runner from Lesotho. He won bronze in the 2026 New York City Marathon becoming the first man from his country to medal in that major. He set the Lesotho national records in the 10k on both road and track. The latter he set at the 2026 Commonwealth Games where he competed in both the 5K and 10K events.
