= Cheick Diarra =

Cheick Diarra may refer to:

- Cheick Fantamady Diarra (born 1992), Malian footballer
- Cheick Modibo Diarra (born 1952), Malian astrophysicist and politician
- Cheick Sidi Diarra (born 1957), United Nations adviser

== See also ==
- Cheikh-Alan Diarra (born 1993), French professional footballer
