= Shigekazu Ōmori =

Japanese sprinter

Personal information
- Born: 9 July 1972 (age 54) Toyama Prefecture, Japan

Sport
- Sport: Track and field
Medal record
Representing Japan
Summer Universiade
Silver medal – second place	1993 Fukuoka	4x400 m relay
East Asian Games
Bronze medal – third place	1997 Busan	400 m

Shigekazu Ōmori (大森 盛一, Ōmori Shigekazu) (born 9 July 1972) is a retired Japanese sprinter who specialized in the 400 metres.

He finished fifth in 4 × 400 m relay at the 1996 Olympic Games, together with teammates Shunji Karube, Koji Ito and Jun Osakada. He also competed at the World Indoor Championships in 1993 and 1997 and the World Championships in 1993 and 1997 without reaching the final.

== Achievements ==
Year	Competition	Venue	Position	Notes
Representing Japan
1997	East Asian Games	Busan, South Korea	3rd	400 m
