= Ahmed Ali (Ghanaian sprinter) =

Ghanaian sprinter (born 1972)

Personal information
- Nationality: Ghanaian
- Born: 15 October 1972 (age 53)

Sport
- Sport: Sprinting
- Event: 4 × 400 metres relay

Ahmed Ali (born 15 October 1972) is a Ghanaian sprinter. He competed in the men's 4 × 400 metres relay at the 1996 Summer Olympics.
