= Drissa Diarra =

Drissa Diarra may refer to:

- Drissa Diarra (footballer, born 1985), Malian football midfielder
- Drissa Diarra (footballer, born 1999), Malian football defender
