= Ousmane Diarra =

Ousmane Diarra may refer to:

- Ousmane Diarra (Malian athlete) (born 1966), Malian sprint athlete
- Ousmane Diarra (French athlete) (born 1964), French-Senegalese sprinter/middle-distance runner and competitor at the 1988 Olympic Games
- Ousmane Diarra (footballer), Malian footballer and captain of AS Korofina
