= Harouna Diarra =

Malian footballer

Personal information
- Full name: Harouna Diarra
- Date of birth: 26 October 1978 (age 48)
- Place of birth: Mali
- Position: Midfielder

Senior career*
Years	Team	Apps	(Gls)
1996–1997	Real Bamako		
1997–2000	OFI	38	(7)
1999–2000	→ Naoussa (loan)	18	(4)
2000–2001	Panelefsiniakos	16	(2)
2001–2002	Paniliakos		
2002–2003	Kalamata	11	(0)
2003–2008	Stade Malien		

International career
1997–2006	Mali	6	(1)
- * Club domestic league appearances and goals

Harouna Diarra (born 26 October 1978) is a Malian former professional footballer who played as a midfielder.

== Club career ==
Diarra played for OFI in the Greek Alpha Ethniki from 1997 to 1999. He later played for Naoussa, Panelefsiniakos and Kalamata in the Greek Beta Ethniki.

== Personal ==
His younger brother is Mahamadou Diarra.

== International career ==
Diarra made six appearances for the Mali national football team, including 2000 African Cup of Nations qualifiers.
