= Ryan Ford (runner) =

American long-distance runner

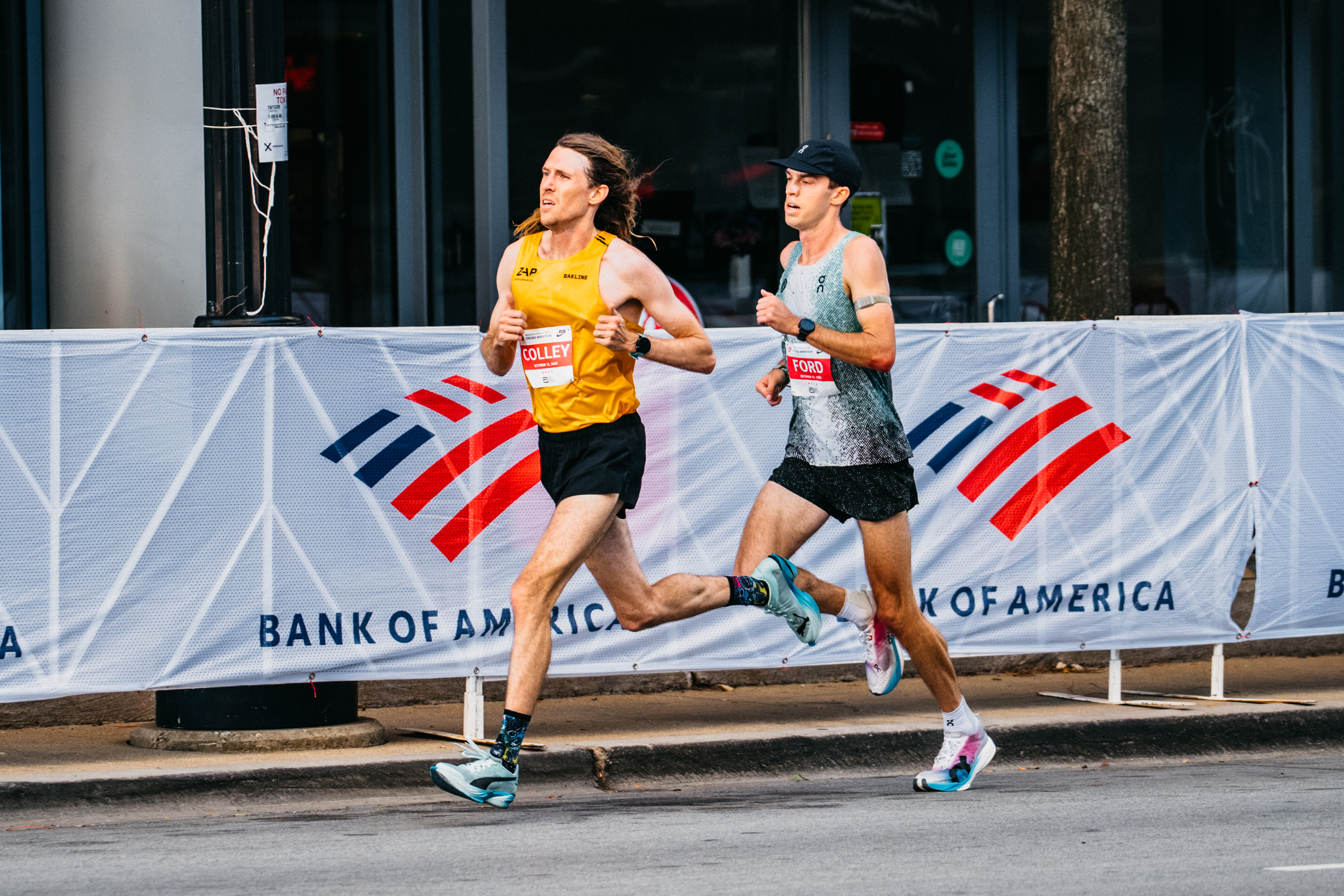
- Ford racing Andrew Colley at the 2025 Chicago Marathon

Personal information
- Born: Ryan Ford; 11 March 1998 (age 28) Huntsville, Alabama, U.S.
- Occupation: Long-distance runner
- Years active: 2021–present

Sport
- Country: United States
- Sport: Athletics
- Events: Marathon, Cross country, 10,000m
- Club: On Athletics Club (OAC)

Achievements and titles
- Personal bests: Marathon: 2:08:00 (2025); Half marathon: 59:48 (2026); 10,000m: 27:40.80 (2024); 5000m (outdoor): 13:30.68 (2024)

Ryan Ford (born 11 March 1998) is an American professional long-distance runner for the On Athletics Club. A former collegiate conference champion, he is best known for his top-10 finish at the 2025 Boston Marathon, where he established himself as one of America's elite marathoners.

== Career ==
=== Collegiate ===
Ford was a standout athlete for the University of Tennessee at Martin, where he was named the 2020-21 Ohio Valley Conference (OVC) Male Cross Country Athlete of the Year and won the OVC 5000m title on the track.

=== Professional ===
Ford joined the ZAP Endurance professional team in 2022. He made an impressive debut at the 2024 New York City Marathon, finishing as the top American in 11th place.

His breakout performance came at the 2025 Boston Marathon. Ford shattered his previous best, running 2:08:00 to finish 10th overall in a world-class field. The performance marked his arrival as a globally competitive marathoner and one of the top runners in the United States.

In late 2025, he left ZAP Endurance to join On Athletics Club (OAC). He trains out of Boulder, Colorado.

Ford placed 12th at the 2026 Boston Marathon. He was the fourth American finisher behind Zouhair Talbi, Charles Hicks, and Clayton Young. On 1 November 2026, Ford finished 10th overall and third for Americans at the New York City Marathon.

== Achievements ==
All information from World Athletics profile unless otherwise noted.

| Year | Competition | Venue | Position | Event | Notes |
|---|---|---|---|---|---|
| 2026 | New York City Marathon | New York City, U.S. | 10th | Marathon | 2:07:17 |
| 2026 | Boston Marathon | Boston, U.S. | 12th | Marathon | 2:05:46 |
| 2026 | Houston Half Marathon | Houston, U.S. | 6th | Half Marathon | 59:48 |
| 2025 | Chicago Marathon | Chicago, U.S. | 15th | Marathon | 2:09:37 |
| 2025 | Boston Marathon | Boston, U.S. | 10th | Marathon | 2:08:00 (PB) |
| 2025 | USATF Half Marathon Championships | Atlanta, U.S. | 7th | Half marathon | 1:01:29 |
| 2024 | New York City Marathon | New York City, U.S. | 11th | Marathon | 2:11:08 |
