= Motlatsi Maseela (athlete) =

Personal information
- Nationality: Lesotho
- Born: 1 October 1971 (age 54)

Sport
- Sport: Sprinting
- Event: 4 × 400 metres relay

Motlatsi Maseela (born 1 October 1971) is a Lesotho sprinter. He competed in the men's 4 × 400 metres relay at the 1996 Summer Olympics.
