= Makoekoe Mahanetsa =

Lesotho sprinter

Personal information
- Nationality: Lesotho
- Born: 14 February 1963 (age 63)

Sport
- Sport: Sprinting
- Event: 4 × 400 metres relay

Makoekoe Mahanetsa (born 14 February 1963) is a Lesotho sprinter. He competed in the men's 4 × 400 metres relay at the 1996 Summer Olympics.
