= M'Bam Diatigui Diarra =

Malian jurist (1946–2011)

M'Bam Diatigui Diarra (born October 2, 1946, in Dakar, Senegal and died on January 18, 2011, in Bamako, Mali) is a Malian lawyer and human rights activist, She served as Ombudsman of the Republic of Mali from 2009 until her death.

== Biography ==
M'Bam Diatigui Diarra held the chairmanship of the Malian Association for Human Rights between 1991 and 1998 and was involved at the international level as Special Rapporteur on the situation of human rights in Chad on behalf of the United Nations Centre for Human Rights between 1994 and 1996, coordinator of the Legal Aid Program at the Office of the High Commissioner for Human Rights in Burundi between 1997 and 1999, and coordinator of activities for the institutions of the Republic, political parties, women and civil society at the UN Office in Guinea-Bissau between 1999 and 2003. In Mali, she took part in the Reflection Committee on the Deepening of Democracy, chaired by Daba Diawara. On June 9, 2009, she was appointed Ombudsman of the Republic of Mali, a position she occupied until her death on January 18, 2011, following a traffic accident that occurred at around 11 pm in Dialakorobougou, 20 km from Bamako. At her funeral on the January 20, 2011, the president Amadou Toumani Touré posthumously conferred on M'Bam Diatigui Diarra the title of Commanders of the National Order in recognition of her fight for and defender of the poor and destitute.
