= LaMont Smith =

American athlete

Personal information
- Born: December 11, 1972 (age 53) Philadelphia, Pennsylvania, U.S.

Sport
- Country: United States
- Sport: Track
- Event: Sprints
- College team: Houston Cougars
- Club: Santa Monica Track Club

Achievements and titles
- Personal best: 400 m: 44.30 (Atlanta 1996)
Medal record
Men's athletics
Representing United States
Olympic Games
Gold medal – first place	1996 Atlanta	4 × 400 m relay

LaMont Smith (born December 11, 1972) is a former 1996 Olympic Games gold medalist in the men's 4 × 400 meter relay for the United States.

Raised in Willingboro Township, New Jersey, Smith is a graduate of Willingboro High School, the same school as Carl Lewis, who also won a gold medal at the same Olympics. While at Willingboro, Smith won nine state championships. He attended Blinn College, where he was a 4 time NJCAA national champion before transferring to the University of Houston. A decade younger than Lewis, Smith joined Lewis on the Santa Monica Track Club. Lamont became a member of Phi Beta Sigma fraternity in 1996.
