= Alfred Visagie =

South African sprinter

Personal information
- Nationality: South African
- Born: 17 September 1972 (age 53) Johannesburg, South Africa

Sport
- Sport: Sprinting
- Event: 200 metres

Alfred Visagie (born 17 September 1972) is a South African sprinter. He competed in the men's 200 metres and 4 × 400 m at the 1996 Summer Olympics.
