= Oumou Armand Diarra =

Malian writer

Oumou Armand Diarra is the pseudonym of Malian writer Oumou Modibo Sangare. She is the author of several articles about the struggle of women in Africa and Mali. She advocates social development while being consistent with the positive rules of the traditional and modern society of her country.

== Biography ==
Oumou was born in Belgrade in 1967 and educated in Mali, the Ivory Coast, where her father was Ambassador for Mali, and Tunisia. She enrolled at the Institut Bourguiba des Langues Vivantes in Tunis. In 1994 she graduated from this Institute with a Diploma in Chinese and Italian. In 1996, Oumou obtained a Masters in French literature, communication and cinema. During her study, she was the general secretary of the Mali Student Association in Tunisia. From 1991 to 1996 she was trained and worked at l'Office de la Radiodiffusion Télévision in Mali. Married with two children, Oumou now lives in New York. In 2014 and 2016 she helped organize the Biennial of Women's Letters in Bamako.

== Bibliography ==
- L’Afrique un Défi au Féminin (Africa a Challenge to the Feminine), Editions Casbah en Algérie, 1999.
- Tradition et Modernité dans Le Sang des Masques de Seydou Badian et dans L’honneur de la Tribu de Rachid Mimouni (Tradition and Modernity in The Blood of the Masks of Seydou Badian and in The Honor of the Tribe of Rachid Mimouni), Fondation littéraire Fleur de Lys, Canada, 2006
- Les Nouvelles du pays, miroir d’une société (The News of the country, mirror of a society), Editions Le Manuscrit, Paris 2006
- Plumes de Femme, une écriture en effervescence (Feathers of Woman, a writing in effervescence), Editions Le Manuscrit, Paris 2010.
- The Shadow of the Mysterious Nayouma, 2011.
