= Moussa Diarra =

Moussa Diarra may refer to:

- Moussa Diarra (footballer, born 1990), French football centre-back
- Moussa Diarra (footballer, born 2000), Malian football defender
- Moussa Diarra (footballer, born 2002), Malian football centre-back
