= Boubakary Diarra =

French footballer (born 1993)

Personal information
- Full name: Boubakary Diarra
- Date of birth: 30 August 1993 (age 33)
- Place of birth: Villepinte, France
- Height: 1.87 m (6 ft 2 in)
- Position: Defensive midfielder

Youth career
- Torino

Senior career*
Years	Team	Apps	(Gls)
2013–2015	Torino	0	(0)
2013–2014	→ Bra (loan)	17	(1)
2015	Kruoja Pakruojis	13	(0)
2015–2018	Covilhã	93	(4)
2018	Tondela	0	(0)
2018–2019	Rieti	17	(1)
2019–2020	Cova da Piedade	32	(3)
2020–2021	Varzim	16	(0)
2021	Kazma	0	(0)
2022–2023	Mosta	30	(1)
2023–2025	PSIS Semarang	57	(2)
2025	Sliema Wanderers	8	(0)
2026	Semen Padang	13	(0)

International career
2012–2013	Mali U20	2	(0)
- * Club domestic league appearances and goals as of 3 May 2026

Boubakary Diarra (born 30 August 1993) is a French professional footballer who plays as a defensive midfielder.

== Early life ==
Boubakary Diarra was born on 30 August 1993 in Villepinte, France.

== Club career ==
He made his professional debut in the Segunda Liga for Covilhã on 8 August 2016 in a game against Aves.

On 28 June 2018, he signed a two-year contract with Portuguese Primeira Liga side Tondela.

However, just two months later, and without playing any games for Tondela, he signed a two-year contract with Italian Serie C club Rieti on 28 August 2018. On 18 January 2019 he was released from his Rieti contract by mutual consent.

On 1 February 2019, he joined Portuguese second-tier club Cova da Piedade.

On 22 June 2022, Diarra joined Saudi Arabian club Hajer. On 22 August 2022, Diarra's contract with the club was canceled despite making no appearances.

In early 2023 season he plays for Mosta in Malta.

=== PSIS Semarang ===
On 10 June 2023, Diarra move to Indonesia and signed one-year contract with Liga 1 club PSIS Semarang. On 3 July 2023 Diarra scored a goal in his debut match against Bhayangkara at the Jatidiri Stadium, Semarang.

On 20 June 2024, PSIS Semarang officially extended Diarra's contract for the next two seasons.

== International ==
He represented Mali at the 2013 African U-20 Championship.
