= Cheikh-Alan Diarra =

French footballer (born 1993)

Personal information
- Date of birth: 23 June 1993 (age 33)
- Place of birth: Lyon, France
- Height: 1.85 m (6 ft 1 in)
- Position: Left winger

Team information
- Current team: Rumilly-Vallières
- Number: 11

Youth career
- 2002–2004: Majolaine Meyzieu
- 2002–2006: Lyon
- 2006–2008: Saint-Priest
- 2008–2011: Gueugnon
- 2011–2012: Dijon

Senior career*
Years	Team	Apps	(Gls)
2012–2015	Dijon II		
2015–2016	Petrolul Ploiești	0	(0)
2015	→ Oțelul Galați (loan)	10	(0)
2016–2017	Dinamo-Auto Tiraspol	11	(4)
2017	Dacia Chișinău	18	(6)
2018–2020	Zemplín Michalovce	40	(4)
2021–2022	Ain Sud	2	(1)
2022	Olympique Alès	12	(3)
2022–2023	Trélissac	30	(8)
2023–2024	Bourgoin-Jallieu	9	(0)
2024	Trélissac	8	(0)
2024–2025	Olympique Alès	25	(17)
2025–	Rumilly-Vallières	8	(2)
- * Club domestic league appearances and goals as of 14 February 2026

Cheikh-Alan Diarra (born 23 June 1993) is a French professional footballer who plays as a left winger for Championnat National 1 club Rumilly-Vallières.
