= Roger Gill (sprinter) =

Guyanese sprinter

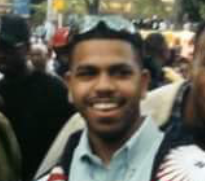
- Born: Roger Gill; May 23, 1972; Guyana
- Died: March 2, 2008 (aged 35); Brooklyn, New York, U.S.
- Education: Stony Brook University
- Spouse: Annette Hicks

Roger Gill (May 23, 1972 – March 2, 2008) was a Guyanese Olympic sprinter who competed in the 1996 Summer Olympics. Born to mother Margaret White, and father Richard Gill. Gill ran a leg in the 4x400-meter relay, Guyana finished sixth out of seven teams and failed to qualify past the first round.

Gill was a graduate of Stony Brook University, where he still holds the school outdoor records in the 100- and 200-meters as well as holding the marks indoors at 200- and 400-meters. Roger is the only S.B. freshman to earn All-American status.

Gill married Annette Hicks in 1997 and had six children.

Gill was killed in a car crash on March 2, 2008, in Brooklyn, New York, when the car he was riding in hit a box truck; the driver also died.
