= Tapha Diarra =

Senegalese sprinter

Personal information
- Nationality: Senegalese
- Born: 27 December 1970 (age 55)

Sport
- Sport: Sprinting
- Event: 4 × 400 metres relay

Moustafa "Tapha" Diarra (born 27 December 1970) is a Senegalese sprinter. He competed in the men's 4 × 400 metres relay at the 1996 Summer Olympics.
