= Mahamadou Diarra =

Malian footballer

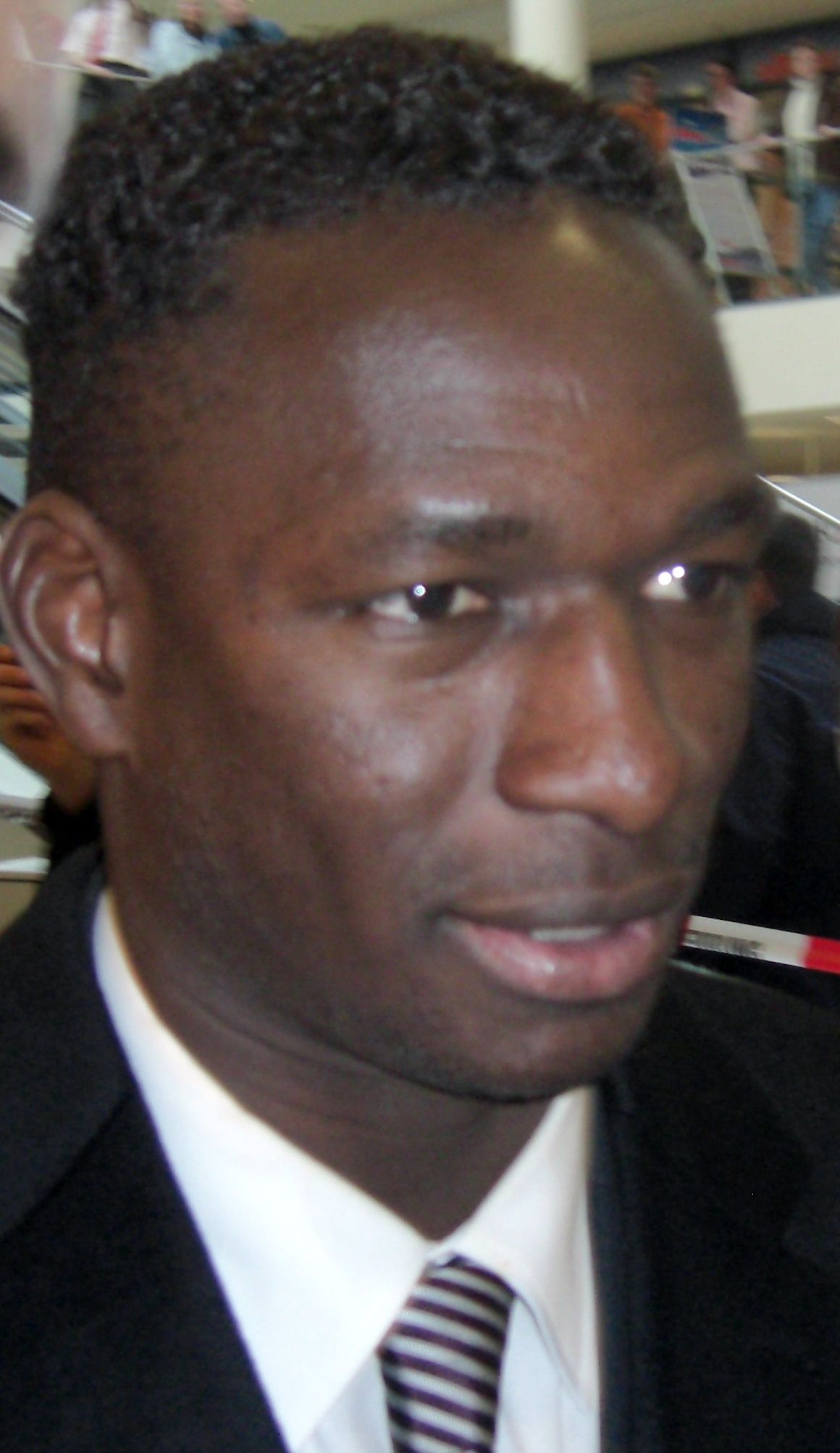
- Diarra in 2007

Personal information
- Date of birth: 18 May 1981 (age 45)
- Place of birth: Bamako, Mali
- Height: 1.82 m (6 ft 0 in)
- Position: Defensive midfielder

Youth career
- 1997–1998: Centre Salif Keita

Senior career*
Years	Team	Apps	(Gls)
1998–1999	OFI	21	(2)
1999–2002	Vitesse	69	(9)
2002–2006	Lyon	123	(7)
2006–2011	Real Madrid	90	(3)
2011	Monaco	9	(0)
2012–2014	Fulham	23	(1)
Total		335	(22)

International career
2000–2012	Mali	72	(7)
- * Club domestic league appearances and goals

Mahamadou Diarra (born 18 May 1981) is a Malian former professional footballer who played as a defensive midfielder. He served as captain for the Mali national team.

== Club career ==
=== OFI Crete ===
Diarra started his professional career at Greek club OFI at the age of 17, being signed after recommendation of his elder brother Harouna, who had joined the club a year earlier. After a single season at Greece and being watched by clubs such as Barcelona and Milan, he decided to join Dutch club Vitesse.

=== Vitesse ===
Diarra made his debut for Vitesse on 13 August 1999. During his tenure at the club, his playing style was compared to Ruud Gullit and attracted interest from Juventus, then coached by Carlo Ancelotti. During the summer of 2002, after receiving offers from many European clubs, Vitesse sold Diarra to Lyon by €4 million, although the player favoured a move to Ajax to rejoin his old manager Ronald Koeman. Diarra played a total of 69 league matches and scored nine times for the Arnhem-based club.

=== Lyon ===
At Lyon, Diarra was a starter in each of his four seasons, playing alongside Michael Essien and Juninho Pernambucano in the midfield and helping his side to win the Ligue 1 in each of those seasons.

=== Real Madrid ===
After Real Madrid head coach Fabio Capello asked club president Ramón Calderón to sign "three players", "Diarra, Diarra and Diarra", Real Madrid joined Manchester United in the race to sign the midfielder. Lyon said that Diarra could not leave and put a €40 million price tag on him. However, on 18 August 2006, Real Madrid agreed a fee of €26 million and four days later, Diarra was unveiled at the Santiago Bernabéu Stadium by Calderón and was assigned the number 6 shirt.

During the 2006–07 season, Diarra was a staple in Capello's two-defensive midfielder system. He appeared in 33 out of 38 La Liga matches, scoring on three occasions. On 18 June 2007, with Real Madrid needing to win against Mallorca to win the Liga for the first time since 2003, Diarra scored an 81st-minute header to give Madrid a 2–1 lead. In the 84th minute, José Antonio Reyes scored a third goal to ensure Real Madrid were champions.

Diarra played a pivotal role in the 2007–08 title defence under new head coach Bernd Schuster, and he established himself as the first-choice defensive midfielder, causing teammate Fernando Gago to play higher upfield. Real Madrid comfortably won the Liga, finishing eight points clear of second-placed Villarreal. Diarra had now been a league champion for six consecutive seasons, after winning Ligue 1 with Lyon between 2002–03 and 2005–06, and La Liga with Real Madrid in 2006–07 and 2007–08.

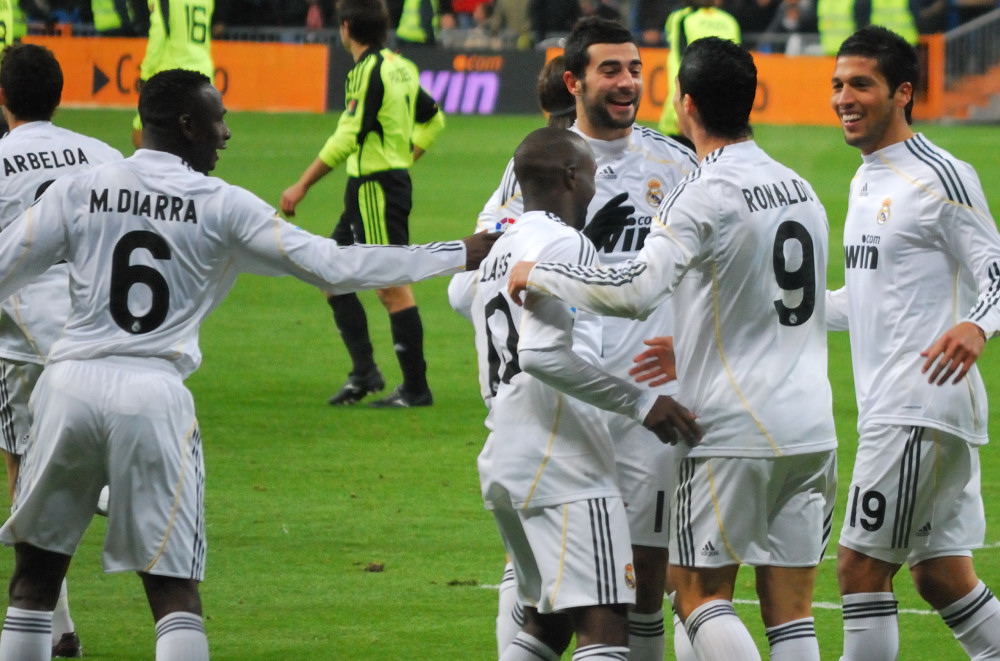
Diarra (left) with Real Madrid

In October 2008, while playing an international fixture for Mali against Chad, Diarra was stretchered off the field after receiving a blow to his knee. He was rested for a month and made his next appearance in late November, but was forced to undergo surgery after aggravating his knee injury, which ruled him out for the remainder of the 2008–09 season. In his absence, Real Madrid signed Lassana Diarra from Portsmouth as a replacement defensive midfielder, who was issued Diarra's number 6 shirt. After recovering from injury, Diarra only started 8 further matches in two seasons for Real Madrid. In January 2011, it was reported that Diarra would be leaving Real Madrid, and was linked to several clubs including Málaga.

=== Monaco ===
Diarra returned to French football after signing with Monaco on 27 January 2011. He made his debut in a 0–0 draw against Marseille. Diarra left Monaco after the club was relegated to Ligue 2 at the end of the 2010–11 season. After his departure, he remained without a club for the first half of the 2011–12 season and was linked with moves to the Middle East and English Championship club Doncaster Rovers.

=== Fulham ===
Diarra signed for Premier League side Fulham on 26 February 2012. He agreed to a contract for the remainder of the 2011–12 season, with an option for the 2012–13 season. He made his Fulham debut as a substitute against Wolverhampton Wanderers on 4 March, assisting the fifth goal in a 5–0 win. On 17 March, he made his first start for Fulham in a 3–0 home loss to Swansea City. He scored his first goal for Fulham against Bolton Wanderers on 7 April 2012.

After impressing manager Martin Jol throughout his 11 Premier League match, on 17 May, Diarra signed a new one-year contract at the club, keeping him at Craven Cottage until the end of the 2012–13 season.

Diarra was one of 12 players released by Fulham at the end of the 2012–13 season. Despite his release, Martin Jol remained positive on Diarra and vowed to help him over the summer to continue his rehabilitation.

Diarra re-signed for Fulham on 26 March 2014 on a contract that expired at the end of the 2013–14 season in an ultimately unsuccessful attempt to help the club survive relegation.

=== Later career ===
Diarra trained with Championship side Brentford throughout the 2016–17 season and made an appearance for the club's B team on 20 September 2016.

== Style of play ==
FourFourTwo magazine described Diarra's playing style with the following forwards in 2006: "Diarra provides aggression, tactical awareness, toughness and the discipline that other players simply lack."

== Personal life ==
Diarra is a practising Muslim. He observes fasting during the Islamic month of Ramadan, he maintains that "every coach has respected my decision".

== Career statistics ==
=== Club ===
Appearances and goals by club, season and competition
Club	Season	League			National cup (Note: Includes Greek Football Cup, KNVB Cup, Coupe de France, Copa del Rey)		League cup (Note: Includes Coupe de la Ligue)		Continental		Other		Total	
Club	Season	Division	Apps	Goals	Apps	Goals	Apps	Goals	Apps	Goals	Apps	Goals	Apps	Goals
OFI	1998–99	Alpha Ethniki	21	2	1	0	—		—		—		22	2
Vitesse	1999–2000	Eredivisie	16	2	1	0	—		1 (Note: Appearances in UEFA Cup)	0	—		18	2
Vitesse	2000–01	Eredivisie	29	4	3	0	—		2	0	—		34	4
Vitesse	2001–02	Eredivisie	24	3	4	0	—		—		—		28	3
Vitesse	Total		69	9	8	0	—		3	0	—		80	9
Lyon	2002–03	Ligue 1	28	1	2	0	1	0	7 (Note: Five appearances in UEFA Champions League and two in UEFA Cup)	0	1 (Note: Appearance in Trophée des Champions)	0	39	1
Lyon	2003–04	Ligue 1	27	1	0	0	0	0	10 (Note: Appearances in UEFA Champions League)	0	1	1	38	2
Lyon	2004–05	Ligue 1	33	2	1	0	3	1	9	2	—		46	5
Lyon	2005–06	Ligue 1	31	3	1	0	1	0	9	2	1	0	43	5
Lyon	2006–07	Ligue 1	4	0	—		—		—		—		4	0
Lyon	Total		123	7	4	0	5	1	35	4	3	1	170	13
Real Madrid	2006–07	La Liga	33	3	4	0	—		10	1	—		47	4
Real Madrid	2007–08	La Liga	30	0	0	0	—		6	0	2 (Note: Appearances in Supercopa de España)	0	38	0
Real Madrid	2008–09	La Liga	9	0	1	0	—		3	0	2	0	15	0
Real Madrid	2009–10	La Liga	15	0	2	0	—		3	0	—		20	0
Real Madrid	2010–11	La Liga	3	0	3	0	—		2	0	—		8	0
Real Madrid	Total		90	3	10	0	—		24	1	4	0	128	4
Monaco	2010–11	Ligue 1	9	0	—		—		—		—		9	0
Fulham	2011–12	Premier League	11	1	—		—		—		—		11	1
Fulham	2012–13	Premier League	8	0	0	0	0	0	—		—		8	0
Fulham	2013–14	Premier League	4	0	—		—		—		—		4	0
Fulham	Total		23	1	0	0	0	0	—		—		23	1
Career total			335	22	23	0	5	1	62	5	7	1	432	29

=== International ===
Appearances and goals by national team and year
National team	Year	Apps	Goals
Mali	1998	1	0
Mali	1999	1	0
Mali	2000	2	0
Mali	2001	3	0
Mali	2002	11	2
Mali	2003	8	0
Mali	2004	10	2
Mali	2005	3	1
Mali	2006	2	0
Mali	2007	7	1
Mali	2008	10	1
Mali	2009	3	0
Mali	2010	7	0
Mali	2011	3	0
Mali	2012	1	0
Total		72	7

Scores and results list Mali's goal tally first, score column indicates score after each Diarra goal.

List of international goals scored by Mahamadou Diarra
No.	Date	Venue	Opponent	Score	Result	Competition
1	6 January 2002	Ismailia Stadium, Ismailia, Egypt	Egypt	1–0	2–1	Friendly
2	6 January 2002	Ismailia Stadium, Ismailia, Egypt	Egypt	2–0	2–1	Friendly
3	30 January 2004	Stade El Menzah, Tunis, Tunisia	Burkina Faso	2–0	3–1	2004 African Cup of Nations
4	7 February 2004	Stade El Menzah, Tunis, Tunisia	Guinea	2–1	2–1	2004 African Cup of Nations
5	5 June 2005	Stade Amari Daou, Ségou, Mali	Liberia	4–1	4–1	2006 FIFA World Cup qualification
6	6 February 2007	Stade Marville, Saint-Malo, France	Lithuania	2–1	3–1	Friendly

== Honours ==
Lyon

- Ligue 1: 2002–03, 2003–04, 2004–05, 2005–06
- Trophée des Champions: 2002, 2003, 2004, 2005, 2006

Real Madrid

- La Liga: 2006–07, 2007–08
- Supercopa de España: 2008

Mali

- FIFA World Youth Championship third place: 1999

Individual

- UNFP Ligue 1 Team of the Year: 2005–06
