= Boubacar Diarra (footballer, born 1979) =

Malian footballer

Personal information
- Full name: Boubacar Diarra
- Date of birth: 15 July 1979 (age 47)
- Place of birth: Bamako, Mali
- Height: 1.84 m (6 ft 0 in)
- Position: Centre-back

Youth career
- –1996: Real Bamako

Senior career*
Years	Team	Apps	(Gls)
1996–1997	Djoliba AC	15	(1)
1997–2007	SC Freiburg	228	(2)
2007	1. FC Kaiserslautern	3	(0)
2007	1. FC Kaiserslautern II	5	(0)
2008–2010	FC Luzern	37	(0)
2010	Liaoning Hongyun	22	(0)
2011–2012	AS Bamako		

International career
1998–2004	Mali	22	(0)
- * Club domestic league appearances and goals

Boubacar Diarra (born 15 July 1979) is a Malian former professional footballer who played as central defender. Having started his senior career with Djoliba AC, he moved to Germany in 1997 joining SC Freiburg where he amassed over 200 league matches in a decade-long spell. He signed with 1. FC Kaiserslautern in 2007 but only spent half a season there. He went on to play for Swiss club FC Luzern and Liaoning Hongyun of China before returning to Mali with AS Bamako.

== Career ==
Born in Bamako, Diarra started his career at Djoliba AC.

In 1997, he moved to Europe joining German club SC Freiburg where he spent a decade. Following a short period with 1. FC Kaiserslautern, where his chance to play was limited by a broken arm, he joined Swiss club FC Luzern in 2008.

On 11 March 2010, Diarra left Lucerne and joined Chinese Super League club Liaoning Hongyun.

== Honours ==
Mali

- Africa Cup of Nations fourth place: 2002
