= Mohamadou Diarra =

Senegal international rugby union player

- Full name: Mohamadou Diarra
- Born: 1 January 1984 (age 42)
- Height: 171 cm (5 ft 7 in)
- Weight: 78 kg (172 lb; 12 st 4 lb)
- Notable relative: Ibrahim Diarra (half-brother)

Rugby union career
- Position: Winger
Senior career
Years	Team	Apps	(Points)
2005-2009	Section Paloise	35	(15)
2009-2011	USA Limoges	44	(95)
2011-2014	US Montauban	37	(55)
International career
Years	Team	Apps	(Points)
2005-2018	Senegal		

Mohamadou Diarra (born 26 September 1983) is a Senegalese rugby union player. He plays as a wing.

Diarra plays in France, where his first team was ES Viry Chatillon Rugby, from his debut, joining the first category in 2001/02, to 2003/04. He then would play for Section Paloise (2005/06-2008/09), the first season at Top 14, in one game, and the other three at Pro D2, Limoges (2009/10-2010/11) and US Montauban, since 2011/12, at Fédérale 1.

Diarra is an international player for Senegal. His half-brother Ibrahim played internationally for France.
