= Moustapha Diarra =

French basketball player

No. 13 – Paris Basketball
- Position: Center
- League: LNB Pro B

Personal information
- Born: 17 June 1987 (age 39) Marseille, France
- Listed height: 6 ft 9 in (2.06 m)
- Listed weight: 235 lb (107 kg)

Career information
- High school: Sheridan College (JC)
- College: San Francisco (2008–2011)
- NBA draft: 2011: undrafted
- Playing career: 2011–present

Career history
- 2011–2012: Pau-Orhtez
- 2012: Quimper
- 2012: Nantes
- 2012–2013: Rouen
- 2013–2014: ALM Évreux
- 2014–2016: BC Souffelweyersheim
- 2016–2017: Caen
- 2017–2018: Chartres Métropole
- 2018: Denain Voltaire
- 2018–present: Paris

Moustapha Diarra (born 17 June 1987) is a French basketball player. 6 ft 9 in (2.06 m) tall, Diarra plays as center. He has played for several teams in France during his career.
