= 1983 World Championships in Athletics – Men's 400 metres hurdles =

Men's 400 metres hurdles at the 1983 World Championships
- Venue: Helsinki Olympic Stadium
- Dates: 7 August (heats); 8 August (semi-finals); 9 August (final)
- Competitors: 34
- Winning time: 47.50 CR

Medalists
gold medal	Edwin Moses	United States
silver medal	Harald Schmid	West Germany
bronze medal	Aleksandr Kharlov	Soviet Union

These are the official results of the men's 400 metres hurdles event at the 1983 IAAF World Championships in Helsinki, Finland. There were a total number of 34 participating athletes, with five qualifying heats, two semi-finals and the final held on 9 August 1983.

== Medalists ==
Gold	Edwin Moses; United States (USA)
Silver	Harald Schmid; West Germany (FRG)
Bronze	Aleksandr Kharlov; Soviet Union (URS)

== Records ==
Existing records at the start of the event.

World Record	Edwin Moses (USA)	47.13	Milan, Italy	July 3, 1980
Championship Record	New event			

== Final ==
RANK	FINAL	TIME
	Edwin Moses (USA)	47.50
	Harald Schmid (FRG)	48.61
	Aleksandr Kharlov (URS)	49.03
4.	Sven Nylander (SWE)	49.06
5.	Andre Phillips (USA)	49.24
6.	David Lee (USA)	49.32
7.	Amadou Dia Ba (SEN)	49.61
8.	Ryszard Szparak (POL)	49.78

== Semi-finals ==
- Held on Monday 1983-08-08

RANK	HEAT 1	TIME
1.	Edwin Moses (USA)	48.11
2.	Andre Phillips (USA)	48.99
3.	Amadou Dia Ba (SEN)	49.18
4.	Aleksandr Kharlov (URS)	49.75
5.	Ahmed Hamada Jassim (BHR)	50.04
6.	Franz Meier (SUI)	50.31
7.	Rik Tommelein (BEL)	50.54
—	Toma Tomov (BUL)	DNF

RANK	HEAT 2	TIME
1.	Harald Schmid (FRG)	48.57
2.	David Lee (USA)	48.63
3.	Ryszard Szparak (POL)	49.17 NR
4.	Sven Nylander (SWE)	49.18
5.	Daniel Ogidi (NGR)	49.51
6.	José Alonso (ESP)	49.91
7.	Karl Smith (JAM)	49.99
8.	Krasimir Demirev (BUL)	50.91

== Qualifying heats ==
- Held on Sunday 1983-08-07

RANK	HEAT 1		TIME
1.	Andre Phillips	United States	50.44
2.	Rik Tommelein	Belgium	50.99
3.	Gary Oakes	Great Britain & N.I.	51.23
4.	Ian Newhouse	Canada	51.45
5.	Meshak Munyoro	Kenya	53.25
6.	Paiwa Bogela	Papua New Guinea	54.68
—	Aleksandr Yatsevich	Soviet Union	DNF

RANK	HEAT 2		TIME
1.	Aleksandr Kharlov	Soviet Union	50.12
2.	Sven Nylander	Sweden	50.23
3.	José Alonso	Spain	50.53
4.	Vladislav Pecen	Czechoslovakia	50.86
5.	István Takács	Hungary	50.97
6.	Peter Rwamuhanda	Uganda	50.99

RANK	HEAT 3		TIME
1.	David Lee	United States	50.15
3.	Toma Tomov	Bulgaria	50.39
3.	Karl Smith	Jamaica	50.64
4.	Thomas Futterknecht	Austria	50.68
5.	Antônio Dias Ferreira	Brazil	50.76
6.	Stephen Sole	Great Britain & N.I.	51.80
7.	Ahmed Abdelhalim Ghanem	Egypt	52.32

RANK	HEAT 4		TIME
1.	Edwin Moses	United States	49.54
2.	Daniel Ogidi	Nigeria	50.44
3.	Amadou Dia Ba	Senegal	50.59
4.	Krasimir Demirev	Bulgaria	50.62
5.	Greg Rolle	Bahamas	50.92
6.	Rok Kopitar	Yugoslavia	52.34
7.	Carlos Azulay	Spain	DSQ

RANK	HEAT 5		TIME
1.	Harald Schmid	West Germany	49.99
2.	Ryszard Szparak	Poland	50.09
3.	Franz Meier	Switzerland	50.09
4.	Ahmed Hamada Jassim	Bahrain	50.53
5.	Petter Hesselberg	Norway	51.67
6.	Georgios Vamvakas	Greece	51.92
7.	David Charlton	Bahamas	52.02

== See also ==
- 1980 Men's Olympic 400m Hurdles (Moscow)
- 1982 Men's European Championships 400m Hurdles (Athens)
- 1984 Men's Olympic 400m Hurdles (Los Angeles)
