= Athletics at the 1985 Summer Universiade – Men's 400 metres hurdles =

The men's 400 metres hurdles event at the 1985 Summer Universiade was held at the Kobe Universiade Memorial Stadium in Kobe on 29, 30, and 31 August 1985.

== Medalists ==
Gold	Silver	Bronze
Tagir Zemskov; Soviet Union	Henry Amike; Nigeria	René Djédjémel Mélédjé; Ivory Coast

== Results ==
=== Heats ===
Rank	Heat	Athlete	Nationality	Time	Notes
1	1	Tagir Zemskov	Soviet Union	49.97	Q
2	1	René Djédjémel Mélédjé	Ivory Coast	50.17	Q
3	5	Antônio Dias Ferreira	Brazil	50.27	Q
4	5	Thomas Futterknecht	Austria	50.31	Q
5	5	Dale Laverty	United States	50.31	Q
6	2	Martin Briggs	Great Britain	50.43	Q
7	1	Henry Amike	Nigeria	50.46	Q
7	4	Jon Thomas	United States	50.46	Q
9	4	Daniel Ogidi	Nigeria	50.53	Q
10	1	Julio Prado	Cuba	50.56	q
11	3	Fujihide Nakaiyo	Japan	50.62	Q
12	2	Toma Tomov	Bulgaria	50.63	Q
13	3	Aleksandr Kharlov	Soviet Union	50.67	Q
14	2	Franck Jonot	France	50.69	Q
15	4	István Takács	Hungary	50.76	Q
16	3	Pedro Chiamulera	Brazil	50.77	Q
17	4	Georgios Vamvakas	Greece	50.83	
18	2	Lloyd Guss	Canada	51.13	
19	3	John Graham	Canada	51.28	
20	1	Giorgio Rucli	Italy	51.29	
21	2	José Casabona	Spain	51.34	
22	1	Shigenori Omori	Japan	51.41	
23	1	István Simon-Balla	Hungary	51.48	
24	5	Thomas Wild	Switzerland	51.65	
25	4	Wilfredo Santiago	Puerto Rico	51.79	
26	5	Jung Han-joo	South Korea	52.13	
27	4	Tapio Kallio	Finland	52.17	
28	5	Javier Andrade	Puerto Rico	53.60	
29	2	Alex Ngeno	Kenya	54.76	
30	3	Mahmoud Abou Sarouil	Libya	57.13	
31	2	Yeung C.	Hong Kong	1:04.30	
	3	Markus König	West Germany	DNF	

=== Semifinals ===
Rank	Heat	Athlete	Nationality	Time	Notes
1	2	René Djédjémel Mélédjé	Ivory Coast	49.13	Q
2	1	Henry Amike	Nigeria	49.21	Q
3	2	Antônio Dias Ferreira	Brazil	49.24	Q, NR
4	1	Dale Laverty	United States	49.27	Q
5	1	Thomas Futterknecht	Austria	49.33	Q, NR
6	1	Tagir Zemskov	Soviet Union	49.33	q
7	2	Jon Thomas	United States	49.34	Q
8	1	Pedro Chiamulera	Brazil	49.65	q
9	2	Daniel Ogidi	Nigeria	49.69	
10	2	Aleksandr Kharlov	Soviet Union	49.73	
11	2	Martin Briggs	Great Britain	49.91	
12	1	Julio Prado	Cuba	50.27	
13	2	Fujihide Nakaiyo	Japan	50.87	
14	1	Toma Tomov	Bulgaria	51.47	
15	2	István Takács	Hungary	51.98	
16	1	Franck Jonot	France	52.27	

=== Final ===
Rank	Athlete	Nationality	Time	Notes
1st place, gold medalist(s)	Tagir Zemskov	Soviet Union	49.38	
2nd place, silver medalist(s)	Henry Amike	Nigeria	49.70	
3rd place, bronze medalist(s)	René Djédjémel Mélédjé	Ivory Coast	49.73	
4	Dale Laverty	United States	49.83	
5	Thomas Futterknecht	Austria	50.21	
6	Pedro Chiamulera	Brazil	50.54	
7	Jon Thomas	United States	50.95	
8	Antônio Dias Ferreira	Brazil	51.22	
