= 1987 World Championships in Athletics – Men's 400 metres hurdles =

These are the official results of the Men's 400 metres Hurdles event at the 1987 IAAF World Championships in Rome, Italy. There were a total number of 47 participating athletes, with six qualifying heats, two semi-finals and the final held on Tuesday 1987-09-01.

== Summary ==
After 122 consecutive victories, Edwin Moses's winning streak was finally broken in June by Danny Harris. Harris was in lane 5, while Moses was in lane three. Between them was Harald Schmid, the man who had last beaten Moses at the beginning of the streak. Surrounding them were the usual suspects of 1980's long hurdling.

From the gun, Moses took the race out hard, making up the stagger to catch Schmid just past the fourth hurdle. Harris was also out fast but not as aggressively as Moses, taking hurdles one stride behind. Running his famous 13 steps, Moses pulled away through the final turn as Schmid accelerated to keep pace. He had a two-metre lead coming of the 9th hurdle with Schmid passing Harris as Harris took the hurdle leaning back. Moses maintained his lead over the final hurdle as Harris fought back to a slight advantage against Schmid. But Moses was struggling to maintain his stride, Harris had the momentum and Schmid was responding to the challenge. The gap was disappearing as all three were fighting to get to the line. Moses dived for the line in desperation, Harris maintained form and Schmid gave a textbook lean reminiscent of Colin Jackson to try to get ahead. In the closest 400 metres hurdles race in World Championship history, Moses saved the victory in 47.46, while Harris and Schmid were given the same time of 47.48, with Harris getting the nod for silver.

After 11 years of chasing Moses, it was a European record and personal best for Schmid. Schmid's record would last almost 8 years and still ranks #16 on the all-time list. It was a World Championship record for Moses.

== Final ==
| RANK | LANE | FINAL | TIME |
|---|---|---|---|
| | 3 | Edwin Moses (USA) | 47.46 CR |
| | 5 | Danny Harris (USA) | 47.48 |
| | 4 | Harald Schmid (FRG) | 47.48 AR |
| 4. | 6 | Sven Nylander (SWE) | 48.37 |
| 5. | 2 | Amadou Dia Ba (SEN) | 48.37 |
| 6. | 1 | Henry Amike (NGR) | 48.63 |
| 7. | 7 | Kriss Akabusi (GBR) | 48.74 |
| 8. | 8 | José Alonso (ESP) | 49.46 |

== Semi-finals ==
- Held on Monday 1983-08-31

| RANK | HEAT 1 | TIME |
|---|---|---|
| 1. | Harald Schmid (FRG) | 48.23 |
| 2. | Danny Harris (USA) | 48.24 |
| 3. | Sven Nylander (SWE) | 48.46 |
| 4. | Henry Amike (NGR) | 48.50 NR |
| 5. | David Patrick (USA) | 48.56 |
| 6. | Winthrop Graham (JAM) | 48.64 |
| 7. | Shem Ochako (KEN) | 49.87 |
| 8. | Max Robertson (GBR) | 49.90 |

| RANK | HEAT 2 | TIME |
|---|---|---|
| 1. | Edwin Moses (USA) | 48.38 |
| 2. | Amadou Dia Ba (SEN) | 48.53 |
| 3. | Kriss Akabusi (GBR) | 48.64 |
| 4. | José Alonso (ESP) | 49.00 NR |
| 5. | Thomas Nyberg (SWE) | 49.03 |
| 6. | Toma Tomov (BUL) | 49.11 |
| 7. | Ryoichi Yoshida (JPN) | 49.39 |
| — | Aleksandr Vasilyev (URS) | DNF |

== Qualifying heats ==
- Held on Sunday 1987-08-30

| RANK | HEAT 1 | TIME |
|---|---|---|
| 1. | Edwin Moses (USA) | 49.03 |
| 2. | Henry Amike (NGR) | 49.56 |
| 3. | Ryoichi Yoshida (JPN) | 49.87 |
| 4. | Simon Kitur (KEN) | 50.30 |
| 5. | Martin Gillingham (GBR) | 50.64 |
| 6. | Michel Zimmerman (BEL) | 50.70 |
| 7. | Pedro Chiamulera (BRA) | 50.71 |
| – | Victor Lima Raimundo (STP) | DNS |

| RANK | HEAT 2 | TIME |
|---|---|---|
| 1. | Danny Harris (USA) | 48.74 |
| 2. | Max Robertson (GBR) | 49.73 |
| 3. | Shem Ochako (KEN) | 49.86 |
| 4. | Gilles Vimbert (FRA) | 50.34 |
| 5. | Thomas Futterknecht (AUT) | 50.44 |
| 6. | Pablo Squella (CHI) | 50.73 |
| 7. | Edgar Itt (FRG) | 51.18 |
| – | Prince Dowai (SLE) | DNS |

| RANK | HEAT 3 | TIME |
|---|---|---|
| 1. | Harald Schmid (FRG) | 49.28 |
| 2. | Kriss Akabusi (GBR) | 49.36 |
| 3. | Aleksandr Vasilyev (URS) | 49.99 |
| 4. | Joseph Maritim (KEN) | 50.04 |
| 5. | Angelo Locci (ITA) | 51.15 |
| 6. | Shigenobu Ohmori (JPN) | 51.20 |
| 7. | Rok Kopitar (YUG) | 51.53 |
| 8. | Ilan Goldwasser (ISR) | 52.54 |

| RANK | HEAT 4 | TIME |
|---|---|---|
| 1. | Sven Nylander (SWE) | 49.95 |
| 2. | Amadou Dia Ba (SEN) | 50.02 |
| 3. | Uwe Schmitt (FRG) | 50.54 |
| 4. | Rik Tommelein (BEL) | 50.63 |
| 5. | Jasem Goma'an Al-Duaillah (KUW) | 50.97 |
| 6. | Krasimir Demirev (BUL) | 51.07 |
| 7. | Jozef Kucej (TCH) | 51.13 |
| 8. | Wilfredo Ferrer (VEN) | 53.03 |

| RANK | HEAT 5 | TIME |
|---|---|---|
| 1. | Toma Tomov (BUL) | 49.27 |
| 2. | Winthrop Graham (JAM) | 49.34 |
| 3. | José Alonso (ESP) | 49.42 |
| 4. | Randy Cox (TRI) | 50.14 |
| 5. | Philippe Gonigam (FRA) | 50.38 |
| 6. | Daniel Ogidi (NGR) | 50.51 |
| 7. | Klaus Ehrle (AUT) | 50.91 |
| 8. | Ahmed Abdelhalim Ghanem (EGY) | 51.35 |

| RANK | HEAT 6 | TIME |
|---|---|---|
| 1. | Thomas Nyberg (SWE) | 50.06 |
| 2. | David Patrick (USA) | 50.10 |
| 3. | John Graham (CAN) | 50.23 |
| 4. | Greg Rolle (BAH) | 50.63 |
| 5. | Stanislav Navesnak (TCH) | 50.65 |
| 6. | Athanasios Kalogiannis (GRE) | 51.94 |
| 7. | Ken Gordon (AUS) | 52.22 |
