= Athletics at the 1984 Summer Olympics – Men's 400 metres hurdles =

Men's 400 metres hurdles at the Games of the XXIII Olympiad
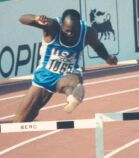
- Edwin Moses (1987)
- Venue: Los Angeles Memorial Coliseum
- Dates: 3 August 1984 (quarterfinals); 4 August 1984 (semifinals); 5 August 1984 (final)
- Competitors: 45 from 30 nations
- Winning time: 47.75

Medalists
1st place, gold medalist(s)		Edwin Moses; United States
2nd place, silver medalist(s)		Danny Harris; United States
3rd place, bronze medalist(s)		Harald Schmid; West Germany

Official Video Highlights

The men's 400 metres hurdles at the 1984 Summer Olympics in Los Angeles, California had an entry list of 45 competitors from 30 nations, with six qualifying heats (45 runners) and two semifinals (16) before the final (8) took place on Sunday August 5, 1984. The maximum number of athletes per nation had been set at 3 since the 1930 Olympic Congress. American Edwin Moses won his second Olympic gold medal after 1976, while his 18-year-old teammate Danny Harris took the silver medal. Moses' gold was the United States' 13th victory in the event. He became the sixth man to win multiple medals in the event, and the second to win multiple golds. Harald Schmid of West Germany took bronze, giving the nation its first medal in the 400 metres hurdles since 1968.

== Background ==
This was the 18th time the event was held. It had been introduced along with the men's 200 metres hurdles in 1900, with the 200 being dropped after 1904 and the 400 being held through 1908 before being left off the 1912 programme. However, when the Olympics returned in 1920 after World War I, the men's 400 metres hurdles was back and would continue to be contested at every Games thereafter.

One of the eight finalists from the 1980 Games returned: seventh-place finisher Franz Meier of Switzerland. Also returning was 1976 gold medalist Edwin Moses of the United States, who had not competed in 1980 due to the American-led boycott. Moses had not lost a 400 metres hurdles race since 26 August, 1977; he had won 89 consecutive finals since then, including the inaugural 1983 World Championship. There was little expectation that anyone would challenge Moses, but if anyone could it was thought to be Harald Schmid of West Germany—the winner in Moses's last loss seven years earlier, the runner-up at the World Championship, and the 1978 and 1982 European champion. Moses' teenage teammate Danny Harris was also an up-and-coming contender.

The Bahamas, Bahrain, Cameroon, Egypt, the Ivory Coast, Jamaica, Mozambique, Paraguay, Rwanda, the Seychelles, and the United Arab Emirates each made their debut in the event. The United States made its 17th appearance, most of any nation, having missed only the boycotted 1980 Games.

== Competition format ==
The competition used the three-round format used every Games since 1908 (except the four-round competition in 1952): quarterfinals, semifinals, and a final. Ten sets of hurdles were set on the course. The hurdles were 3 feet (91.5 centimetres) tall and were placed 35 metres apart beginning 45 metres from the starting line, resulting in a 40 metres home stretch after the last hurdle. The 400 metres track was standard.

There were 6 quarterfinal heats with between 6 and 8 athletes each. The top 2 men in each quarterfinal advanced to the semifinals along with the next fastest 4 overall. The 16 semifinalists were divided into 2 semifinals of 8 athletes each, with the top 4 in each semifinal advancing to the 8-man final.

== Records ==
These were the standing world and Olympic records (in seconds) prior to the 1984 Summer Olympics.

World record	Edwin Moses (USA)	47.02	Koblenz, West Germany	31 August 1983
Olympic record	Edwin Moses (USA)	47.64	Montreal, Canada	25 July 1976

No new world or Olympic records were set during the competition.

== Schedule ==
All times are Pacific Daylight Time (UTC-7)

Date	Time	Round
Friday, 3 August 1984	11:20	Quarterfinals
Saturday, 4 August 1984	18:25	Semifinals
Sunday, 5 August 1984	18:55	Final

== Results ==
=== Quarterfinals ===
The quarterfinals were held on Friday August 3, 1984.

==== Quarterfinal 1 ====
Rank	Athlete	Nation	Time	Notes
1	Edwin Moses	United States	49.33	Q
2	Antônio Dias Ferreira	Brazil	49.85	Q
3	Michel Zimmermann	Belgium	49.90	q
4	Thomas Futterknecht	Austria	50.25	
5	Thomas Nyberg	Sweden	50.47	
6	Gérard Brunel	France	50.99	
7	Ahmed Ghanem	Egypt	51.08	
8	Phil Beattie	Great Britain	51.27	

==== Quarterfinal 2 ====
Rank	Athlete	Nation	Time	Notes
1	Harald Schmid	West Germany	49.34	Q
2	Karl Smith	Jamaica	49.66	Q
3	Franz Meier	Switzerland	49.81	q
4	Rik Tommelein	Belgium	50.05	q
5	Shigenori Omori	Japan	50.14	
6	Yeoryiós Vamvakas	Greece	50.39	
7	Oswaldo Zea	Venezuela	51.44	

==== Quarterfinal 3 ====
Rank	Athlete	Nation	Time	Notes
1	Sven Nylander	Sweden	49.88	Q
2	Ryoichi Yoshida	Japan	50.24	Q
3	René Djédjémél	Ivory Coast	50.27	
4	Peter Rwamuhanda	Uganda	50.55	
5	Franck Jonot	France	51.39	
6	Martin Gillingham	Great Britain	52.15	
7	Vincent Confait	Seychelles	53.62	
8	Nicolás Chaparro	Paraguay	56.98	

==== Quarterfinal 4 ====
Rank	Athlete	Nation	Time	Notes
1	Tranel Hawkins	United States	49.51	Q
2	Simon Kitur	Kenya	49.70	Q
3	Uwe Schmitt	West Germany	49.77	q
4	Ahmed Hamada Jassim	Bahrain	50.62	
5	Ian Newhouse	Canada	51.14	
6	Christer Gullstrand	Sweden	51.27	
7	Jean-Pierre Abossolo-Ze	Cameroon	52.85	
8	Domingos Mendes	Mozambique	54.52	

==== Quarterfinal 5 ====
Rank	Athlete	Nation	Time	Notes
1	Amadou Dia Bâ	Senegal	49.94	Q
2	Henry Amike	Nigeria	50.11	Q
3	Ken Gray	Jamaica	50.46	
4	Martin Briggs	Great Britain	50.80	
5	Pierre Leveille	Canada	51.47	
6	Meshak Munyoro	Kenya	51.99	
7	Faustin Butéra	Rwanda	54.36	
8	Ibrahim Khamis	United Arab Emirates	55.50	

==== Quarterfinal 6 ====
Rank	Athlete	Nation	Time	Notes
1	Danny Harris	United States	49.81	Q
2	Greg Rolle	Bahamas	50.41	Q
3	Lloyd Guss	Canada	51.02	
4	Athanassios Kalogiannis	Greece	50.62	
5	Jasem Al-Dowaila	Kuwait	51.45	
—	José Alonso	Spain	DNF	

=== Semifinals ===
The semifinals were held on Saturday August 4, 1984.

==== Semifinal 1 ====
Rank	Athlete	Nation	Time	Notes
1	Edwin Moses	United States	48.51	Q
2	Tranel Hawkins	United States	48.94	Q
3	Amadou Dia Bâ	Senegal	49.44	Q
4	Michel Zimmermann	Belgium	49.79	Q
5	Simon Kitur	Kenya	49.80	
6	Uwe Schmitt	West Germany	50.08	
7	Greg Rolle	Bahamas	50.16	
8	Antônio Dias Ferreira	Brazil	50.70	

==== Semifinal 2 ====
Rank	Athlete	Nation	Time	Notes
1	Danny Harris	United States	48.92	Q
2	Sven Nylander	Sweden	49.03	Q
3	Harald Schmid	West Germany	49.04	Q
4	Henry Amike	Nigeria	49.36	Q
5	Karl Smith	Jamaica	49.58	
6	Franz Meier	Switzerland	49.89	
7	Ryoichi Yoshida	Japan	49.92	
8	Rik Tommelein	Belgium	50.06	

=== Final ===
Rank	Lane	Athlete	Nation	Time
1st place, gold medalist(s)	6	Edwin Moses	United States	47.75
2nd place, silver medalist(s)	4	Danny Harris	United States	48.13
3rd place, bronze medalist(s)	5	Harald Schmid	West Germany	48.19
4	3	Sven Nylander	Sweden	48.97
5	7	Amadou Dia Bâ	Senegal	49.28
6	1	Tranel Hawkins	United States	49.42
7	8	Michel Zimmermann	Belgium	50.69
8	2	Henry Amike	Nigeria	53.78

== Results summary ==
Rank	Athlete	Nation	Quarterfinals	Semifinals	Final
1st place, gold medalist(s)	Edwin Moses	United States	49.33	48.51	47.75
2nd place, silver medalist(s)	Danny Harris	United States	49.81	48.92	48.13
3rd place, bronze medalist(s)	Harald Schmid	West Germany	49.34	49.04	48.19
4	Sven Nylander	Sweden	49.88	49.03	48.97
5	Amadou Dia Bâ	Senegal	49.94	49.44	49.28
6	Tranel Hawkins	United States	49.51	48.94	49.42
7	Michel Zimmermann	Belgium	49.90	49.79	50.69
8	Henry Amike	Nigeria	50.11	49.36	53.78
9	Karl Smith	Jamaica	49.66	49.58	Did not advance
10	Simon Kitur	Kenya	49.70	49.80	Did not advance
11	Franz Meier	Switzerland	49.81	49.89	Did not advance
12	Ryoichi Yoshida	Japan	50.24	49.92	Did not advance
13	Rik Tommelein	Belgium	50.05	50.06	Did not advance
14	Uwe Schmitt	West Germany	49.77	50.08	Did not advance
15	Greg Rolle	Bahamas	50.41	50.16	Did not advance
16	Antônio Dias Ferreira	Brazil	49.85	50.70	Did not advance
17	Shigenori Omori	Japan	50.14	Did not advance	
18	Thomas Futterknecht	Austria	50.25	Did not advance	
19	René Djédjémél	Ivory Coast	50.27	Did not advance	
20	Yeoryiós Vamvakas	Greece	50.39	Did not advance	
21	Ken Gray	Jamaica	50.46	Did not advance	
22	Thomas Nyberg	Sweden	50.47	Did not advance	
23	Peter Rwamuhanda	Uganda	50.55	Did not advance	
24	Ahmed Hamada Jassim	Bahrain	50.62	Did not advance	
24	Athanasios Kalogiannis	Greece	50.62	Did not advance	
26	Martin Briggs	Great Britain	50.80	Did not advance	
27	Gérard Brunel	France	50.99	Did not advance	
28	Lloyd Guss	Canada	51.02	Did not advance	
29	Ahmed Ghanem	Egypt	51.08	Did not advance	
30	Ian Newhouse	Canada	51.14	Did not advance	
31	Phil Beattie	Great Britain	51.27	Did not advance	
31	Christer Gullstrand	Sweden	51.27	Did not advance	
33	Franck Jonot	France	51.39	Did not advance	
34	Oswaldo Zea	Venezuela	51.44	Did not advance	
35	Jasem Al-Dowaila	Kuwait	51.45	Did not advance	
36	Pierre Leveille	Canada	51.47	Did not advance	
37	Meshak Munyoro	Kenya	51.99	Did not advance	
38	Martin Gillingham	Great Britain	52.15	Did not advance	
39	Jean-Pierre Abossolo-Ze	Cameroon	52.85	Did not advance	
40	Vincent Confait	Seychelles	53.62	Did not advance	
41	Faustin Butéra	Rwanda	54.36	Did not advance	
42	Domingos Mendes	Mozambique	54.52	Did not advance	
43	Ibrahim Khamis	United Arab Emirates	55.50	Did not advance	
44	Nicolás Chaparro	Paraguay	56.98	Did not advance	
45	José Alonso	Spain	DNF	Did not advance	

== See also ==
- Athletics at the Friendship Games – Men's 400 metres hurdles
