= Athletics at the 1983 Summer Universiade – Men's 400 metres hurdles =

The men's 400 metres hurdles event at the 1983 Summer Universiade was held at the Commonwealth Stadium in Edmonton, Canada on 7, 8 and 9 July 1983.

== Medalists ==
Gold	Silver	Bronze
Aleksandr Kharlov; Soviet Union	Amadou Dia Ba; Senegal	David Patrick; United States

== Results ==
=== Heats ===
Rank	Heat	Athlete	Nationality	Time	Notes
1	1	Aleksandr Kharlov	Soviet Union	50.25	Q
2	1	Thomas Wild	Switzerland	50.40	Q
3	4	Amadou Dia Ba	Senegal	50.68	Q
4	1	Lloyd Guss	Canada	50.75	Q
5	4	Carlos Azulay	Spain	50.83	Q
6	4	David Patrick	United States	50.96	Q
7	3	Georgios Vamvakas	Greece	51.00	Q
8	3	Dmitry Shkarupin	Soviet Union	51.10	Q
9	1	Riccardo Trevisan	Italy	51.22	q
10	1	Rafael Casabona	Spain	51.23	q
11	4	Carlos Leal	Mexico	51.24	q
12	4	Ian Newhouse	Canada	51.24	q
13	3	Axel Salander	West Germany	51.31	Q
14	3	Vinicio Ruggieri	Italy	51.33	
15	2	Daniel Ogidi	Nigeria	51.34	Q
16	2	Julius Mercer	United States	51.39	Q
17	2	Shigenori Omori	Japan	51.48	Q
18	1	Uwe Schmitt	West Germany	51.76	
19	2	Antonio Ferreira	Brazil	52.00	
20	2	Tapio Kallio	Finland	52.56	
21	4	Khalid Rgoug	Morocco	52.76	
22	3	Alphonse Mandonda	Congo	53.32	
23	2	Gualberto Paquete	Angola	55.65	

=== Semifinals ===
Rank	Heat	Athlete	Nationality	Time	Notes
1	1	Amadou Dia Ba	Senegal	50.15	Q
2	2	Aleksandr Kharlov	Soviet Union	50.22	Q
3	1	Dmitry Shkarupin	Soviet Union	50.23	Q
4	1	David Patrick	United States	50.27	Q
5	2	Julius Mercer	United States	50.48	Q
6	2	Carlos Azulay	Spain	50.58	Q
7	2	Axel Salander	West Germany	50.63	q
8	1	Shigenori Omori	Japan	50.71	q
9	1	Thomas Wild	Switzerland	50.74	
10	2	Riccardo Trevisan	Italy	50.76	
11	2	Georgios Vamvakas	Greece	50.78	
12	2	Lloyd Guss	Canada	50.83	
13	1	Ian Newhouse	Canada	51.28	
14	1	Rafael Casabona	Spain	51.46	
15	2	Carlos Leal	Mexico	51.77	
	1	Daniel Ogidi	Nigeria	DQ	

=== Final ===
Rank	Athlete	Nationality	Time	Notes
1st place, gold medalist(s)	Aleksandr Kharlov	Soviet Union	49.41	
2nd place, silver medalist(s)	Amadou Dia Ba	Senegal	49.94	
3rd place, bronze medalist(s)	David Patrick	United States	50.28	
4	Rafael Azulay	Spain	51.07	
5	Dmitry Shkarupin	Soviet Union	51.31	
6	Julius Mercer	United States	52.31	
7	Axel Salander	West Germany	53.53	
	Shigenori Omori	Japan	DNF	
