= Athletics at the 1987 Summer Universiade – Men's 400 metres hurdles =

The men's 400 metres hurdles event at the 1987 Summer Universiade was held at the Stadion Maksimir in Zagreb on 16, 17 and 19 July 1987.

== Medalists ==
| Gold | Silver | Bronze |
|---|---|---|
| Dave Patrick; United States | Athanasios Kalogiannis; Greece | Ryoichi Yoshida; Japan |

== Results ==
=== Heats ===
| Rank | Heat | Athlete | Nationality | Time | Notes |
|---|---|---|---|---|---|
| 1 | 3 | Ryoichi Yoshida | Japan | 49.96 | Q |
| 2 | 3 | Jozef Kucej | Czechoslovakia | 50.33 | Q |
| 3 | 3 | Henry Amike | Nigeria | 50.36 | q |
| 4 | 2 | Tagir Zemskov | Soviet Union | 50.41 | Q |
| 5 | 2 | Athanasios Kalogiannis | Greece | 50.50 | Q |
| 6 | 1 | Dave Patrick | United States | 50.56 | Q |
| 6 | 4 | Pablo Squella | Chile | 50.56 | Q |
| 8 | 1 | Aleksey Bazarov | Soviet Union | 50.62 | Q |
| 9 | 3 | Rok Kopitar | Yugoslavia | 50.69 | q |
| 10 | 1 | Thomas Futterknecht | Austria | 50.72 | q |
| 11 | 2 | Uwe Ackermann | East Germany | 50.79 | q |
| 12 | 4 | Daniel Ogidi | Nigeria | 50.92 | Q |
| 13 | 2 | Jesús Ariño | Spain | 51.07 | q |
| 14 | 2 | Ngeno Kirono | Kenya | 51.20 | q |
| 15 | 5 | Angelo Locci | Italy | 51.38 | Q |
| 16 | 2 | István Takács | Hungary | 51.53 | |
| 17 | 5 | Branislav Karaulić | Yugoslavia | 51.58 | Q |
| 18 | 2 | Pierre Leveille | Canada | 51.71 | |
| 19 | 4 | Hamidou M'Baye | Senegal | 51.73 | |
| 20 | 5 | Abdelhaq Touhama | Morocco | 52.24 | |
| 21 | 1 | Ousmane Diarra | Senegal | 52.29 | |
| 22 | 3 | Ilan Goldwasser | Israel | 52.39 | |
| 23 | 1 | Mohamed Moumni | Morocco | 52.40 | |
| 24 | 2 | Efrain Williams | Puerto Rico | 52.47 | |
| 25 | 4 | Domingo Cordero | Puerto Rico | 52.70 | |
| 26 | 1 | Alberto Izu | Peru | 52.98 | |
| 27 | 4 | Neville Douglas | Canada | 53.47 | |
| 28 | 3 | Judex Lefou | Mauritius | 54.70 | |
| 29 | 5 | Javier del Río | Peru | 54.89 | |
| 30 | 5 | Fikret Tulumtaş | Turkey | 55.33 | |
| 31 | 3 | Charalambos Papadopoulos | Cyprus | 55.88 | |
| 32 | 5 | Arnoldo Monge | Costa Rica | 57.45 | |
| | 4 | Hiroshi Kakimori | Japan | DNF | |
| | 3 | Dolph Francis | Australia | DNS | |

=== Semifinals ===
| Rank | Heat | Athlete | Nationality | Time | Notes |
|---|---|---|---|---|---|
| 1 | 1 | Daniel Ogidi | Nigeria | 49.85 | Q |
| 2 | 1 | Dave Patrick | United States | 49.86 | Q |
| 3 | 1 | Thomas Futterknecht | Austria | 49.88 | Q |
| 4 | 1 | Aleksey Bazarov | Soviet Union | 50.17 | Q |
| 5 | 1 | Jozef Kucej | Czechoslovakia | 50.23 | |
| 6 | 1 | Jesús Ariño | Spain | 50.76 | |
| 7 | 1 | Branislav Karaulić | Yugoslavia | 51.06 | |
| 1 | 2 | Henry Amike | Nigeria | 49.38 | Q |
| 2 | 2 | Ryoichi Yoshida | Japan | 49.50 | Q |
| 3 | 2 | Rok Kopitar | Yugoslavia | 49.77 | Q |
| 4 | 2 | Athanasios Kalogiannis | Greece | 49.78 | Q |
| 5 | 2 | Tagir Zemskov | Soviet Union | 50.05 | |
| 6 | 2 | Angelo Locci | Italy | 50.18 | |
| 7 | 2 | Ngeno Kirono | Kenya | 52.85 | |
| | ? | Pablo Squella | Chile | ? | |

=== Final ===
| Rank | Lane | Athlete | Nationality | Time | Notes |
|---|---|---|---|---|---|
| 1st place, gold medalist(s) | 2 | Dave Patrick | United States | 48.75 | |
| 2nd place, silver medalist(s) | 6 | Athanasios Kalogiannis | Greece | 48.80 | NR |
| 3rd place, bronze medalist(s) | 5 | Ryoichi Yoshida | Japan | 49.20 | |
| 4 | 7 | Daniel Ogidi | Nigeria | 49.74 | |
| 5 | 1 | Aleksey Bazarov | Soviet Union | 49.76 | |
| 6 | 8 | Thomas Futterknecht | Austria | 50.24 | |
| 7 | 3 | Rok Kopitar | Yugoslavia | 50.74 | |
| | 4 | Henry Amike | Nigeria | DNS | |
