= 1982 European Athletics Championships – Men's 400 metres hurdles =

Men's 400 metres hurdles at the European Athletics Championships

These are the official results of the Men's 400 metres hurdles event at the 1982 European Championships in Athens, Greece, held at Olympic Stadium "Spiros Louis" on 6, 7, and 8 September 1982.

== Medalists ==
Gold	Harald Schmid; West Germany
Silver	Aleksandr Yatsevich; Soviet Union
Bronze	Uwe Ackermann; East Germany

== Results ==
=== Final ===
8 September

Rank	Name	Nationality	Time	Notes
1st place, gold medalist(s)	Harald Schmid	West Germany	47.48	AR
2nd place, silver medalist(s)	Aleksandr Yatsevich	Soviet Union	48.60	
3rd place, bronze medalist(s)	Uwe Ackermann	East Germany	48.64	
4	Vasiliy Arkhipenko	Soviet Union	48.68	
5	Ryszard Szparak	Poland	49.41	
6	Aleksandr Kharlov	Soviet Union	49.56	
7	Sven Nylander	Sweden	49.64	
8	Toma Tomov	Bulgaria	50.10	

=== Semi-finals ===
7 September

==== Semi-final 1 ====
Rank	Name	Nationality	Time	Notes
1	Harald Schmid	West Germany	49.84	Q
2	Vasiliy Arkhipenko	Soviet Union	49.98	Q
3	Sven Nylander	Sweden	50.03	Q
4	Toma Tomov	Bulgaria	50.10	Q
5	Franz Meier	Switzerland	50.33	
6	Michael Zimmerman	Belgium	50.83	
7	Georgios Vamvakas	Greece	50.85	
8	José Alonso	Spain	51.00	

==== Semi-final 2 ====
Rank	Name	Nationality	Time	Notes
1	Uwe Ackermann	East Germany	49.32	Q
2	Aleksandr Yatsevich	Soviet Union	49.55	Q
3	Ryszard Szparak	Poland	49.79	Q
4	Aleksandr Kharlov	Soviet Union	50.00	Q
5	Serge Guillen	France	50.40	
6	Saverio Gellini	Italy	50.59	
7	Christer Gullstrand	Sweden	50.61	
8	Krasimir Demirev	Bulgaria	51.45	

=== Heats ===
6 September

==== Heat 1 ====
Rank	Name	Nationality	Time	Notes
1	Harald Schmid	West Germany	49.27	Q
2	Serge Guillen	France	50.07	Q
3	Vasiliy Arkhipenko	Soviet Union	50.10	Q
4	Toma Tomov	Bulgaria	50.36	Q
5	Georgios Vamvakas	Greece	50.84	q
6	Marceliano Ruiz	Spain	51.10	
7	José Carvalho	Portugal	51.35	
8	István Simon-Balla	Hungary	51.61	

==== Heat 2 ====
Rank	Name	Nationality	Time	Notes
1	Uwe Ackermann	East Germany	49.48	Q
2	Aleksandr Kharlov	Soviet Union	50.52	Q
3	Franz Meier	Switzerland	50.68	Q
4	Michael Zimmerman	Belgium	50.71	Q
5	Christer Gullstrand	Sweden	50.75	q
6	Krasimir Demirev	Bulgaria	50.89	q
7	José Alonso	Spain	50.95	q

==== Heat 3 ====
Rank	Name	Nationality	Time	Notes
1	Ryszard Szparak	Poland	50.51	Q
2	Aleksandr Yatsevich	Soviet Union	50.83	Q
3	Saverio Gellini	Italy	51.27	Q
4	Sven Nylander	Sweden	51.40	Q
5	Horia Toboc	Romania	51.65	
6	Olivier Gui	France	52.39	

== Participation ==
According to an unofficial count, 21 athletes from 15 countries participated in the event.

- Belgium (1)
- Bulgaria (2)
- East Germany (1)
- France (2)
- Greece (1)
- Hungary (1)
- Italy (1)
- Poland (1)
- Portugal (1)
- Romania (1)
- Soviet Union (3)
- Spain (2)
- Sweden (2)
- Switzerland (1)
- West Germany (1)

== See also ==
- 1978 Men's European Championships 400m Hurdles (Prague)
- 1980 Men's Olympic 400m Hurdles (Moscow)
- 1983 Men's World Championships 400m Hurdles (Helsinki)
- 1984 Men's Olympic 400m Hurdles (Moscow)
- 1986 Men's European Championships 400m Hurdles (Stuttgart)
- 1987 Men's World Championships 400m Hurdles (Rome)
- 1988 Men's Olympic 400m Hurdles (Seoul)
