= Athletics at the 1988 Summer Olympics – Men's 400 metres hurdles =

Men's 400 metres hurdles at the Games of the XXIV Olympiad
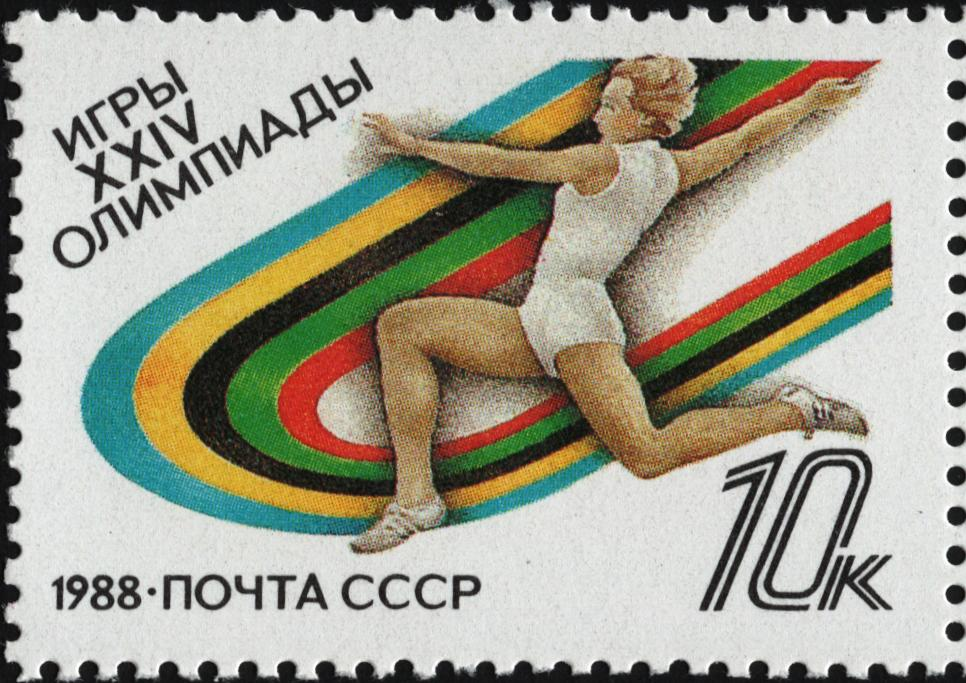
- Soviet stamp commemorating 1988 Olympic athletics
- Venue: Olympic Stadium
- Dates: 23 September 1988 (quarterfinals); 24 September 1988 (semifinals); 25 September 1988 (final)
- Competitors: 38 from 28 nations
- Winning time: 47.19 OR

Medalists
1st place, gold medalist(s)		Andre Phillips; United States
2nd place, silver medalist(s)		Amadou Dia Ba; Senegal
3rd place, bronze medalist(s)		Edwin Moses; United States

The men's 400 metres hurdles at the 1988 Summer Olympics in Seoul, South Korea had an entry list of 38 competitors, with five qualifying heats (38 runners) and two semifinals (16) before the final (8) took place on Sunday September 25, 1988. One athlete did not start, so there were 37 competitors from 28 nations. The maximum number of athletes per nation had been set at 3 since the 1930 Olympic Congress. The event was won by Andre Phillips of the United States, the nation's second consecutive and 14th overall victory in the event. Amadou Dia Ba earned Senegal's first medal in the event with his silver. Dia Ba broke up a potential American sweep, as 1976 and 1984 champion Edwin Moses took bronze and Kevin Young placed fourth. Moses was the second man to earn three medals in the event (after Morgan Taylor from 1924 to 1932).

== Background ==
This was the 19th time the event was held. It had been introduced along with the men's 200 metres hurdles in 1900, with the 200 being dropped after 1904 and the 400 being held through 1908 before being left off the 1912 programme. However, when the Olympics returned in 1920 after World War I, the men's 400 metres hurdles was back and would continue to be contested at every Games thereafter.

Three of the eight finalists from the 1984 Games returned: gold medalist (and 1976 champion) Edwin Moses of the United States, bronze medalist Harald Schmid of West Germany, and fifth-place finisher Amadou Dia Bâ of Senegal. Fourth-place finisher Sven Nylander of Sweden was entered but did not start. Moses had won over 100 consecutive finals in nearly 10 years starting in August 1977, but had finally been beaten in June 1987. No longer unbeatable, Moses had still won the 1987 World Championships and the 1988 U.S. Olympic trials—both featured very strong fields.

Barbados, Fiji, Honduras, Nepal, Sierra Leone, and South Korea each made their debut in the event. The United States made its 18th appearance, most of any nation, having missed only the boycotted 1980 Games.

== Competition format ==
The competition used the three-round format used every Games since 1908 (except the four-round competition in 1952): quarterfinals, semifinals, and a final. Ten sets of hurdles were set on the course. The hurdles were 3 feet (91.5 centimetres) tall and were placed 35 metres apart beginning 45 metres from the starting line, resulting in a 40 metres home stretch after the last hurdle. The 400 metres track was standard.

There were 5 quarterfinal heats with between 7 and 8 athletes each. The top 3 men in each quarterfinal advanced to the semifinals along with the next fastest 1 overall. The 16 semifinalists were divided into 2 semifinals of 8 athletes each, with the top 4 in each semifinal advancing to the 8-man final.

== Records ==
These were the standing world and Olympic records (in seconds) prior to the 1988 Summer Olympics.

World record	Edwin Moses (USA)	47.02	Koblenz, West Germany	31 August 1983
Olympic record	Edwin Moses (USA)	47.64	Montreal, Canada	25 July 1976

Andre Phillips set a new Olympic record in the final with a time of 47.19 seconds.

== Schedule ==
All times are Korea Standard Time adjusted for daylight savings (UTC+10)

Date	Time	Round
Friday, 23 September 1988	11:10	Quarterfinals
Saturday, 24 September 1988	16:00	Semifinals
Sunday, 25 September 1988	13:35	Final

== Results ==
=== Quarterfinals ===
The quarterfinals were held on Friday September 23, 1988.

==== Quarterfinal 1 ====
Rank	Athlete	Nation	Time	Notes
1	Amadou Dia Ba	Senegal	49.41	Q
2	Klaus Ehrle	Austria	50.10	Q
3	John Graham	Canada	50.30	Q
4	Hwang Hong-Chul	South Korea	50.52	
5	Philip Harries	Great Britain	50.81	
6	Jasem Aldowaila	Kuwait	51.87	
7	Dambar Kunwar	Nepal	56.80	
—	Sven Nylander	Sweden	DNS	

==== Quarterfinal 2 ====
Rank	Athlete	Nation	Time	Notes
1	Harald Schmid	West Germany	49.77	Q
2	Simon Kitur	Kenya	49.88	Q
3	Alain Cuypers	Belgium	50.42	Q
4	Ahmed Ghanem	Egypt	50.44	
5	Ryoichi Yoshida	Japan	50.49	
6	Samuel Matete	Zambia	51.06	
7	Domingo Cordero	Puerto Rico	51.26	
8	Jorge Fidel Ponce	Honduras	55.38	

==== Quarterfinal 3 ====
Rank	Athlete	Nation	Time	Notes
1	Edwin Moses	United States	49.38	Q
2	Edgar Itt	West Germany	50.10	Q
3	José Alonso	Spain	50.12	Q
4	Leigh Miller	Australia	50.53	
5	Branislav Karaulić	Yugoslavia	51.32	
6	Allan Ince	Barbados	52.76	
7	Oral Selkridge	Antigua and Barbuda	53.44	

==== Quarterfinal 4 ====
Rank	Athlete	Nation	Time	Notes
1	Kevin Young	United States	49.35	Q
2	Kriss Akabusi	Great Britain	49.62	Q
3	Gideon Yego	Kenya	49.80	Q
4	Jozef Kucej	Czechoslovakia	49.89	
5	Rok Kopitar	Yugoslavia	50.54	
6	Hamidou M'Baye	Senegal	50.58	
7	Benjamin Grant	Sierra Leone	51.73	
8	Joseph Rodan	Fiji	53.66	

==== Quarterfinal 5 ====
Rank	Athlete	Nation	Time	Notes
1	Andre Phillips	United States	49.34	Q
2	Winthrop Graham	Jamaica	49.40	Q
3	Joseph Maritim	Kenya	49.64	Q
4	Toma Tomov	Bulgaria	49.66	q
5	Max Robertson	Great Britain	50.67	
6	Ahmed Hamada Jassim	Bahrain	51.34	
7	Yousif Al-Dossary	Saudi Arabia	53.51	

=== Semifinals ===
The semifinals were held on Saturday September 24, 1988.

==== Semifinal 1 ====
Rank	Athlete	Nation	Time	Notes	LANE
1	3	Edwin Moses	United States	47.89	Q
2	5	Kevin Young	United States	48.56	Q
3	1	Harald Schmid	West Germany	48.93	Q
4	6	Kriss Akabusi	Great Britain	49.22	Q
5	4	Joseph Maritim	Kenya	49.50	
6	8	José Alonso	Spain	49.57	
7	2	Klaus Ehrle	Austria	51.04	
8	7	John Graham	Canada	51.33	

==== Semifinal 2 ====
Rank	Athlete	Nation	Time	Notes	LANE
1	5	Andre Phillips	United States	48.19	Q
2	6	Winthrop Graham	Jamaica	48.37	Q
3	4	Amadou Dia Ba	Senegal	48.48	Q
4	2	Edgar Itt	West Germany	48.86	Q
5	3	Toma Tomov	Bulgaria	48.90	
6	1	Simon Kitur	Kenya	49.74	
7	7	Alain Cuypers	Belgium	49.75	
—	8	Gideon Yego	Kenya	DSQ	

=== Final ===
Rank	Lane	Athlete	Nation	Time	Notes
1st place, gold medalist(s)	6	Andre Phillips	United States	47.19	OR
2nd place, silver medalist(s)	5	Amadou Dia Ba	Senegal	47.23	NR
3rd place, bronze medalist(s)	3	Edwin Moses	United States	47.56	
4	2	Kevin Young	United States	47.94	
5	4	Winthrop Graham	Jamaica	48.04	
6	7	Kriss Akabusi	Great Britain	48.69	
7	1	Harald Schmid	West Germany	48.76	
8	8	Edgar Itt	West Germany	48.78	

== Results summary ==
Rank	Athlete	Nation	Quarterfinals	Semifinals	Final	Notes
1st place, gold medalist(s)	Andre Phillips	United States	49.34	48.19	47.19	OR
2nd place, silver medalist(s)	Amadou Dia Ba	Senegal	49.41	48.48	47.23	NR
3rd place, bronze medalist(s)	Edwin Moses	United States	49.38	47.89	47.56	
4	Kevin Young	United States	49.35	48.56	47.94	
5	Winthrop Graham	Jamaica	49.40	48.37	48.04	
6	Kriss Akabusi	Great Britain	49.62	49.22	48.69	
7	Harald Schmid	West Germany	49.77	48.93	48.76	
8	Edgar Itt	West Germany	50.10	48.86	48.78	
9	Toma Tomov	Bulgaria	49.66	48.90	Did not advance	
10	Joseph Maritim	Kenya	49.64	49.50	Did not advance	
11	José Alonso	Spain	50.12	49.57	Did not advance	
12	Simon Kitur	Kenya	49.88	49.74	Did not advance	
13	Alain Cuypers	Belgium	50.42	49.75	Did not advance	
14	Klaus Ehrle	Austria	50.10	51.04	Did not advance	
15	John Graham	Canada	50.30	51.33	Did not advance	
16	Gideon Yego	Kenya	49.80	DSQ	Did not advance	
17	Jozef Kucej	Czechoslovakia	49.89	Did not advance		
18	Ahmed Ghanem	Egypt	50.44	Did not advance		
19	Ryoichi Yoshida	Japan	50.49	Did not advance		
20	Hwang Hong-Chul	South Korea	50.52	Did not advance		
21	Leigh Miller	Australia	50.53	Did not advance		
22	Rok Kopitar	Yugoslavia	50.54	Did not advance		
23	Hamidou M'Baye	Senegal	50.58	Did not advance		
24	Max Robertson	Great Britain	50.67	Did not advance		
25	Philip Harries	Great Britain	50.81	Did not advance		
26	Samuel Matete	Zambia	51.06	Did not advance		
27	Domingo Cordero	Puerto Rico	51.26	Did not advance		
28	Branislav Karaulić	Yugoslavia	51.32	Did not advance		
29	Ahmed Hamada Jassim	Bahrain	51.34	Did not advance		
30	Benjamin Grant	Sierra Leone	51.73	Did not advance		
31	Jasem Aldowaila	Kuwait	51.87	Did not advance		
32	Allan Ince	Barbados	52.76	Did not advance		
33	Oral Selkridge	Antigua and Barbuda	53.44	Did not advance		
34	Yousif Al-Dossary	Saudi Arabia	53.51	Did not advance		
35	Joseph Rodan	Fiji	53.66	Did not advance		
36	Jorge Fidel Ponce	Honduras	55.38	Did not advance		
37	Dambar Kunwar	Nepal	56.80	Did not advance		
—	Sven Nylander	Sweden	DNS	Did not advance		

== See also ==
- 1987 Men's World Championships 400m Hurdles (Rome)
- 1990 Men's European Championships 400m Hurdles (Split)
- 1991 Men's World Championships 400m Hurdles (Tokyo)
