= 1986 European Athletics Championships – Men's 400 metres hurdles =

Men's 400 metres hurdles at the European Athletics Championships

The men's 400 metres hurdles event at the 1986 European Athletics Championships was held in Stuttgart, then West Germany, at Neckarstadion on 26, 27, and 28 August 1986.

== Medalists ==
| Gold | Harald Schmid; West Germany |
| Silver | Aleksandr Vasilyev; Soviet Union |
| Bronze | Sven Nylander; Sweden |

== Results ==
=== Final ===
28 August

| Rank | Name | Nationality | Time | Notes |
|---|---|---|---|---|
| 1st place, gold medalist(s) | Harald Schmid | West Germany | 48.65 | |
| 2nd place, silver medalist(s) | Aleksandr Vasilyev | Soviet Union | 48.76 | |
| 3rd place, bronze medalist(s) | Sven Nylander | Sweden | 49.38 | |
| 4 | Toma Tomov | Bulgaria | 49.62 | |
| 5 | Tagir Zemskov | Soviet Union | 50.02 | |
| 6 | José Alonso | Spain | 50.30 | |
| 7 | Rik Tommelein | Belgium | 50.45 | |
| 8 | Athanassios Kalogiannis | Greece | 51.83 | |

=== Semi-finals ===
27 August

==== Semi-final 1 ====
| Rank | Name | Nationality | Time | Notes |
|---|---|---|---|---|
| 1 | Harald Schmid | West Germany | 49.17 | Q |
| 2 | José Alonso | Spain | 49.45 | Q |
| 3 | Tagir Zemskov | Soviet Union | 49.47 | Q |
| 4 | Athanassios Kalogiannis | Greece | 49.86 | Q |
| 5 | Luca Cosi | Italy | 50.28 | |
| 6 | Philippe Gonigam | France | 50.44 | |
| 7 | Phil Beattie | United Kingdom | 50.67 | |
| | Peter Scholz | West Germany | DQ | |

==== Semi-final 2 ====
| Rank | Name | Nationality | Time | Notes |
|---|---|---|---|---|
| 1 | Aleksandr Vasilyev | Soviet Union | 48.80 | Q |
| 2 | Sven Nylander | Sweden | 48.83 | NR Q |
| 3 | Toma Tomov | Bulgaria | 49.21 | Q |
| 4 | Rik Tommelein | Belgium | 49.77 | Q |
| 5 | Thomas Futterknecht | Austria | 49.82 | |
| 6 | Matthias Kaulin | West Germany | 50.00 | |
| 7 | Max Robertson | United Kingdom | 50.06 | |
| 8 | Jozef Kucej | Czechoslovakia | 50.42 | |

=== Heats ===
26 August

==== Heat 1 ====
| Rank | Name | Nationality | Time | Notes |
|---|---|---|---|---|
| 1 | Sven Nylander | Sweden | 49.80 | Q |
| 2 | Toma Tomov | Bulgaria | 50.02 | Q |
| 3 | José Alonso | Spain | 50.03 | Q |
| 4 | Matthias Kaulin | West Germany | 50.09 | q |
| 5 | Giorgio Rucli | Italy | 50.89 | |
| 6 | Alain Cuypers | Belgium | 51.27 | |

==== Heat 2 ====
| Rank | Name | Nationality | Time | Notes |
|---|---|---|---|---|
| 1 | Aleksandr Vasilyev | Soviet Union | 49.61 | Q |
| 2 | Peter Scholz | West Germany | 49.74 | Q |
| 3 | Rik Tommelein | Belgium | 49.92 | Q |
| 4 | Thomas Futterknecht | Austria | 50.17 | q |
| 5 | Luca Cosi | Italy | 50.69 | q |
| 6 | Georgios Vamvakas | Greece | 50.91 | |

==== Heat 3 ====
| Rank | Name | Nationality | Time | Notes |
|---|---|---|---|---|
| 1 | Harald Schmid | West Germany | 50.15 | Q |
| 2 | Philippe Gonigam | France | 50.45 | Q |
| 3 | Max Robertson | United Kingdom | 50.64 | Q |
| 4 | Ryszard Szparak | Poland | 50.70 | |
| 5 | Oleg Azarov | Soviet Union | 50.76 | |
| 6 | Ulf Sedlacek | Sweden | 51.58 | |
| 7 | Klaus Ehrle | Austria | 51.82 | |

==== Heat 4 ====
| Rank | Name | Nationality | Time | Notes |
|---|---|---|---|---|
| 1 | Tagir Zemskov | Soviet Union | 49.85 | Q |
| 2 | Athanassios Kalogiannis | Greece | 49.96 | Q |
| 3 | Jozef Kucej | Czechoslovakia | 50.00 | Q |
| 4 | Phil Beattie | United Kingdom | 50.00 | q |
| 5 | Thomas Nyberg | Sweden | 52.16 | |

== Participation ==
According to an unofficial count, 24 athletes from 13 countries participated in the event.

- Austria (2)
- Belgium (2)
- Bulgaria (1)
- Czechoslovakia (1)
- France (1)
- Greece (2)
- Italy (2)
- Poland (1)
- Soviet Union (3)
- Spain (1)
- Sweden (3)
- United Kingdom (2)
- West Germany (3)
