= Athletics at the 1982 Commonwealth Games – Men's 400 metres hurdles =

Men's 400 metres hurdles at the Commonwealth Games

The men's 400 metres hurdles event at the 1982 Commonwealth Games was held on 5 and 7 October at the QE II Stadium in Brisbane, Australia.

== Medalists ==
| Gold | Silver | Bronze |
|---|---|---|
| Garry Brown; Australia | Peter Rwamuhanda; Uganda | Greg Rolle; Bahamas |

== Results ==
=== Heats ===
Qualification: First 4 in each heat (Q) and the next 1 fastest (q) qualify for the final.

| Rank | Heat | Name | Nationality | Time | Notes |
|---|---|---|---|---|---|
| 1 | 2 | Garry Brown | Australia | 50.06 | Q |
| 2 | 2 | Mike Whittingham | England | 51.02 | Q |
| 3 | 2 | Karl Smith | Jamaica | 51.26 | Q |
| 4 | 2 | Stanley Devine | Scotland | 51.34 | Q |
| 5 | 1 | Peter Rwamuhanda | Uganda | 51.71 | Q |
| 6 | 1 | Greg Rolle | Bahamas | 51.91 | Q |
| 7 | 1 | Lloyd Guss | Canada | 51.95 | Q |
| 8 | 2 | Eric Spence | Canada | 52.01 | q |
| 9 | 1 | Gary Oakes | England | 52.05 | Q |
| 10 | 1 | Phil Beattie | Northern Ireland | 52.15 | |
| 11 | 1 | Meshak Munyoro | Kenya | 52.22 | |
| 12 | 2 | Wilbert Greaves | England | 52.81 | |
| 13 | 2 | Paiwa Bogela | Papua New Guinea | 53.93 | |
| 14 | 1 | David McCutcheon | Isle of Man | 54.46 | |
| 15 | 2 | Ian Newhouse | Canada | 54.81 | |
| 16 | 1 | Joseph Rodan | Fiji | 55.09 | |
| 17 | 1 | Lau Chi Keung | Hong Kong | 56.17 | |
| 18 | 2 | William Pakoa | Vanuatu | 1:00.06 | |

=== Final ===
| Rank | Lane | Name | Nationality | Time | Notes |
|---|---|---|---|---|---|
| 1st place, gold medalist(s) | 8 | Garry Brown | Australia | 49.37 | |
| 2nd place, silver medalist(s) | 2 | Peter Rwamuhanda | Uganda | 49.95 | |
| 3rd place, bronze medalist(s) | 7 | Greg Rolle | Bahamas | 50.50 | |
| 4 | 1 | Mike Whittingham | England | 51.04 | |
| 5 | 6 | Lloyd Guss | Canada | 51.23 | |
| 6 | 5 | Stanley Devine | Scotland | 51.68 | |
| 7 | 3 | Eric Spence | Canada | 51.84 | |
| 8 | 9 | Gary Oakes | England | 51.96 | |
| 9 | 4 | Karl Smith | Jamaica | 53.52 | |
