= Kitur =

Kitur is a surname of Kenyan origin that may refer to:

- Samson Kitur (1966—2003), Kenyan sprinter and Olympic and world medallist
- David Kitur (born 1962), Kenyan sprinter and All-Africa Games medallist
- Simon Kitur (born 1959), Kenyan 400 metres hurdler, brother of David and Samson
- Joseph Kitur Kiplimo (born 1988), Kenyan long-distance track runner

== See also ==
- Keter (name)
