= 1990 European Athletics Championships – Men's 400 metres hurdles =

Men's 400 metres hurdles at the European Athletics Championships

These are the official results of the Men's 400 metres hurdles event at the 1990 European Championships in Split, Yugoslavia, held at Stadion Poljud on 27, 28, and 29 August 1990.

== Medalists ==
Gold	Kriss Akabusi; United Kingdom
Silver	Sven Nylander; Sweden
Bronze	Niklas Wallenlind; Sweden

== Results ==
=== Final ===
29 August

Rank	Name	Nationality	Time	Notes
1st place, gold medalist(s)	Kriss Akabusi	United Kingdom	47.92	NR
2nd place, silver medalist(s)	Sven Nylander	Sweden	48.43	
3rd place, bronze medalist(s)	Niklas Wallenlind	Sweden	48.52	
4	Vadim Zadoinov	Soviet Union	48.61	NR
5	Stéphane Diagana	France	48.92	
6	Carsten Köhrbrück	West Germany	48.95	
7	José Alonso	Spain	49.77	
8	Edgar Itt	West Germany	49.83	

=== Semi-finals ===
28 August

==== Semi-final 1 ====
Rank	Name	Nationality	Time	Notes
1	Kriss Akabusi	United Kingdom	48.84	Q
2	Stéphane Diagana	France	49.26	Q
3	Vadim Zadoinov	Soviet Union	49.34	Q
4	José Alonso	Spain	49.92	Q
5	Jozef Kucej	Czechoslovakia	50.52	
6	Olaf Hense	West Germany	50.53	
7	Paweł Woźniak	Poland	50.94	
8	Thomas Nyberg	Sweden	51.02	

==== Semi-final 2 ====
Rank	Name	Nationality	Time	Notes
1	Niklas Wallenlind	Sweden	48.80	Q
2	Sven Nylander	Sweden	48.82	Q
3	Carsten Köhrbrück	West Germany	49.04	Q
4	Edgar Itt	West Germany	49.24	Q
5	Max Robertson	United Kingdom	49.25	
6	Aleksey Bazarov	Soviet Union	49.37	
7	Koen Verlinde	Belgium	49.90	
8	Krasimir Demirev	Bulgaria	50.39	

=== Heats ===
27 August

==== Heat 1 ====
Rank	Name	Nationality	Time	Notes
1	Kriss Akabusi	United Kingdom	50.08	Q
2	Vadim Zadoinov	Soviet Union	50.34	Q
3	Koen Verlinde	Belgium	50.50	Q
4	Olaf Hense	West Germany	50.74	q
5	Paweł Woźniak	Poland	51.09	q
6	Vesa-Pekka Pihlavisto	Finland	51.59	
7	Santiago Fraga	Spain	52.00	
	Rok Kopitar	Yugoslavia	DNF	

==== Heat 2 ====
Rank	Name	Nationality	Time	Notes
1	Max Robertson	United Kingdom	50.27	Q
2	Carsten Köhrbrück	West Germany	50.39	Q
3	Stéphane Diagana	France	50.49	Q
4	Krasimir Demirev	Bulgaria	50.59	q
5	Mugur Mateescu	Romania	51.63	
6	Branislav Karaulić	Yugoslavia	53.26	
	Ilan Goldwasser	Israel	DNS	

==== Heat 3 ====
Rank	Name	Nationality	Time	Notes
1	Edgar Itt	West Germany	50.93	Q
2	Jozef Kucej	Czechoslovakia	51.01	Q
3	Niklas Wallenlind	Sweden	51.06	Q
4	Daniel Ritter	Switzerland	51.24	
5	Mauro Maurizi	Italy	51.27	
6	Aleksandr Belikov	Soviet Union	51.31	
7	Marc Dollendorf	Belgium	51.60	

==== Heat 4 ====
Rank	Name	Nationality	Time	Notes
1	Sven Nylander	Sweden	50.28	Q
2	José Alonso	Spain	50.36	Q
3	Thomas Nyberg	Sweden	50.83	Q
4	Aleksey Bazarov	Soviet Union	50.84	q
5	Athanassios Kalogiannis	Greece	51.37	
6	Miro Kocuvan	Yugoslavia	51.37	
7	Pedro Rodrigues	Portugal	52.03	

== Participation ==
According to an unofficial count, 28 athletes from 17 countries participated in the event.

- Belgium (2)
- Bulgaria (1)
- Czechoslovakia (1)
- Finland (1)
- France (1)
- Greece (1)
- Italy (1)
- Poland (1)
- Portugal (1)
- Romania (1)
- Soviet Union (3)
- Spain (2)
- Sweden (3)
- Switzerland (1)
- United Kingdom (2)
- West Germany (3)
- Yugoslavia (3)

== See also ==
- 1988 Men's Olympic 400m Hurdles (Seoul)
- 1991 Men's World Championships 400m Hurdles (Tokyo)
- 1992 Men's Olympic 400m Hurdles (Barcelona)
