= Karl Smith (athlete) =

Jamaican hurdler

Karl Smith (born 15 September 1959) is a Jamaican track and field athlete specializing in the hurdles. He ran for his native country in the 1984 Olympics in the 400 metres hurdles and on their 4 × 400 metres relay team. In the hurdles, he finished behind medalists Danny Harris and Harald Schmid in the semi-final round, not qualifying for the final.

Smith competed for the Texas Longhorns men's track and field team in the NCAA.

The top Jamaican hurdler in his day, Smith is still ranked #19 all time.

Smith has continued to run hurdles in Masters athletics, holding the world record in the 110 metres hurdles.

== International competitions ==
Year	Competition	Venue	Position	Event	Notes
Representing Jamaica
1975	CARIFTA Games (U20)	Hamilton, Bermuda	3rd	110 m hurdles	15.4
1977	CARIFTA Games (U20)	Bridgetown, Barbados	1st	110 m hurdles	14.45
1977	CARIFTA Games (U20)	Bridgetown, Barbados	1st	4 × 100 m relay	41.40
1978	Central American and Caribbean Games	Medellín, Colombia	3rd	110 m hurdles	14.71
1981	Central American and Caribbean Championships	Santo Domingo, Dominican Republic	2nd	110 m hurdles	13.94
1982	Central American and Caribbean Games	Havana, Cuba	4th	110 m hurdles	14.13
1982	Central American and Caribbean Games	Havana, Cuba	4th	400 m hurdles	51.25
1982	Central American and Caribbean Games	Havana, Cuba	2nd	4 × 400 m relay	3:04.78
1982	Commonwealth Games	Brisbane, Australia	8th	110 m hurdles	14.11
1982	Commonwealth Games	Brisbane, Australia	9th	400 m hurdles	53.52
1983	World Championships	Helsinki, Finland	11th (sf)	400 m hurdles	49.99
1983	World Championships	Helsinki, Finland	13th (h)	4 × 400 m relay	3:09.06
1984	Olympic Games	Los Angeles, United States	8th (sf)	400 m hurdles	49.58
1984	Olympic Games	Los Angeles, United States	10th (sf)	4 × 400 m relay	3:04.24
1985	World Indoor Games	Paris, France	17th (h)	60 m hurdles	8.19
