= Danny Harris =

American hurdler

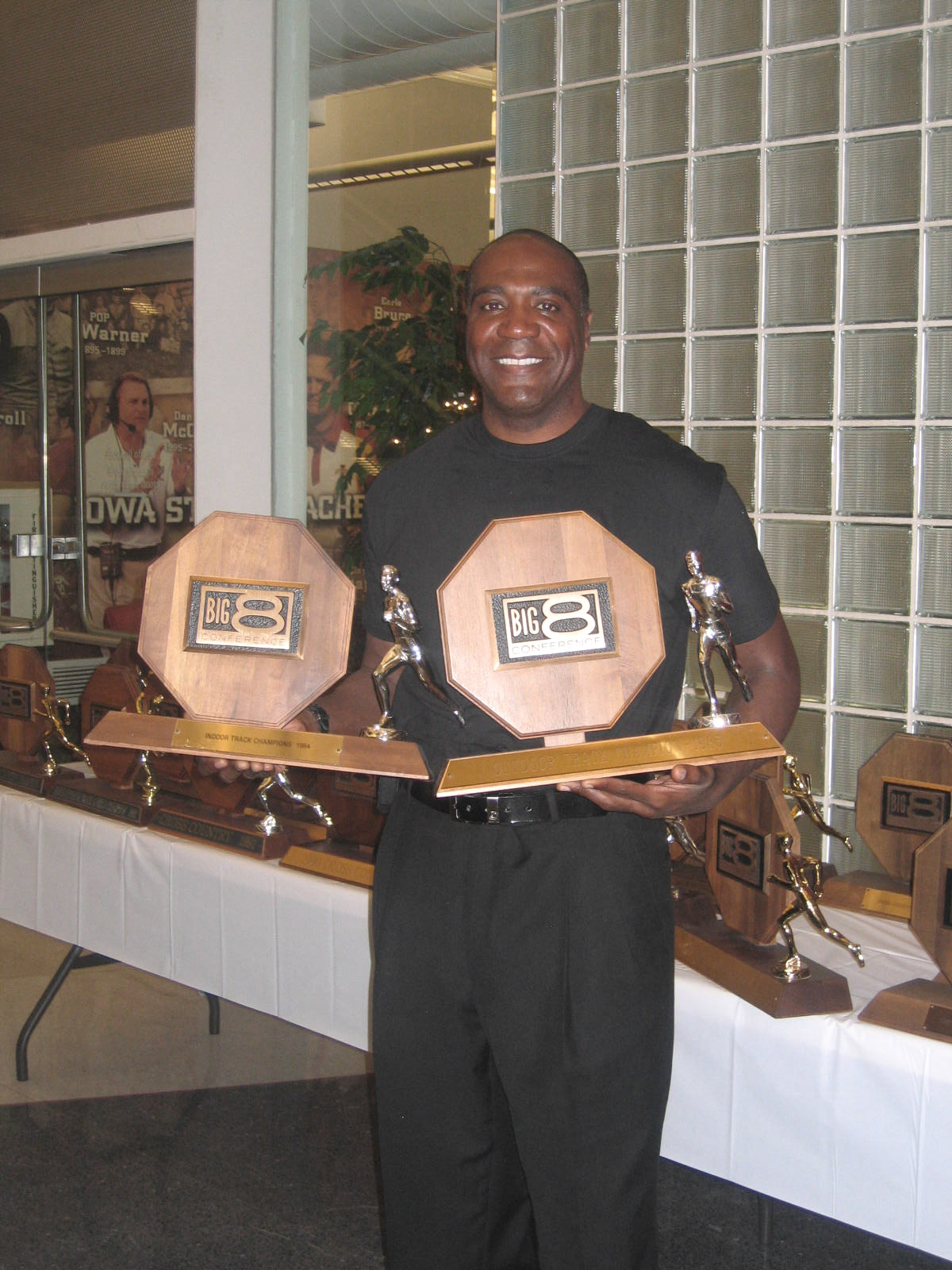
- Harris at the 2008 Iowa State Track and Field Reunion

Personal information
- Full name: Danny Lee Harris
- Born: September 7, 1965 (age 60) Torrance, California, U.S.
Medal record
Men's athletics
Representing United States
Olympic Games
Silver medal – second place	1984 Los Angeles	400 m hurdles
World Championships
Silver medal – second place	1987 Rome	400 m hurdles

Danny Lee Harris (born September 7, 1965) is an American former track and field athlete who specialized in the 400-meter hurdles (400 mH), in which he won silver medals at the 1984 Olympics and the 1987 World Championships.

== Hurdling career ==
Danny Harris is an alumnus of Perris High School in Perris, California, where he grew up. In 1983, he won the CIF California State Championship in the 300 mH, and ran a thrilling anchor leg vs Hawthorne High School's Henry Thomas in the team's second place 4 × 400 meters relay team, leading Perris to its most impressive showing at the event.

Harris attended Iowa State University and competed for the Iowa State Cyclones track and field. His time of 48.02 in 1984 at age 18 remained the 400 mH world under-20 record until Sean Burrell's 47.85 in 2021. Harris finished second to Ed Moses in the 1984 Olympic final. He collected three NCAA 400 mH titles and four Drake Relays titles while at Iowa State. He was never beaten by a collegiate athlete in the 400 mH during his time at Iowa State, and helped lead the Cyclones to three outdoor Big Eight team titles and two indoor crowns during his three-year career, collecting 12 titles. He set Big Eight records in the 400 mH, 600 yards and 4 × 400 relay.

At a meeting in Madrid in 1987, Harris became the first man to defeat Edwin Moses at 400 mH since Harald Schmid in 1977, though Moses narrowly beat Harris in the 1987 World Championships. Harris missed out on the 1988 Olympics after finishing fifth in the U.S. Olympic Trials, behind Moses, Andre Phillips and Kevin Young (respectively the 1984, 1988, and 1992 Olympic champions).

Harris' personal best for the 400 mH was 47.38 seconds, set at Athletissima in Lausanne in July 1991. He finished fifth in that year's World Championships. He failed an anti-doping test at the 1992 USA Indoor Track and Field Championships and the IAAF suspended him for four years. After he completed a drug rehabilitation program, USA Track & Field agreed to lift his ban in 1994, but after a few weeks the IAAF reimposed it until the following year. He was fourth in the 1995 400 mH world rankings, but a hamstring injury kept him out of the 1995 World Championships. His career ended with a second positive cocaine test after a 1996 race in Rio de Janeiro.

In his 1999 autobiography, Roger Black said of Harris: "He was without doubt the most talented athlete I've ever trained with. ... The irony of the whole thing was, cocaine was not making him a better athlete, it was making him worse."

== Later life ==
By his own admission, Harris began using cocaine during his disappointment at missing out on the 1988 Olympics and relapsed after missing a medal in 1991. After his 1992 doping ban he lost his shoe deal and had to sell his house in Los Angeles. In the decade after his 1996 ban he experienced periods of serious addiction and homelessness. By 2008 he was clean and working at the Midnight Mission homeless shelter where he had previously been a client.

Harris later worked as a track coach at various high schools. He had helped Perris High School boys' track team in 2001 to their first League Championship since his own time as a student there.

Harris was inducted into the Drake Relays Hall of Fame in 1995, the Iowa State Hall of Fame in 2000, and the Iowa Sports Hall of Fame in 2005. In 2016, Crossing the Line, a documentary film about his life, was shown at film festivals.

Achievements
Preceded by Edwin Moses; Kevin Young	Men's 400 m hurdles season's best 1985; 1990	Succeeded by Edwin Moses; Samuel Matete
Records
Preceded by ?	Men's 400 m hurdles world junior record holder 17 June 1984 – present	Incumbent
