= Meledje =

Meledje is a surname. Notable people with the surname include:

- René Mélédjé (born 1958), Ivorian hurdler
- Yaya Meledje (born 1997), Ivorian footballer
