= Peter Scholz =

German hurdler (born 1959)

Peter Scholz (born 31 October 1959) is a retired West German hurdler.

He competed in 400 metres hurdles at the 1986 European Championships, being disqualified in the semi-final. In the 400 m hurdles, he only won one silver medal at the West German championships, in 1986 behind the long-reigning Harald Schmid. He did however become West German champion in the 110 metres hurdles in 1984. He represented the club Eintracht Frankfurt.

His personal best times were 13.95 seconds in the 110 metres hurdles, achieved in July 1981 in Schweinfurt; and 49.41 seconds in the 400 metres hurdles, achieved in June 1987 in Stuttgart.
