= Aleksandr Vasilyev (hurdler) =

Medal record

Men's athletics

Representing the Soviet Union

Friendship Games
Gold medal – first place	1984 Moscow	400 m hurdles

European Championships
Silver medal – second place	1986 Stuttgart	400 m hurdles

IAAF World Cup
Silver medal – second place	1985 Canberra	400 m hurdles

Aleksandr Vasilyev (Russian: Александр Васильев; born 26 July 1961) is a Belarusian former track and field hurdler who competed in the 400 metres hurdles for the Soviet Union. He set his lifetime best of 47.92 seconds for the event in Moscow in 1985. This remains the Belarusian national record.

Vasilyev established himself with a gold medal at the Friendship Games in 1984. A slew of silver medals followed at the 1985 European Cup, 1985 IAAF World Cup, 1986 European Athletics Championships, and the 1986 Goodwill Games.

He won four consecutive national title at the Soviet Athletics Championships from 1985 to 1988. He ranked as Europe's second best 400 m hurdler in 1984, 1985 and 1986, behind only Harald Schmid. His highest career global ranking was in 1985, when he was fourth on the world lists.

== International competitions ==
Year	Competition	Venue	Position	Event	Notes
1984	Friendship Games	Moscow, Soviet Union	1st	400 m hurdles	48.63
1985	European Cup	Moscow, Soviet Union	2nd	400 m hurdles	47.92
1985	World Cup	Canberra, Australia	2nd	400 m hurdles	48.61
1985	World Cup	Canberra, Australia	5th	4 × 400 m relay	3:03.17
1986	Goodwill Games	Moscow, Soviet Union	2nd	400 m hurdles	48.24
1986	European Championships	Stuttgart, West Germany	2nd	400 m hurdles	48.76
1987	World Championships	Rome, Italy	— (semis)	400 m hurdles	DNF

== National titles ==
- Soviet Athletics Championships
  - 400 m hurdles: 1985, 1986, 1987, 1988
