= Keter (disambiguation) =

Keter, in Kabbalah, is one of the ten Sephirot ("Divine emanations")

Keter may also refer to:

- Keter (name), a name of Kenyan origin
- Keter, a component of Yesod (web framework)
- Keter Plastic, an Israeli plastic manufacturing company
- Keter Publishing House, a book publisher based in Israel
- Tag (Hebrew writing), a calligraphic ornament also called keter
- Keter Aram Tzova, another name of the Hebrew Bible manuscript also called the Aleppo Codex.
- Keter, a classification for hard-to-contain anomalies in the fictional SCP Foundation universe
