= Ken Gray =

Ken Gray may refer to:

- Ken Gray (American football) (1936–2017), American football offensive guard
- Ken Gray (athlete) (born 1962), Jamaican Olympic hurdler
- Ken Gray (rugby union) (1938–1992), New Zealand rugby player
- Ken Gray (politician), Nevada politician

== See also ==
- Kenneth J. Gray (1924–2014), U.S. Representative from Illinois
