= Yatsevich =

Yatsevich is a surname. Notable people with the surname include:

- Aleksandr Yatsevich (born 1956), Russian hurdler
- Kirill Yatsevich (born 1992), Russian track cyclist
- Nastassia Yatsevich (born 1985), Belarusian race walker

== See also ==
- Aleksandrs Jackevičs (born 1958), Latvian judoka
