= Athletics at the Friendship Games – Men's 400 metres hurdles =

The men's 400 metres hurdles event at the Friendship Games was held on 17 and 18 August 1984 at the Grand Arena of the Central Lenin Stadium in Moscow, Soviet Union.

== Medalists ==
Gold	Silver	Bronze
Aleksandr Vasilyev; Soviet Union	Vladimir Budko; Soviet Union	Toma Tomov; Bulgaria

== Results ==
=== Heats ===
Rank	Heat	Name	Nationality	Time	Notes
1	2	Aleksandr Vasilyev	Soviet Union	49.77	Q
2	3	Vladimir Budko	Soviet Union	49.96	Q
3	2	Toma Tomov	Bulgaria	50.18	Q
4	3	Vasyl Arkhypenko	Soviet Union	50.47	Q
5	2	Julio Osvaldo Prado	Cuba	50.48	Q
6	3	József Szalai	Hungary	50.67	Q
7	3	István Takács	Hungary	50.80	q
8	?	Ryszard Szparak	Poland	??.??	q
9	?	F. Montiet	Cuba	51.29	
10	?	Bozhidar Konstantinov	Bulgaria	51.35	
11	?	Stanislav Návesňák	Czechoslovakia	51.49	
12	?	Francisco González	Colombia	52.80	

=== Extra ===
Out of competition performances

Rank	Heat	Name	Nationality	Time	Notes
1	1	Aleksandr Kharlov	Soviet Union	50.09	
2	1	Valeriy Vikhrov	Soviet Union	50.24	
3	1	Sergey Melnikov	Soviet Union	50.75	

=== Final ===
Rank	Name	Nationality	Time	Notes
1st place, gold medalist(s)	Aleksandr Vasilyev	Soviet Union	48.63	
2nd place, silver medalist(s)	Vladimir Budko	Soviet Union	48.74	
3rd place, bronze medalist(s)	Toma Tomov	Bulgaria	49.29	
4	Vasyl Arkhypenko	Soviet Union	49.67	
5	Julio Osvaldo Prado	Cuba	49.77	
6	József Szalai	Hungary	50.44	
7	István Takács	Hungary	50.44	
8	Ryszard Szparak	Poland	50.68	

== See also ==
- Athletics at the 1984 Summer Olympics – Men's 400 metres hurdles
