= Uwe Schmitt =

German sprinter and hurdler

Personal information
- Nationality: German
- Born: 17 August 1961 Marburg, West Germany
- Died: 17 December 1995 (aged 34) Bad Homburg vor der Höhe, Germany
- Height: 184 cm (6 ft 0 in)
- Weight: 74 kg (163 lb)

Sport
- Sport: Athletics (Sprinting and hurdles)
- Event: 4 × 400 metres relay

Uwe Schmitt (17 August 1961 – 17 December 1995) was a German sprinter and hurdler. He competed in the 1984 Summer Olympics and won five medals in the West German Athletics Championships.

== Career ==
At the 1979 European Junior Championships, he won a gold medal in the 4 × 400 metres relay. He competed in the 400 metres hurdles and 4 × 400 metres relay at the 1984 Summer Olympics representing West Germany. He also competed at the 1987 World Championships, but was knocked out in the heats.

In the 400 m hurdles, he won the silver medal at the 1985 West German championships behind the long-reigning Harald Schmid, and four bronze medals in 1983, 1984, 1986, and 1988. He represented the club Eintracht Frankfurt.

His personal best times were 46.19 seconds in the 400 metres and 49.39 seconds in the 400 metres hurdles, both achieved in August 1985 in Stuttgart.

== Death ==
He died in 1995 at the age of 34. The cause of death was suicide.
