= Kipketer =

Kipketer is a surname of Kenyan origin that means "son of Keter". It may refer to:

- Alfred Kipketer (born 1996), Kenyan middle-distance runner and 2013 world youth champion
- Sammy Kipketer (born 1981), Kenyan long-distance runner and 2002 Commonwealth Games champion
- Valentine Kipketer (born 1993), Kenyan marathon runner
- Wilson Kipketer (born 1972), Danish-Kenyan former middle distance runner and three-time 800 metres world champion
- Wilson Boit Kipketer (born 1973), Kenyan former steeplechase runner and 1997 world champion
