= Ryszard Szparak =

Polish former athlete (born 1951)

Personal information
- Born: 2 July 1951 Olsztyn, Poland
- Height: 1.78 m (5 ft 10 in)
- Weight: 67 kg (148 lb)

Sport
- Sport: Athletics
- Event: 400 m hurdles
- Club: Gwardia Olsztyn

Ryszard Szparak (born 2 July 1951 in Olsztyn) is a Polish former athlete who specialised in the 400 metres hurdles. He represented his country at the 1980 Summer Olympics, as well as the 1983 World Championships and two European Championships.

His personal bests are 49.17 seconds in the 400 metres hurdles (Helsinki 1983) and 46.84 seconds in the 400 metres (1983).

== International competitions ==
Year	Competition	Venue	Position	Event	Notes
Representing Poland
1980	Olympic Games	Moscow, Soviet Union	7th (sf)	400 m hurdles	50.41
1982	European Championships	Athens, Greece	5th	400 m hurdles	49.41
1982	European Championships	Athens, Greece	4th	4 × 400 m relay	3:02.77
1983	World Championships	Helsinki, Finland	8th	400 m hurdles	49.78
1983	World Championships	Helsinki, Finland	10th (sf)	4 × 400 m relay	3:05.51^{1}
1984	Friendship Games	Moscow, Soviet Union	8th	400 m hurdles	50.68
1984	Friendship Games	Moscow, Soviet Union	5th	4 × 400 m relay	3:06.03
1986	European Championships	Stuttgart, West Germany	17th (h)	400 m hurdles	50.70
