= Domingos Mendes =

Mozambican hurdler

Personal information
- Nationality: Mozambican
- Born: 10 August 1961 (age 64)

Sport
- Sport: Track and field
- Event: 400 metres hurdles

Domingos Mendes (born 10 August 1961) is a Mozambican hurdler. He competed in the men's 400 metres hurdles at the 1984 Summer Olympics.
