= Vincent Confait =

Seychellois sprinter

Personal information
- Nationality: Seychellois
- Born: 28 October 1959 (age 66)

Sport
- Sport: Sprinting
- Event: 400 metres
Medal record
Men's athletics
Representing the Seychelles
Indian Ocean Island Games
Gold medal – first place	1979 Réunion	4 × 400 m relay
Silver medal – second place	1979 Réunion	400 m hurdles
Silver medal – second place	1985 Curepipe	400 m hurdles

Vincent Confait (born 28 October 1959) is a Seychellois sprinter. He competed in the men's 4 × 100 metres relay and 4 × 400 metres relay at the 1980 Summer Olympics, and the 400 metres and 400 metres hurdles at the 1984 Summer Olympics.

== Career ==
Confait won a gold and two silver medals at the Indian Ocean Island Games beginning in 1979. He ran third leg on the Seychellois 4 × 400 m relay team to win the 1979 Games, and he also won individual 400 m hurdles silver medals at the 1979 and 1985 Games.

At the 1980 Summer Olympics, Confait's 4 × 100 m and 4 × 400 m teams both finished 7th in their heats, failing to advance to the finals.

Since 1981, Confait won nineteen individual Seychelles Athletics Federation national titles in the 400 metres, 800 metres, 110 metres hurdles, and 400 metres hurdles.

Confait was the sole male Seychelles representative at the 1983 World Championships in Athletics, where he finished 7th in his 800 m heat.

In 1984, Confait competed in both the 1984 Summer Olympics and the Soviet boycott Friendship Games competition later that month. Confait was disqualified from his Olympic 400 m heat and placed 7th in his 400 m hurdles heat, failing to advance in both events. However, Confait placed 9th overall in the Friendship Games 400 metres competition.

Confait continued to compete in masters athletics, setting the Seychellois 10,000 metres masters record in 2006.

== Personal life ==
Confait married Sheila Confait and had a son Alex Confait, who was a Flydubai crew member and also competed and officiated in athletics events. In 2016, his son was one of the seven crew-members killed in the Flydubai Flight 981 aeroplane crash.
