= Martin Briggs (athlete) =

British hurdler

Personal information
- Nationality: British (English)
- Born: 4 January 1964 (age 62) Stoke-on-Trent, England
- Height: 180 cm (5 ft 11 in)
- Weight: 75 kg (165 lb)

Sport
- Sport: Athletics
- Event: 400 metres hurdles
- Club: Stoke AC

Martin Christopher Briggs (born 4 January 1964) is a British hurdler who competed at the 1984 Summer Olympics.

== Biography ==
At the 1984 Olympic Games in Los Angeles, Briggs represented Great Britain in the men's 400 metres hurdles event.

Briggs finished third behind Max Robertson in the 400 metres hurdles event at both the 1987 AAA Championships and 1988 AAA Championships.

Briggs became the British 400 metres hurdles champion after winning the UK Athletics Championships title in 1984.
