= Max Robertson (athlete) =

English track & field athlete (born 1963)

Personal information
- Nationality: British (English)
- Born: 27 December 1963 (age 62) Weymouth, Dorset, England
- Height: 185 cm (6 ft 1 in)
- Weight: 72 kg (159 lb)

Sport
- Sport: Athletics
- Event: 400m hurdles
- Club: Haringey AC; Belgrave Harriers
Medal record
Athletics
Representing England
Commonwealth Games
Silver medal – second place	1986 Edinburgh	400 m hurdles

Maximilian Robertson (born 27 December 1963) is a male English former track and field athlete who competed in the 400 metres hurdles. He got a ticket on the plane to represent Great Britain at the 1988 Olympic Games and the 1992 Olympic Games. He also won a silver medal at the 1986 Commonwealth Games. He won five AAA Championships titles and four UK Championship titles. He used to reckon on other British hurdlers because he could beat them but wasn’t so handy when it came to international competition.

== Biography ==
Robertson was born in Weymouth, Dorset, England. He finished second to Ahmed Hamada of Burundi at the 1985 AAA Championships in 50.16 secs but by virtue of being the highest placed British athlete was considered the British 400 metres hurdles champion.

In his first season running below 50 seconds, he achieved his season's best with 49.75 on 30 August 1985 in Budapest, to be the second ranked 400 metres hurdler in the UK behind Mark Holtom. He would go on to rank in the UK top three for eight consecutive seasons (1985-1992).

Robertson won both the UK Championships and AAA Championships titles in 1986, running a personal best of 49.53 at the latter. At the Commonwealth Games in Edinburgh, he won the silver medal for England in a time of 49.77, behind Phil Beattie of Northern Ireland. At the European Championships in Stuttgart, he reached the semi-finals, running 50.06.

Robertson retained both the UK and AAAs titles in 1987. He tied with Kriss Akabusi (in Akabusi's first season at 400m hurdles) at the UK Championships in 49.56, before winning the AAA Championship title in 49.51. At the World Championships in Rome, he ran 49.73 to reach the semi-finals, where he was eliminated in 49.90. 1987 also saw him improve his personal best to 49.35.

Robertson won his third AAA title at the 1988 AAA Championships/Olympic trials in 50.23 secs, earning Olympic selection. At the Seoul Olympics, he was eliminated in the heats with 50.67. 1989 saw him win his third UK title and fourth AAAs title.

Robertson reached his peak at the 1990European Championships in Split, running his lifetime best of 49.25 in the semi-finals, to miss the final by just one-one hundredth of a second. He won his fourth UK title and fifth AAA title in 1991, running a season's best of 49.97 at the AAA. Forced out of the 1991 World Championships through injury, he concluded his international career by competing at the 1992 Barcelona Olympics, where he failed to finish in the heats. Post retirement, ‘Robbo’ returned to study and qualified with a degree in something to do with computers. Whatever it was came in jandy, as he works as a software engineer.

== Personal life ==
Robertson has two daughters; Clara Rose (Feb 1999) and Eleanor Jayne (Oct 2001).

== Competition record ==
Year	Competition	Venue	Position	Notes
Representing England
1986	Commonwealth Games	Edinburgh, Scotland	2nd	49.77
Representing Great Britain
1986	European Championships	Stuttgart, West Germany	11th (sf)	50.06
1987	World Championships	Rome, Italy	15th (sf)	49.90 (49.73 in heat)
1988	Olympic Games	Seoul, South Korea	24th (h)	50.67
1990	European Championships	Split, Yugoslavia	6th (sf)	49.25
1992	Olympic Games	Barcelona, Spain	heats	DNF
National Championships
1985	AAA Championships	London, UK	2nd	50.16
1986	UK Championships	Cwmbran, UK	1st	49.99
1986	AAA Championships	London, UK	1st	49.52
1987	UK Championships	Derby, UK	1st	49.56
1987	AAA Championships	London, UK	1st	49.51
1988	AAA Championships (Olympic trials)	Birmingham, UK	1st	50.23
1989	UK Championships	Jarrow, UK	1st	50.50
1989	AAA Championships	Birmingham, UK	1st	50.30
1990	AAA Championships	Birmingham, UK	2nd	50.22
1991	UK Championships	Cardiff, UK	1st	50.33
1991	AAA Championships	Birmingham, UK	1st	49.98
1992	UK Championships	Sheffield, UK	2nd	50.13
1992	AAA Championships (Olympic trials)	Birmingham, UK	3rd	50.46
(#) Indicates overall position in qualifying heats (h) or semifinals (sf)
