= Gérard Brunel =

French hurdler

Personal information
- Nationality: French
- Born: 17 August 1957 (age 68) Paris, France

Sport
- Sport: Track and field
- Event: 400 metres hurdles

Gérard Brunel (born 17 August 1957) is a French hurdler. He competed in the men's 400 metres hurdles at the 1984 Summer Olympics.
