= Gideon Yego =

Kenyan hurdler

Medal record

Men's athletics

Representing Kenya

African Championships
Silver medal – second place	1990 Cairo	110 m hurdles

Gideon Yego (born 28 August 1965) is a retired Kenyan athlete who specialized in the 400 metres hurdles.

He won silver medals at the 1987 All-Africa Games (in 110 metres hurdles), the 1990 Commonwealth Games, the 1990 African Championships and the 1991 All-Africa Games, the latter in a career best time of 49.09 seconds.

He also competed at the 1988 and 1992 Olympic Games as well as the 1991 World Championships without reaching the final.

== Achievements ==
Year	Competition	Venue	Position	Event	Notes
Representing Kenya
1987	All-Africa Games	Nairobi, Kenya	2nd	110 m hurdles	14.24
