= Allan Ince =

Barbadian hurdler

Personal information
- Born: 11 November 1967 (age 58) Barbados
- Height: 178 cm (5 ft 10 in)
- Weight: 70 kg (154 lb)

Sport
- Country: Barbados
- Sport: Hurdling

Achievements and titles
- Personal best: 50.86

Allan Ince is a Barbadian Olympic hurdler. He represented his country in the men's 400 metres hurdles at the 1988 Summer Olympics. His time was a 52.76 in the hurdles. He also competed in the Men's 4 × 400 metres relay, where his team finished with a time of 3:06.03 in the qualifiers, and a 3:06.93 in the semifinals.
