= Michel Zimmermann =

Belgian hurdler

Personal information
- Nationality: Belgian
- Born: 1 January 1960 (age 66)

Sport
- Sport: Track and field
- Event: 400 metres hurdles

Michel Zimmermann (born 1 January 1960) is a Belgian hurdler. He competed in the men's 400 metres hurdles at the 1984 Summer Olympics, where he finished seventh.

The Belgian tennis player Kimberley Zimmermann is his daughter.
