= Uwe Ackermann =

East German hurdler

Personal information
- Nationality: East German
- Born: September 12, 1960 (age 65) Zwickau, Bezirk Karl-Marx-Stadt, East Germany

Sport
- Sport: Athletics
- Event: 400 metres hurdles
- Club: SC Karl-Marx-Stadt

Achievements and titles
- Personal best: 48.50 s (1982)
Medal record
Men's athletics
Representing East Germany
European Championships
Bronze medal – third place	1982 Athens	400 m hurdles

Uwe Ackermann (born 12 September 1960) is a retired East German hurdler.

He won the bronze medal at the 1982 European Championships with 48.64 seconds.

His personal best time was 48.50 seconds, achieved in July 1982 in Karl-Marx-Stadt. This ranks him fourth among German 400 m hurdlers, behind Harald Schmid, Olaf Hense and Edgar Itt.

Uwe Ackermann represented the sports team SC Karl-Marx-Stadt and became East German champion in 1982, 1987 and 1988.
