= Jozef Kucej =

Slovak hurdler

Personal information
- Born: 23 March 1965 (age 61) Zvolen, Czechoslovakia
- Height: 1.81 m (5 ft 11 in)
- Weight: 72 kg (159 lb)

Sport
- Sport: Track and field
- Event: 400 metres hurdles
- Club: Dukla Banská Bystrica

Jozef Kucej (born 23 March 1965 in Zvolen, Czechoslovakia) is a retired Slovak athlete who specialised in the 400 metres hurdles. He represented Czechoslovakia and later Slovakia at three consecutive Olympic Games, starting in 1988. In addition, he competed at four World Championships.

His personal best in the event is 48.94 seconds (Prague 1989). This is the current Slovak records.

== Competition record ==
Year	Competition	Venue	Position	Event	Notes
Representing Czechoslovakia
1986	European Championships	Stuttgart, West Germany	13th (sf)	400 m hurdles	50.42
1987	Universiade	Zagreb, Yugoslavia	11th (sf)	400 m hurdles	50.23
1987	World Championships	Rome, Italy	36th (h)	400 m hurdles	51.13
1987	World Championships	Rome, Italy	18th (h)	4 × 400 m relay	3:05.44
1988	Olympic Games	Seoul, South Korea	12th (h)	400 m hurdles	49.89
1989	World Cup	Barcelona, Spain	4th	400 m hurdles	49.73^{1}
1990	European Championships	Split, Yugoslavia	13th (sf)	400 m hurdles	50.52
1991	World Championships	Tokyo, Japan	20th (h)	400 m hurdles	49.93
1992	Olympic Games	Barcelona, Spain	28th (h)	400 m hurdles	50.28
Representing Slovakia
1993	World Championships	Stuttgart, Germany	31st (h)	400 m hurdles	50.18
1994	European Championships	Helsinki, Finland	11th (sf)	400 m hurdles	49.75
1995	World Championships	Gothenburg, Sweden	26th (h)	400 m hurdles	50.00
1996	Olympic Games	Atlanta, United States	39th (h)	400 m hurdles	50.31

^{1}Representing Europe
