= Pierre Leveille =

Canadian hurdler (born 1962)

Personal information
- Nationality: Canadian
- Born: 19 February 1962 (age 64) Sainte-Anne-des-Plaines, Quebec, Canada

Sport
- Sport: Track and field
- Event: 400 metres hurdles

Pierre Leveille (born 19 February 1962) is a Canadian hurdler. He competed in the men's 400 metres hurdles at the 1984 Summer Olympics.
