= Ken Gray (athlete) =

Jamaican hurdler

Personal information
- Nationality: Jamaican
- Born: 9 December 1962 (age 63)

Sport
- Sport: Track and field
- Event: 400 metres hurdles

Ken Gray (born 9 December 1962) is a Jamaican hurdler. He competed in the men's 400 metres hurdles at the 1984 Summer Olympics.

Gray competed for the Florida Gators track and field team in the NCAA.
