= Eric Spence =

Canadian hurdler

Personal information
- Nationality: Canadian
- Born: 18 April 1961 (age 65) Kingston, Jamaica

Sport
- Sport: Track and field
- Event: 110 metres hurdles

Eric Spence (born 18 April 1961) is a Canadian hurdler. He competed in the men's 110 metres hurdles at the 1984 Summer Olympics.
