= Hwang Hong-chul =

South Korean sprinter (born 1966)

Personal information
- Nationality: South Korean
- Born: 27 February 1966 (age 60)

Sport
- Sport: Sprinting
- Event: 4 × 400 metres relay
Medal record
Men's athletics
Representing South Korea
Asian Championships
Gold medal – first place	1989 New Delhi	400 m hurdles

Hwang Hong-chul (born 27 February 1966) is a South Korean sprinter. He competed in the men's 4 × 400 metres relay at the 1988 Summer Olympics.

Hwang won the 400 metres hurdles at the 40th South Korean Athletics Championships, running 51.12 seconds. The time served as a South Korean national record.
