= Franck Jonot =

French hurdler

Personal information
- Nationality: French
- Born: 1 April 1961 (age 65) Suresnes, France

Sport
- Sport: Track and field
- Event: 400 metres hurdles

Franck Jonot (born 1 April 1961) is a French hurdler. He competed in the men's 400 metres hurdles at the 1984 Summer Olympics.
