= David Kitur =

Kenyan sprinter (born 1962)

Medal record

Men's athletics

Representing Kenya

African Championships
Gold medal – first place	1985 Cairo	4×400 m
Silver medal – second place	1990 Cairo	400 m
Bronze medal – third place	1985 Cairo	400 m

David Kitur (born October 12, 1962) is a retired Kenyan runner, who specialised in 400 metres.

In 1983, at the inaugural world championships he was part of the Kenyan 4x400 metres relay team, which reached semifinals.

He competed at the 1984 Summer Olympics, in 400 metres and 4x400 metres race, reaching semifinals in both. He won bronze over 400 metres at the 1985 African Championships in Athletics, and may have been part of the 4 × 400 m relay team that won gold.

At the 1987 All-Africa Games, held in Nairobi, Kenya, he finished second behind Innocent Egbunike of Nigeria. He finished sixth in the 400 metres race at the 1987 World Championships. The Kenyan 4 × 400 m relay team, which he was part of, finished 5th.

At the 1990 African Championships in Athletics 400 metres race he finished second behind his younger brother Samson Kitur. The same year, at the 1990 Commonwealth Games, he was part of the Kenyan 4x400 metres relay team that won Gold.

Having missed the 1988 Summer Olympics, he competed at the Olympics for a second time in 1992. He reached quarterfinals in 400 metres race, where his brother Samson Kitur won bronze. He competed for the Kenyan 4x400 metres relay team in heats and semifinal, helping it to reach the final. In the final he was replaced by Abednego Matilu, but the Kenyan team did not finish the final.

He is a three-times Kenyan champions over 400 metres (1984, 1985, 1990).

After retirement, he has been a coach.

Two of his brothers were also Olympic athletes, Samson Kitur and Simon Kitur.

== Achievements ==
Year	Competition	Venue	Position	Event	Notes
Representing Kenya
1987	All-Africa Games	Nairobi, Kenya	2nd	400 m	44.93
