= Edwin Moses =

American track and field athlete (born 1955)

Edwin Moses OLY
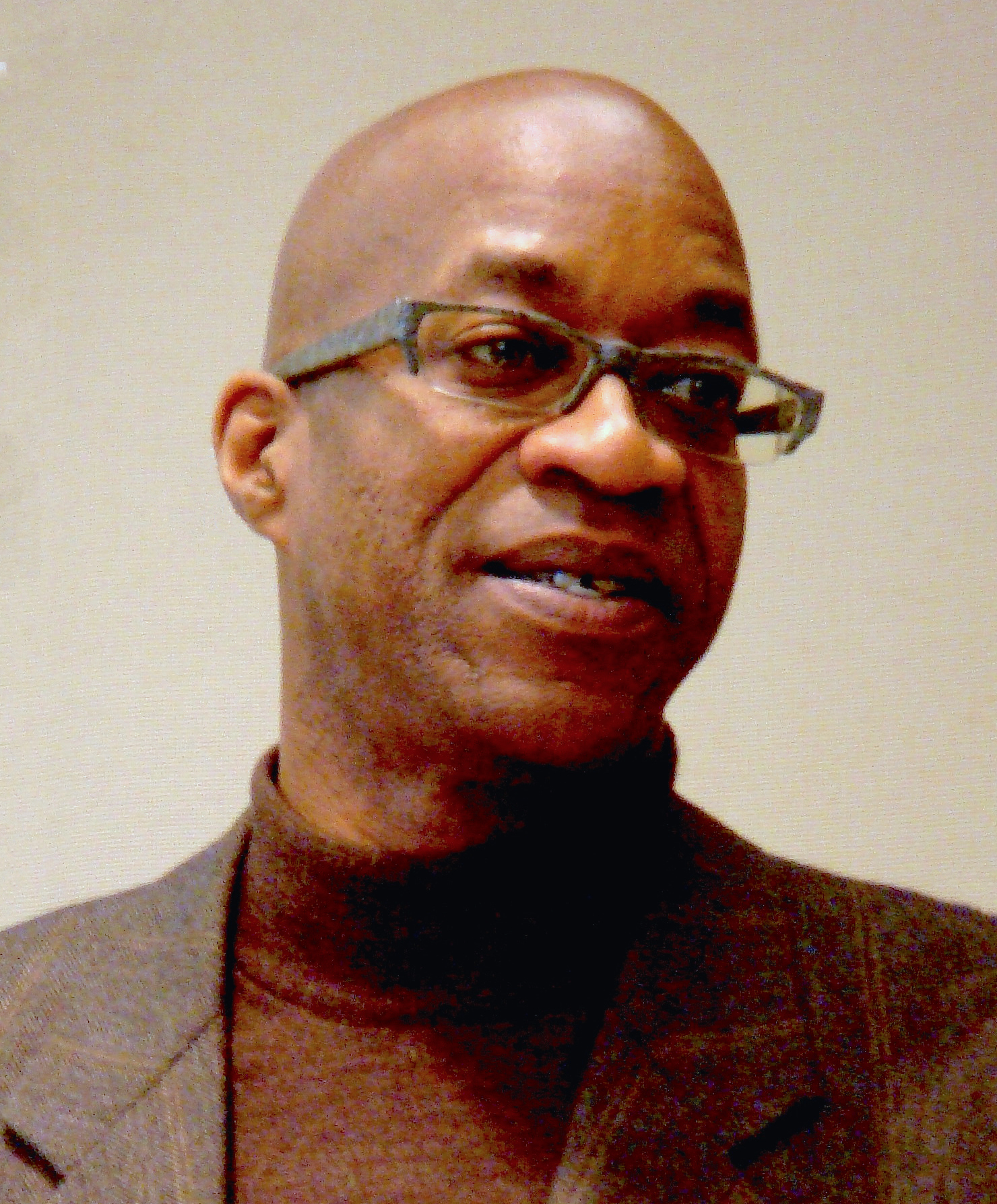
- Moses in 2008

Personal information
- Full name: Edwin Corley Moses
- Born: August 31, 1955 (age 71) Dayton, Ohio, U.S.
- Height: 6 ft 2 in (188 cm)
- Weight: 180 lb (82 kg)

Sport
- Sport: Track and Field
- Event: Hurdles
- Club: Morehouse College; Team adidas

Achievements and titles
- Personal bests: 110 mH – 13.64 (1978); 400 mH – 47.02 (1983); 400 m – 45.60 (1977)
Medal record
Men's athletics
Representing the United States
Event	1st	2nd	3rd
Olympic Games	2	0	1
World Championships	2	0	0
IAAF World Cup	3	0	0
Goodwill Games	1	0	0
Total	8	0	1
Olympic Games
Gold medal – first place	1976 Montreal	400 m hurdles
Gold medal – first place	1984 Los Angeles	400 m hurdles
Bronze medal – third place	1988 Seoul	400 m hurdles
World Championships
Gold medal – first place	1983 Helsinki	400 m hurdles
Gold medal – first place	1987 Rome	400 m hurdles
IAAF World Cup
Gold medal – first place	1977 Düsseldorf	400 m hurdles
Gold medal – first place	1979 Montreal	400 m hurdles
Gold medal – first place	1981 Rome	400 m hurdles
Goodwill Games
Gold medal – first place	1986 Moscow	400 m hurdles

Edwin Corley Moses (born August 31, 1955) is an American former hurdler who won gold medals in the 400 m hurdles at the 1976 and 1984 Olympics. Between 1977 and 1987, Moses won 107 consecutive finals (122 consecutive races) and set the world record in the event four times. In addition to his running achievements, Moses was also an innovative reformer in the areas of Olympic eligibility and drug testing. In 2000, he was elected the first Chairman of the Laureus World Sports Academy, an international service organization of world-class athletes.

== Early life and education ==
Moses was born in Dayton, Ohio. His parents were educators, and his father was a Tuskegee Airman. In 1973 he matriculated at Morehouse College in Atlanta, Georgia, where he majored in physics and industrial engineering while competing for the school track team. Moses received an MBA from Pepperdine University in 1994.

== Competition in 400 m hurdles ==
Morehouse did not have its own track, so as a student athlete in college Moses used public high school facilities around the city to train and run. Initially, Moses competed mostly in the 120-yard hurdles and 440-yard dash; before March 1976, he ran only one 400 m hurdles race. But once he began focusing on the event he quickly found success. With his height of 6'2", Moses' trademark technique was to take a consistent 13 steps between each of the hurdles, pulling away in the second half of the race as his rivals often took 15 strides or changed their stride pattern. He qualified for the U.S. team for the 1976 Summer Olympics in Montreal. In his first international meet, Moses won the gold medal ahead of teammate Mike Shine, setting a world record of 47.63 seconds in the process.

After breaking his own world record the following year at Drake Stadium with a time of 47.45 seconds, Moses lost to West Germany's Harald Schmid on August 26, 1977, in Berlin; this was his fourth defeat in the 400 m hurdles. Beginning the next week, Moses beat Schmid by 15 metres (49 ft) in Düsseldorf, and he did not lose another race for nine years, nine months, and nine days. Moses qualified for the 1980 U.S. Olympic team but was unable to compete due to the 1980 Summer Olympics boycott. He did however receive one of 461 Congressional Gold Medals created for the athletes. At the 1984 Olympics held in Los Angeles, Moses was selected to recite the Olympic Oath. He went on to win his second Olympic gold medal.

By the time American Danny Harris beat Moses in Madrid on June 4, 1987, Moses had won 122 consecutive races, set the world record twice more, won three World Cup titles, a World Championship gold, as well as his two Olympic gold medals. After the loss to Harris, he went on to win 10 more races in a row, collecting his second world gold in Rome in August of the same year.

Moses finished third in the final 400 m hurdles race of his career at the 1988 Summer Olympics in Seoul.

== Eligibility reforms ==
In 1979 Moses took a leave of absence from his job with General Dynamics to devote himself to running full-time. In the next two years, he was instrumental in reforming international and Olympic eligibility rules. At his urging, an Athletes Trust Fund program was established to allow athletes to benefit from government- or privately supplied stipends, direct payments, and commercial endorsement money without jeopardizing their Olympic eligibility. Moses presented the plan to Juan Antonio Samaranch, President of the International Olympic Committee, and the concept was ratified in 1981. This fund is the basis of many Olympic athlete subsistence, stipend and corporate support programs, including the United States Olympic Committee's Direct Athlete Assistance Programs.

== Awards ==
Despite the U.S.-led boycott that kept him from competing at the summer games in Moscow, Moses was the 1980 Track & Field News Athlete of the Year. A year later, he became the first recipient of USA Track & Field's Jesse Owens Award as outstanding U.S. track and field performer for 1981. He received the Amateur Athletic Union's James E. Sullivan Award as outstanding amateur athlete in the United States in 1983. He was being named as ABC's Wide World of Sports Athlete of the Year in 1984. Moses also shared the Sports Illustrated Sportsman of the Year with American gymnast Mary Lou Retton in 1984, the same year he took the Athlete's Oath for the 1984 Summer Olympics.

In 1984 his hometown of Dayton renamed Miami Boulevard West and Sunrise Avenue "Edwin C. Moses Boulevard". In 1999, Moses ranked #47 on ESPN's SportCentury 50 Greatest Athletes.

In 2018, Moses received the Laureus Lifetime Achievement Award.

== Drug testing ==
As a sports administrator, Moses participated in the development of a number of anti-drug policies and helped the track and field community develop one of sports' most stringent random in-competition drug testing systems. In December 1988 he designed and created amateur sports' first random out-of-competition drug testing program. A physicist, Moses has been a leader in creating a structure and protocols that have significantly reduced the use of illegal, performance-enhancing pharmaceuticals in athletics for many decades.

== Other achievements ==
After his retirement from track, Moses competed in a 1990 World Cup bobsled race at Winterberg, Germany. He and long-time US Olympian Brian Shimer won the two-man bronze medal.

In 1994, he was inducted into the National Track and Field Hall of Fame.

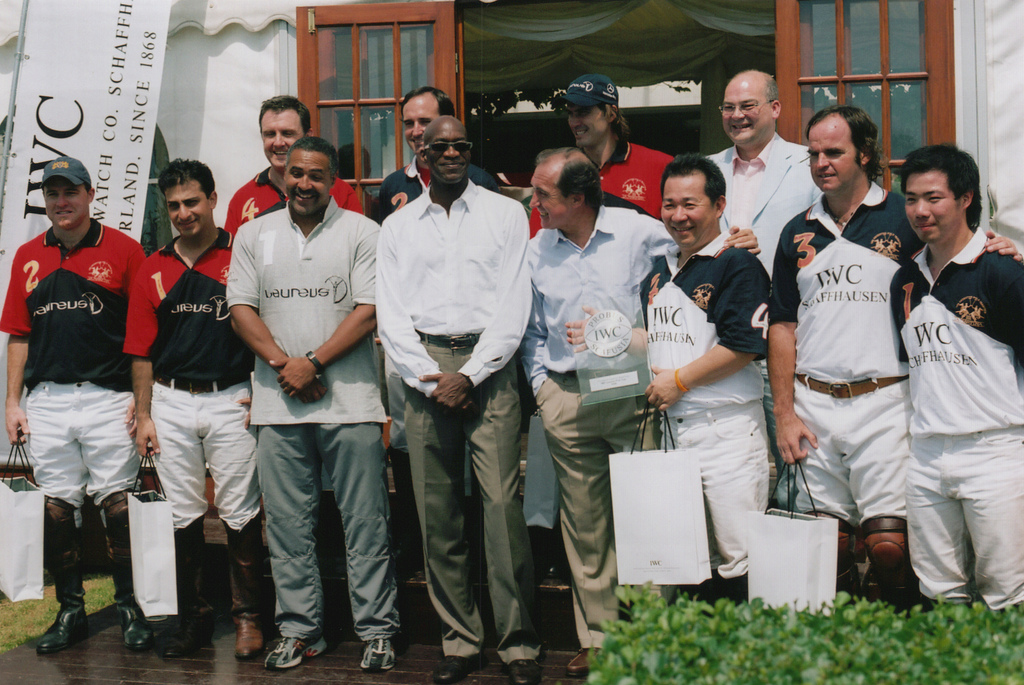
Moses (fourth from left) stood next to Daley Thompson at the 2006 Laureus Day held at the Ham Polo Club, London

Since election in 2000, Moses has been chairman of the Laureus World Sports Academy, which seeks "to promote and increase participation in sport at every level, and also to promote the use of sport as a tool for social change around the world". Several dozen Olympic and world champion athletes, through the Laureus Sports for Good Foundation, work to assist disadvantaged youths around the world.

In 2008, Moses presented the Dayton Literary Peace Prize's Lifetime Achievement Award to Martin Luther King Jr., biographer Taylor Branch.

In May 2009, the University of Massachusetts Boston awarded Moses an honorary doctorate for his efforts to maintain the integrity of Olympic sports and for his use of sports as a tool for positive social change.

The Edwin Moses Track at Morehouse's B. T. Harvey Stadium is named in his honour, he is the school's only alumnus to win an Olympic gold medal.

== Personal life ==
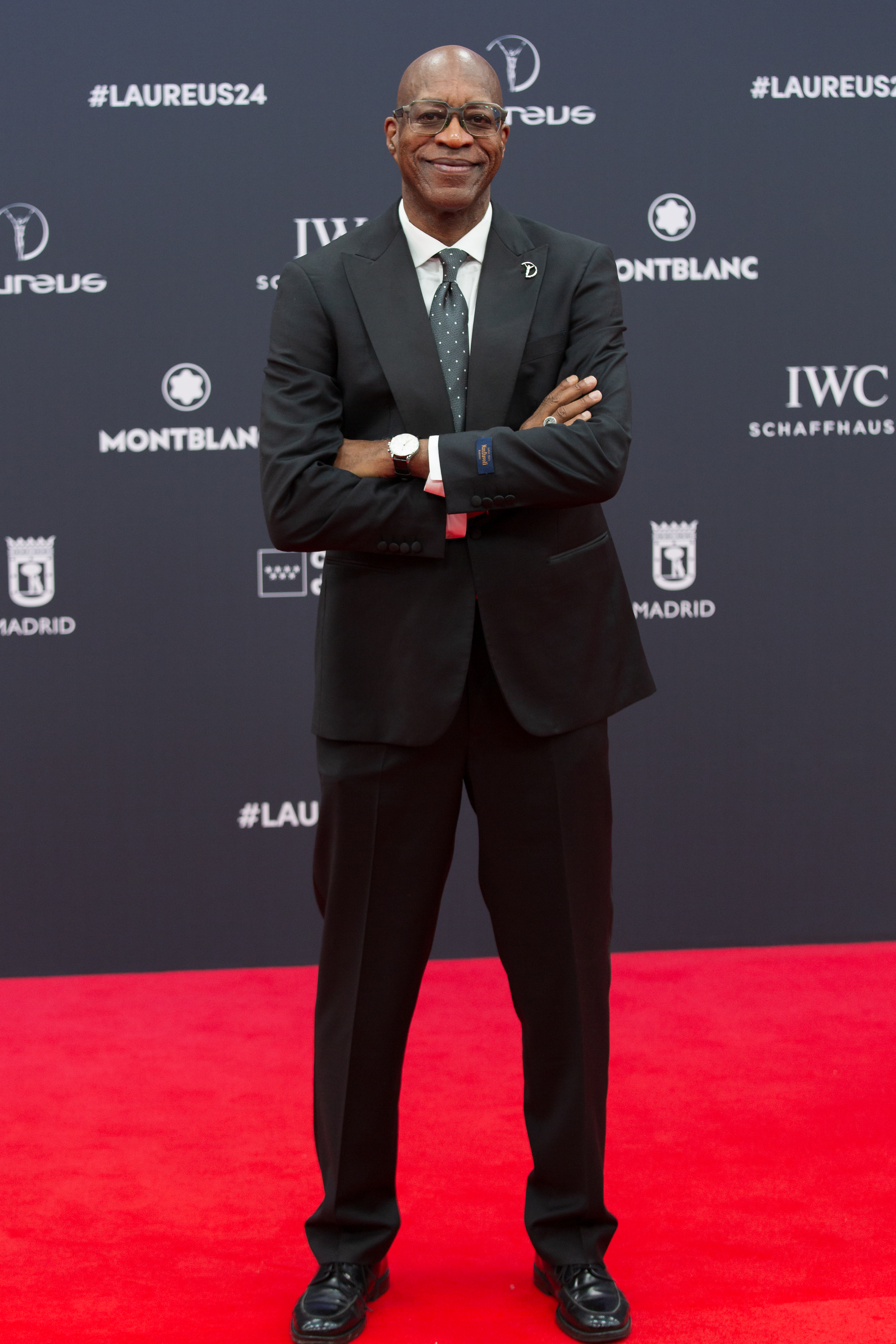
Edwin Moses in 2024 on the red carpet of the 2024 Laureus World Sports Awards.

Moses's father was a Tuskegee Airman.

Moses is a vegetarian, humanitarian and advocate for peace.

From 1986 through 1988, still in the prime of his running career, he suffered from an undiagnosed ruptured disc, discovered by MRI years later.

Moses has one son, Julian, a volleyball player, born on August 29, 1995, in southern California.

He married Myrella Bordt in 1982; they divorced in 1992. He married Michelle Moses in February 2007; she filed for divorce in 2016.

In 2017, Moses suffered two traumatic brain injuries within months, but recovered to be able to walk again.

== Film ==
- "Moses – 13 Steps" Documentary film, 2024 The premiere of the documentary film is scheduled for September 21, 2024 at Morehouse's Martin Luther King Jr. International Chapel.

Awards and achievements
Preceded by (United Kingdom) Sebastian Coe	Men's Track & Field Athlete of the Year; 1980	Succeeded by (United Kingdom) Sebastian Coe
Sporting positions
Preceded by (United States) Jim Bolding	Men's 400 m Hurdles Best Year Performance; 1976–1981	Succeeded by (West Germany) Harald Schmid
Preceded by (West Germany) Harald Schmid	Men's 400 m Hurdles Best Year Performance; 1983–1984	Succeeded by (United States) Danny Harris
Preceded by (United States) Danny Harris	Men's 400 m Hurdles Best Year Performance; 1986–1987	Succeeded by (United States) Andre Phillips
