= Samson Kitur =

Kenyan sprinter

Medal record

Men's athletics

Representing Kenya

Olympic Games
Bronze medal – third place	1992 Barcelona	400 m

World Championships
Silver medal – second place	1993 Stuttgart	4x400 m relay
Bronze medal – third place	1993 Stuttgart	400 m

All-Africa Games
Gold medal – first place	1991 Cairo	400 m
Gold medal – first place	1995 Harare	400 m

African Championships
Gold medal – first place	1990 Cairo	400 m

Samson Kitur (February 25, 1966 — April 25, 2003) was a Kenyan athlete, and an Olympic medalist in 1992.

== Biography ==
Unlike most of his compatriots, who run in distances 800 metres and up, Kitur specialised in the 400 metres. He won the continental championship in 1991, and the next year he took the bronze medal at the 1992 Summer Olympics, behind winner Quincy Watts. A year later, another bronze medal was his at the World Championships in Stuttgart.

He died suddenly of an unspecified illness at age 37 in his home in Eldoret, his home Kerotet Village near Ziwa.

Two of his brothers were also Olympic athletes: Simon Kitur and David Kitur.
