= Tranel Hawkins =

American hurdler

Tranel Hawkins (born 17 September 1962) is an American hurdler who competed in the 1984 Summer Olympics.

Hawkins was an All-American hurdler for the Angelo State Rams track and field team in the NCAA.
