= Martin Gillingham =

English sports commentator and journalist

Personal information
- Nationality: British (English)
- Born: 9 September 1963 (age 62) Leicester, England
- Height: 180 cm (5 ft 11 in)
- Weight: 74 kg (163 lb)

Sport
- Sport: Athletics
- Event: hurdles
- Club: Shaftesbury Barnet Harriers

Martin Charles Gillingham (born 9 September 1963) is an English sports commentator and journalist and former athlete, who competed at the 1984 Summer Olympics.

== Biography ==
Gillingham was educated at the Royal Grammar School, High Wycombe, later dropped out of Harvard University in the United States, before going to Carnegie College in Leeds.

He became the British 400 metres hurdles champion after winning the British AAA Championships title at the 1984 AAA Championships. Later that year he represented Great Britain at the 1984 Olympic Games in Los Angeles.

Three years later he competed in the same event at the IAAF World Championships in Rome. His best time was 49.82sec which he set in finishing third behind Edwin Moses and Kriss Akabusi in a Grand Prix meeting at Crystal Palace, London in July 1987.

In 1992, he moved to South Africa to be the athletics and Olympics correspondent for the Johannesburg Sunday Times. He later became a talkshow host on radio station Capetalk in Cape Town. In 2003, he returned to England after which he worked for five years on BBC Radio 5 Live presenting sports bulletins and reporting on rugby matches and had a brief stint as a presenter on Talksport. He is now heard as a rugby commentator on the Heineken Cup and the United Rugby Championship on ViaPlay. He was also a member of ITV's commentary team at numerous Rugby World Cups.

Gillingham provides expert analysis on French rugby, having worked for three seasons as lead commentator on ESPN's coverage of the Top 14 until they lost the rights at the end of the 2011/12 season. During the 2012/13 season his Top 14 commentary was heard on channels around the world including on Setanta Ireland, Premier Sports in the UK and SuperSport in Africa. The UK rights to French rugby moved to Sky Sports where he now commentates on the Top 14 matches.
