= Sven Nylander =

Swedish hurdler

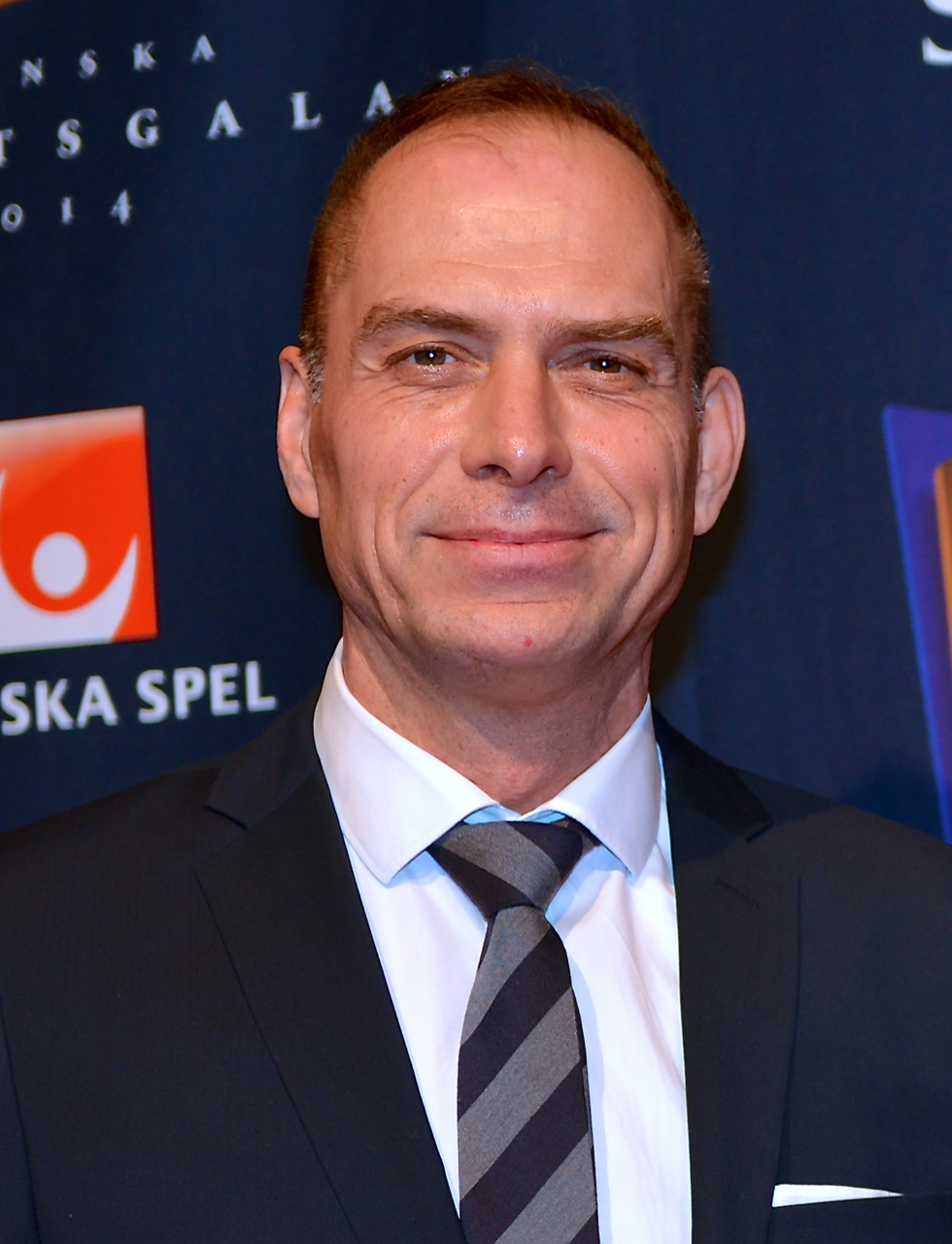
- Nylander in 2014

Personal information
- Nationality: Swedish
- Born: 1 January 1962 (age 64) Varberg, Sweden
- Height: 6 ft 4 in (1.93 m)
- Weight: 187 lb (85 kg)

Sport
- Country: Sweden
- Sport: Athletics (track and field)
- Event: Hurdles

Achievements and titles
- Olympic finals: 1984, 1996
- World finals: 1983, 1987, 1995
- Regional finals: 1982, 1986, 1990, 1994
- Personal best: 47.98
Medal record
Men's athletics
Representing Sweden
European Championships
Silver medal – second place	1990 Split	400 m hurdles
Silver medal – second place	1994 Helsinki	400 m hurdles
Bronze medal – third place	1986 Stuttgart	400 m hurdles

Sven Olof Nylander (born 1 January 1962) is a Swedish retired hurdler, who is best known for winning two silver medals at the European Championships in 1990 and 1994. He represented his native country in three Summer Olympics (1984, 1992 and 1996), and set his personal best (47.98 s) in the men's 400 metres hurdles on 1 August 1996 in Atlanta, Georgia.

Nylander finished fourth in four global championships (World Athletics Championships 1983 and 1987 - Olympic Games 1984 and 1996). He also finished fifth in the 1995 World Athletics Championship.

Nylander attended Southern Methodist University ("SMU") in Dallas, Texas, USA on an athletic scholarship, where he was a member of the SMU Mustangs track and field team.

During the European Championships in Gothenburg 2006, Nylander attended a party at a night club in central Gothenburg. He, former high jumper Patrik Sjöberg and sprinter Patrik Lövgren, were later stopped by the police and brought to the police station where they left urine samples, under suspicion of drug use. In interviews, Nylander at first claimed that he had not used narcotics. A couple of days later, Nylander confessed to having used cocaine during the party.

== International competitions ==
All results regarding 400 metres hurdles

Year	Competition	Venue	Position	Notes
Representing Sweden
1982	European Championships	Athens, Greece	7th	49.64
1983	World Championships	Helsinki, Finland	4th	48.97
1984	Olympic Games	Los Angeles, United States	4th	49.06
1986	European Championships	Stuttgart, Germany	3rd	49.38
1987	World Championships	Rome, Italy	4th	48.37
1990	European Championships	Split, Yugoslavia	2nd	48.43
1991	World Championships	Tokyo, Japan	9th (sf)	49.59
1992	Olympic Games	Barcelona, Spain	13th (sf)	49.64
1993	World Championships	Stuttgart, Germany	9th (sf)	49.21
1994	European Cup	Birmingham, England	1st	49.36
1994	European Championships	Helsinki, Finland	2nd	48.22
1995	European Cup	Villeneuve d'Ascq, France	3rd	49.64
1995	World Championships	Gothenburg, Sweden	5th	48.84
1996	European Cup	Madrid, Spain	3rd	50.18
1996	Olympic Games	Atlanta, United States	4th	47.98
(sf) Indicates overall position in semifinal round
