= Meshak Munyoro =

Kenyan hurdler

Personal information
- Nationality: Kenyan
- Born: 24 August 1958 (age 67)

Sport
- Sport: Track and field
- Event: 400 metres hurdles
Medal record
Men's athletics
Representing Kenya
African Championships
Bronze medal – third place	1982 Cairo	400 m hurdles

Meshak Munyoro (born 24 August 1958) is a Kenyan former hurdler. He competed in the men's 400 metres hurdles at the 1984 Summer Olympics at Los Angeles, USA.
