= Keter (name) =

Keter is a surname of Kenyan origin that may refer to:

- Charles Keter (born 1969), Kenyan politician and Member of the National Assembly
- Erick Keter (born 1966), Kenyan 400 metres hurdler
- Joseph Keter (born 1969), Kenyan steeplechase runner and 1996 Olympic champion

== See also ==
- Keter Betts (1928–2005), American jazz double bassist
- Kipketer, related name meaning "son of Keter"
