= Aleksandr Kharlov =

Soviet hurdler (born 1958)

Personal information
- Born: 18 March 1958 (age 68) Tashkent, Uzbek SSR, Soviet Union
Medal record
Men's Athletics
Representing the Soviet Union
World Championships
Bronze medal – third place	1983 Helsinki	400 m hurdles
Summer Universiade
Gold medal – first place	1983 Edmonton	400 m hurdles

Aleksandr Kharlov (Russian: Алекса́ндр Ха́рлов; born 18 March 1958) is a retired hurdler from the Soviet Union, best known for winning the bronze medal at the inaugural 1983 World Championships in the men's 400 m hurdles.

Kharlov competed at the 1980 Summer Olympics, where he was eliminated in the semifinals of the men's 400 m hurdles. He set his personal best (48.78 seconds) on 20 June 1983, at the Soviet Spartakiad, winning his only Soviet championship title; as of 2015, this time remains the Uzbekistani national record. Later that summer, he won gold at the Universiade in Edmonton, running 49.41 and defeating Senegal's Amadou Dia Ba by half a second. At the inaugural World Championships in Helsinki in August 1983 Kharlov won the bronze medal in 49.03; running in lane one, Kharlov was among the tail-enders for much of the race but finished fast, edging out Sweden's Sven Nylander (who also started slow) by 0.03 seconds.
