= Phil Beattie =

Hurdler from Northern Ireland

Philip Garth Beattie (born 8 September 1963) is a former hurdler from Northern Ireland. Born in Belfast, he won the gold medal in the 400 metres hurdles for Northern Ireland at the 1986 Commonwealth Games, and represented Great Britain at the 1984 Los Angeles Olympics.

== International competitions ==
Year	Competition	Venue	Position	Event	Notes
Representing Great Britain and Northern Ireland
1982	Commonwealth Games	Brisbane, Australia	10th (h)	400m hurdles	52.15
1984	Olympic Games	Los Angeles, United States	27th (h)	400m hurdles	51.27
1986	Commonwealth Games	Edinburgh, United Kingdom	1st	400m hurdles	49.60
1986	European Championships	Stuttgart, Germany	15th (sf)	400m hurdles	50.67 (50.00)
