= Simon Kitur =

Kenyan hurdler

Simon Kitur (born 12 June 1959) is a retired Kenyan athlete who specialized in the 400 metres hurdles.

He competed at the 1984 and 1988 Olympic Games as well as the 1987 World Championships, but without reaching the final.

His personal best time was 49.70 seconds, achieved in the heats of the 1984 Olympics.

Two of his brothers were also Olympic athletes: Samson Kitur and David Kitur.
