= Jasem Al-Dowaila =

Kuwaiti hurdler

Personal information
- Nationality: Kuwaiti
- Born: 9 March 1963 (age 62)

Sport
- Sport: Track and field
- Event: 400 metres hurdles

Jasem Al-Dowaila (born 9 March 1963) is a Kuwaiti hurdler. He competed in the 400 metres hurdles at the 1984 Summer Olympics and the 1988 Summer Olympics.
