= Aleksandr Yatsevich =

Personal information
- Born: September 8, 1956 (age 69)
Medal record
Men's athletics
Representing the Soviet Union
European Championships
Silver medal – second place	1982 Athens	400 m hurdles

Aleksandr Yatsevich (born September 8, 1956) is a retired hurdler from the Soviet Union, best known for winning the silver medal in the men's 400m hurdles at the 1982 European Championships in Athens, Greece.
