= Klaus Ehrle =

Austrian hurdler

Personal information
- Nationality: Austrian
- Born: 11 March 1966 (age 60)

Sport
- Sport: Track and field
- Event: 400 metres hurdles

Klaus Ehrle (born 11 March 1966) is an Austrian hurdler. He competed in the men's 400 metres hurdles at the 1988 Summer Olympics.
