= Toma Tomov =

Bulgarian athlete

Personal information
- Born: 21 May 1958 (age 68) Yambol, Bulgaria

Sport
- Sport: Track and field

Toma Tomov (Bulgarian: Тома Томов, born 21 May 1958) is a retired Bulgarian athlete who specialized in the 400 metres hurdles.

== International competitions ==
Year	Competition	Venue	Position	Notes
Representing Bulgaria
1982	European Championships	Athens, Greece	8th	50.10
1983	World Championships	Helsinki, Finland	DNF (semis)	50.23 (heats)
1984	Friendship Games	Moscow, Soviet Union	3rd	49.29
1984	Balkan Games	Athens, Greece	1st	49.54
1985	Balkan Games	Stara Zagora, Bulgaria	1st	49.73
1986	Goodwill Games	Moscow, Soviet Union	6th	49.08
1986	European Championships	Stuttgart, West Germany	4th	49.62
1986	Balkan Games	Ljubljana, Yugoslavia	1st	49.40
1987	World Championships	Rome, Italy	semis	49.11
1988	Olympic Games	Seoul, South Korea	semis	48.90
