= Ian Newhouse =

Canadian hurdler (born 1956)

Personal information
- Born: 25 December 1956 (age 69) Edmonton, Alberta, Canada
- Height: 178 cm (5 ft 10 in)
- Weight: 70 kg (154 lb)

Sport
- Sport: Track and field
- Event: 400 metres hurdles

Ian Newhouse (born 25 December 1956) is a Canadian former hurdler. He competed in the men's 400 metres hurdles at the 1984 Summer Olympics.
