= Lloyd Guss =

Canadian hurdler (born 1959)

Personal information
- Nationality: Canadian
- Born: 22 January 1959 (age 67) Vancouver, British Columbia, Canada

Sport
- Sport: Track and field
- Event: 400 metres hurdles

Lloyd Guss (born 22 January 1959) is a Canadian hurdler. He competed in the men's 400 metres hurdles at the 1984 Summer Olympics. He also competed in the two-man and four-man bobsleigh at the 1988 Winter Olympics.

Competing for the California Golden Bears track and field team, Guss placed 7th in the 400 m hurdles at the 1982 NCAA Division I Outdoor Track and Field Championships.

== See also ==
- List of athletes who competed in both the Summer and Winter Olympic games
