= René Mélédjé =

Ivorian hurdler

Personal information
- Born: 5 June 1958 (age 68)

Sport
- Sport: Track and field
Medal record
Representing Ivory Coast
African Championships
Gold medal – first place	1985 Cairo	110 m hurdles
Bronze medal – third place	1985 Cairo	400 m hurdles
Summer Universiade
Bronze medal – third place	1985 Kobe	400 m hurdles

René Djédjémel Mélédjé (born 5 June 1958) is a retired Ivorian hurdler.

At the 1985 African Championships he won the 110 metres hurdles and finished third in the 400 metres hurdles. He won bronze medals in the 400 m hurdles at the 1985 Summer Universiade and in 110 m hurdles at the 1987 All-Africa Games.

He participated in 4 × 400 metres relay at the 1983 World Championships, the 1984 Summer Olympics, the 1987 World Championships and the 1988 Summer Olympics. His personal best time is 48.94 seconds, achieved in August 1986 in Zürich. This is the current national record.

== Achievements ==
Year	Competition	Venue	Position	Event	Notes
Representing Ivory Coast
1987	All-Africa Games	Nairobi, Kenya	3rd	110 m hurdles	14.30
