= Rik Tommelein =

Belgian hurdler

Personal information
- Nationality: Belgian
- Born: 1 November 1962 (age 63)

Sport
- Sport: Track and field
- Event: 400 metres hurdles

Rik Tommelein (born 1 November 1962) is a Belgian hurdler. He competed in the men's 400 metres hurdles at the 1984 Summer Olympics.
