= Amadou Dia Ba =

Senegalese athlete (born 1958)

Personal information
- Born: September 22, 1958 (age 67) Dakar, Senegal

Sport
- Sport: Track and field
Medal record
Representing Senegal
Olympic Games
Silver medal – second place	1988 Seoul	400 m hurdles
Summer Universiade
Silver medal – second place	1983 Edmonton	400 m hurdles
African Championships
Gold medal – first place	1982 Cairo	400 m
Gold medal – first place	1982 Cairo	400 m hurdles
Gold medal – first place	1984 Rabat	400 m hurdles
Gold medal – first place	1984 Rabat	4×400 m
Gold medal – first place	1985 Cairo	400 m hurdles
Gold medal – first place	1988 Annaba	400 m hurdles
Silver medal – second place	1982 Cairo	4×400 m
Silver medal – second place	1992 Belle Vue Harel	400 m hurdles
Bronze medal – third place	1985 Cairo	4×400 m

El Hadj Amadou Dia Bâ OLY (born September 22, 1958) is a retired Senegalese athlete who competed in the 400 metres hurdles. He won the 1988 Olympic silver medal in this event with a personal best time of 47.23 seconds. It was the first, and only (as 2024) Olympic medal for Senegal. He competed in three consecutive Summer Olympics for his native country, starting in 1984.

== Achievements ==
Year	Competition	Venue	Position	Event	Notes
Representing Senegal
1978	All-Africa Games	Algiers, Algeria	3rd	High Jump	2.08
1982	African Championships	Cairo, Egypt	1st	400 m	45.80s
1982	African Championships	Cairo, Egypt	1st	400 m hurdles	49.55s
1983	Summer Universiade	Edmonton, Canada	2nd	400 m hurdles	
1983	World Championships	Helsinki, Finland	7th	400 m hurdles	49.61
1984	African Championships	Rabat, Morocco	1st	4X400 m	3.04.80s
1984	African Championships	Rabat, Morocco	1st	400 m hurdles	49.30s
1984	Olympic Games	Los Angeles, USA	5th	400 m hurdles	49.28
1985	African Championships	Cairo, Egypt	1st	400 m hurdles	48.29 CR
1987	World Championships	Rome, Italy	5th	400 m hurdles	48.37
1987	All-Africa Games	Nairobi, Kenya	1st	400 m hurdles	48.03 CR
1988	Olympic Games	Seoul, South Korea	2nd	400 m hurdles	47.23 NR
1988	African Championships	Annaba, Algeria	1st	400 m hurdles	48.81
1989	Jeux de la Francophonie	Casablanca, Morocco	1st	400 m hurdles	49.47 CR

As of 20 November 2024, Dia Ba holds five track records for the 400 metres hurdles set over the period August 1985 to September 1989. These include the track records for Manresa (48.69) and Nairobi (48.03).
