= Shigenori Omori =

Japanese sprinter (born 1960)

Personal information
- Nationality: Japanese
- Born: 9 July 1960 (age 65) Nanao, Ishikawa, Japan
- Height: 185 cm (6 ft 1 in)
- Weight: 76 kg (168 lb)

Sport
- Sport: Athletics
- Event: Sprinting / 400m
- Club: Waseda University
Medal record
Representing Japan
Asian Games
| Gold medal – first place | 1982 New Delhi | 4x400m relay |
| Silver medal – second place | 1982 New Delhi | 400m hurdles |

Shigenori Omori (大森 重宜, Ōmori Shigenori; born 9 July 1960) is a Japanese sprinter. He competed in the men's 4 × 400 metres relay at the 1984 Summer Olympics.

Omori finished third behind James King in the 400 metres hurdles event at the British 1982 AAA Championships.
