= Athanassios Kalogiannis =

Greek hurdler (1965–2017)

Personal information
- Nationality: Greek
- Born: 10 September 1965 Volos, Greece
- Died: 23 October 2017 (aged 52) Athens, Greece
- Height: 193 cm (6 ft 4 in)
- Weight: 80 kg (176 lb)

Sport
- Country: Greece
- Sport: Hurdling

Achievements and titles
- Personal best: 48.80
Medal record
Representing Greece
Summer Universiade
Silver medal – second place	1987 Zagreb	400m hurdles

Athanassios Kalogiannis (10 September 1965 – 23 October 2017) was a Greek Olympic hurdler. He represented his country in the men's 400 metres hurdles at the 1992 Summer Olympics, as well as in the men's 400 metres hurdles at the 1984 Summer Olympics. His time was a 51.27 in 1984, and a 49.52 in 1992.

After retiring from the sport, he worked as a fashion photographer. He died on 23 October 2017, from a pulmonary edema.
