= Henry Amike =

Nigerian hurdler

Personal information
- Nationality: Nigerian
- Born: 4 October 1961 (age 64) Lagos, Nigeria
- Height: 185 cm (6 ft 1 in)
- Weight: 71 kg (157 lb)

Sport
- Sport: Athletics
- Event: 400 m hurdles
- Club: All Star International, USA
Medal record
Men's athletics
Representing Nigeria
African Championships
Gold medal – first place	1989 Lagos	400 m hurdles
Silver medal – second place	1984 Rabat	400 m hurdles
Silver medal – second place	1984 Rabat	4×400 m
Silver medal – second place	1985 Cairo	400 m hurdles
Silver medal – second place	1985 Cairo	4×400 m
Silver medal – second place	1988 Annaba	400 m hurdles
Summer Universiade
Silver medal – second place	1985 Kobe	400 m hurdles

Henry Amike (born 4 October 1961) is a Nigerian retired athlete who specialized in the 400 metres hurdles who competed at the 1984 Summer Olympics and the 1988 Summer Olympics.

Amike competed for the Missouri Tigers track and field team in the NCAA.

Amike finished third behind Ahmed Hamada in the 400 metres hurdles event at the British 1985 AAA Championships.

== Achievements ==
Year	Competition	Venue	Position	Event	Notes
Representing Nigeria
1984	Olympic Games	Los Angeles, United States	8th	400 m hurdles	
1984	African Championships	Rabat, Morocco	2nd	400 m hurdles	
1984	Universiade	Kobe, Japan	2nd	400 m hurdles	
1984	African Championships	Cairo, Egypt	2nd	400 m hurdles	
1987	World Championships	Rome, Italy	6th	400 m hurdles	
1987	All-Africa Games	Nairobi, Kenya	3rd	400 m hurdles	
1988	African Championships	Annaba, Algeria	2nd	400 m hurdles	
1988	Olympic Games	Seoul, South Korea	7th	4 × 400 m relay	
1989	African Championships	Lagos, Nigeria	1st	400 m hurdles	
1989	World Cup	Barcelona, Spain	2nd	400 m hurdles	
