= Ahmed Ghanem =

Egyptian hurdler (born 1959)

Personal information
- Full name: Ahmed Abdelhalim Ghanem
- Nationality: Egyptian
- Born: 12 January 1959 (age 67)

Sport
- Sport: Track and field
- Event: 400 metres hurdles
Medal record
Men's athletics
Representing Egypt
African Championships
Silver medal – second place	1990 Cairo	400 m hurdles
Bronze medal – third place	1984 Rabat	400 m hurdles

Ahmed Abdelhalim Ghanem (Arabic: أحمد عبد الحليم غانم, born 12 January 1959) is an Egyptian hurdler. He competed in the 400 metres hurdles at the 1984 Summer Olympics and the 1988 Summer Olympics.
