= Ryoichi Yoshida =

Japanese sprinter (born 1965)

Personal information
- Nationality: Japanese
- Born: 2 March 1965 (age 61)

Sport
- Sport: Sprinting
- Event: 4 × 400 metres relay
Medal record
Representing Japan
Summer Universiade
Bronze medal – third place	1987 Zagreb	400m hurdles
Asian Games
Silver medal – second place	1986 Seoul	400m hurdles

Ryoichi Yoshida (吉田 良一, Yoshida Ryōichi; born 2 March 1965) is a Japanese sprinter. He competed in the men's 4 × 400 metres relay at the 1984 Summer Olympics.
