= Thomas Nyberg =

Swedish sprinter

Personal information
- Nationality: Swedish
- Born: 17 April 1962 (age 64)

Sport
- Sport: Sprinting
- Event: 4 × 400 metres relay

Thomas Nyberg (born 17 April 1962) is a Swedish sprinter. He competed in the men's 4 × 400 metres relay at the 1984 Summer Olympics.
