= Rok Kopitar =

Slovenian athlete (born 1959)

Personal information
- Born: May 5, 1959 (age 67) Celje, Yugoslavia

Sport
- Sport: Track and field
Medal record
Representing Yugoslavia
Mediterranean Games
Gold medal – first place	1979 Split	400m hurdles
Silver medal – second place	1979 Split	4x400m relay

Rok Kopitar (born May 5, 1959) is a former Slovenian athlete who placed 5th in the 400 m hurdles final at the 1980 Summer Olympics in Moscow, competing for Yugoslavia. He won a gold medal in the same event at the 1979 Mediterranean Games in Split.

Kopitar's personal best over 400 m hurdles was 49.11 s, set in 1980, and still standing as a Slovenian national record as of 2008.
