= Georgios Vamvakas =

Greek hurdler

Giorgos Vamvakas
Personal information
- Full name: Georgios Vamvakas
- Nationality: Greek
- Born: 1 January 1960 (age 66)

Sport
- Sport: Track and field
- Event: 400 metres hurdles

Georgios Vamvakas (Greek: Γεώργιος Βαμβακάς; born 1 January 1960) is a Greek hurdler. He competed in the men's 400 metres hurdles at the 1984 Summer Olympics.
