= Thomas Futterknecht =

Austrian hurdler

Personal information
- Nationality: Austrian
- Born: 24 December 1962 (age 63) Sankt Pölten, Austria

Sport
- Sport: Track and field
- Event: 400 metres hurdles

Thomas Futterknecht (born 24 December 1962) is an Austrian hurdler. He competed in the men's 400 metres hurdles at the 1984 Summer Olympics.
