= Harald Schmid =

German track and field athlete

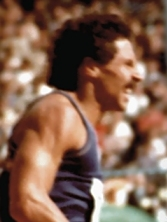
- Harald Schmid (1981)

Personal information
- Born: 29 September 1957 (age 68) Hanau, West Germany
- Height: 1.87 m (6 ft 2 in)
- Weight: 82 kg (181 lb)

Sport
- Sport: Track and field
- Events: 400 metres hurdles; 4 × 400 metres relay
Medal record
Men's athletics
Representing West Germany
Olympic Games
Bronze medal – third place	1976 Montreal	4 × 400 m relay
Bronze medal – third place	1984 Los Angeles	400 m hurdles
World Championships
Silver medal – second place	1983 Helsinki	400 m hurdles
Silver medal – second place	1983 Helsinki	4 × 400 m relay
Bronze medal – third place	1987 Rome	400 m hurdles
European Championships
Gold medal – first place	1978 Prague	400 m hurdles
Gold medal – first place	1978 Prague	4 × 400 m relay
Gold medal – first place	1982 Athens	400 m hurdles
Gold medal – first place	1982 Athens	4 × 400 m relay
Gold medal – first place	1986 Stuttgart	400 m hurdles
Silver medal – second place	1986 Stuttgart	4 × 400 m relay
IAAF World Cup
Gold medal – first place	1977 Düsseldorf	4 × 400 m relay
Silver medal – second place	1979 Montreal	400 m hurdles
Bronze medal – third place	1977 Düsseldorf	400 m hurdles
Bronze medal – third place	1985 Canberra	400 m hurdles
Summer Universiade
Gold medal – first place	1979 Mexico City	400 m

Harald Schmid (German pronunciation: [ˈha.ʁalt ˈʃmɪt]; born 29 September 1957) is a retired German track and field athlete who competed in the sprints and hurdles. He was one of the best 400 metres hurdles runners in the world during his career.

== Career ==
Schmid won bronze with the West German 4 × 400 m relay team at the 1976 Summer Olympics in Montreal as well as an individual bronze in the 400 m hurdles at the 1984 Summer Olympics in Los Angeles in 1984.

In addition, he won silver at the 1983 World Championships in the 400 m hurdles and the 4 × 400 m relay and a further bronze in 400 m hurdles at the 1987 World Championships. At the latter, he finished only 0.02 s behind the gold medalist Edwin Moses; Schmid's duels with Moses during the late 1970s and early 1980s were famous and Schmid was the last person to beat Moses before his streak of 122 consecutive victories. Moses said of him: "I would wake up at the morning, and in California we’re about nine hours behind Germany. I’d say to myself, ‘Harald has probably finished his workout by now, I need to get busy!’ Guys like him were my motivation."

Schmid also won gold at the European Championships 5 times (3 individual and 2 team medals) and one silver with the team.

His personal best in the 400 m hurdles was 47.48 s (achieved twice: in 1982 and at the World Championships in 1987), which at one point was the European record and the second fastest time ever.

In 2016, he was inducted into Germany's Sports Hall of Fame.

== Personal life ==
Schmid has a PhD in Sports Science and was appointed to the IAAF athletes commission in 1999. He participates actively in anti-drug campaigns and encourages children's sport activities.

Awards
Preceded by Boris Becker; Eberhard Gienger	German Sportsman of the Year; 1979; 1987	Succeeded by Michael Groß; Guido Kratschmer
Sporting positions
Preceded by Edwin Moses	Men's 400 m hurdles season's best 1982	Succeeded by Edwin Moses
