= Athletics at the 1995 Summer Universiade – Men's 400 metres hurdles =

The men's 400 metres hurdles event at the 1995 Summer Universiade was held on 30–31 August at the Hakatanomori Athletic Stadium in Fukuoka, Japan.

== Medalists ==
Gold	Silver	Bronze
Kazuhiko Yamazaki; Japan	Octavius Terry; United States	Yoshihiko Saito; Japan

== Results ==
=== Heats ===
Qualification: First 2 of each heat (Q) and the next 4 fastest (q) qualified for the semifinals.

Rank	Heat	Athlete	Nationality	Time	Notes
1	1	Yoshihiko Saito	Japan	49.53	Q
2	5	Octavius Terry	United States	49.49	Q
3	5	Pedro Rodrigues	Portugal	49.74	Q
4	5	Gary Jennings	Great Britain	49.82	q
4	6	Kazuhiko Yamazaki	Japan	49.82	Q
6	3	Jean-Paul Bruwier	Belgium	49.90	Q
7	3	Patrick Ottoz	Italy	49.96	Q
8	3	Vadim Zadoinov	Moldova	49.96	q
9	2	Mircea Mateescu	Romania	50.09	Q
10	3	Dusán Kovács	Hungary	50.10	q
11	4	Oscar Pitillas	Spain	50.15	Q
12	2	Carlos Silva	Portugal	50.30	Q
13	4	Oleg Tverdokhleb	Ukraine	50.34	Q
14	2	Paweł Januszewski	Poland	50.45	q
15	4	Michael Kaul	Germany	50.55	
16	3	Antony Williams	Great Britain	50.73	
17	5	Jimmy Coco	France	50.87	
18	6	Ryan Hayden	United States	50.89	Q
19	3	Michel Genest-Lahaye	Canada	51.01	
20	4	Stéphane Traversini	France	51.15	
21	1	Gennadiy Gorbenko	Ukraine	51.27	Q
22	6	Mitchel Francis	Jamaica	51.37	
23	4	Johann Steynberg	South Africa	51.48	
24	5	Ouahid Ketite	Algeria	51.62	
25	5	Robert Lungu	Romania	51.66	
26	5	Johnathan Schmiot	New Zealand	51.69	
27	6	Petteri Pulkkinen	Finland	51.75	
28	2	Olaf Hense	Germany	52.02	
29	6	Chris Carroll	Australia	52.26	
30	6	Francisco Lima	Brazil	52.31	
31	1	Piotr Kotlarski	Poland	52.41	
32	2	Lee Jung-ho	South Korea	52.79	
33	4	Jason McKissock	Canada	52.87	
34	1	Cleverson da Silva	Brazil	53.46	
35	4	Grant Coutts	New Zealand	54.22	
36	6	Iñigo Monreal	Spain	54.45	
37	1	Lawrence Anthonipillai	Sri Lanka	56.73	
38	2	Tham Kin Loong	Singapore	57.12	
39	3	Wong Pui Hung	Hong Kong	57.30	
	1	Sergey Podrez	Russia	DNF	
	1	Paolo Bellino	Italy	DNS	
	2	Egīls Tēbelis	Latvia	DNS	

=== Semifinals ===
Qualification: First 4 of each semifinal qualified directly (Q) for the final.

Rank	Heat	Athlete	Nationality	Time	Notes
1	2	Kazuhiko Yamazaki	Japan	48.83	Q
2	2	Gennadiy Gorbenko	Ukraine	48.92	Q
3	2	Octavius Terry	United States	48.98	Q
4	2	Carlos Silva	Portugal	49.40	Q
5	1	Yoshihiko Saito	Japan	49.44	Q
6	2	Paweł Januszewski	Poland	49.64	
7	1	Dusán Kovács	Hungary	49.66	Q
8	1	Oleg Tverdokhleb	Ukraine	49.70	Q
9	1	Ryan Hayden	United States	49.77	Q
10	2	Mircea Mateescu	Romania	49.79	
11	1	Vadim Zadoinov	Moldova	49.84	
12	1	Jean-Paul Bruwier	Belgium	50.06	
13	1	Oscar Pitillas	Spain	50.10	
14	2	Patrick Ottoz	Italy	50.13	
15	1	Pedro Rodrigues	Portugal	50.56	
16	2	Gary Jennings	Great Britain	51.22	

=== Final ===
Rank	Lane	Athlete	Nationality	Time	Notes
1st place, gold medalist(s)	6	Kazuhiko Yamazaki	Japan	48.58	
2nd place, silver medalist(s)	8	Octavius Terry	United States	48.95	
3rd place, bronze medalist(s)	3	Yoshihiko Saito	Japan	49.18	
4	5	Gennadiy Gorbenko	Ukraine	49.29	
5	4	Dusán Kovács	Hungary	49.35	
6	7	Ryan Hayden	United States	49.39	
7	1	Carlos Silva	Portugal	49.54	
	2	Oleg Tverdokhleb	Ukraine	DNF	
