= 1995 World Championships in Athletics – Men's 400 metres hurdles =

These are the official results of the Men's 400 metres Hurdles event at the 1995 IAAF World Championships in Gothenburg, Sweden. There were a total number of 54 participating athletes, with seven qualifying heats, two semi-finals and the final held on Thursday 1995-08-10.

== Final ==
RANK	FINAL	TIME
	Derrick Adkins (USA)	47.98
	Samuel Matete (ZAM)	48.03
	Stéphane Diagana (FRA)	48.14
4.	Ruslan Mashchenko (RUS)	48.83
5.	Sven Nylander (SWE)	48.84
6.	Ken Harnden (ZIM)	48.89
7.	Kazuhiko Yamazaki (JPN)	49.22
8.	Eronilde de Araújo (BRA)	49.86

== Semi-finals ==
- Held on Tuesday 1993-08-08

RANK	HEAT 1	TIME
1.	Derrick Adkins (USA)	48.25
2.	Stéphane Diagana (FRA)	48.37
3.	Ruslan Mashchenko (RUS)	48.75
4.	Eronilde de Araújo (BRA)	48.85
5.	Erick Keter (KEN)	49.53
6.	José Pérez (CUB)	50.20
—	Fabrizio Mori (ITA)	DSQ
—	Shunji Karube (JPN)	DSQ

RANK	HEAT 2	TIME
1.	Samuel Matete (ZAM)	48.50
2.	Sven Nylander (SWE)	48.53
3.	Kazuhiko Yamazaki (JPN)	48.64
4.	Ken Harnden (ZIM)	48.73
5.	Laurent Ottoz (ITA)	48.94
6.	Octavius Terry (USA)	49.49
7.	Dusán Kovács (HUN)	49.57
—	Winthrop Graham (JAM)	DSQ

== Qualifying heats ==
- Held on Monday 1995-08-07

RANK	HEAT 1	TIME
1.	Fabrizio Mori (ITA)	49.37
2.	Ken Harnden (ZIM)	49.65
3.	Niklas Wallenlind (SWE)	49.91
4.	Stephan Striezel (GER)	51.65
5.	Juan Vallin (MEX)	51.96
6.	Ibou Faye (SEN)	52.20
—	Oleh Tverdokhlib (UKR)	DNF
—	Salvador Vila (ESP)	DQ

RANK	HEAT 2	TIME
1.	Stéphane Diagana (FRA)	49.16
2.	Octavius Terry (USA)	49.43
3.	Carlos Silva (POR)	49.53
4.	Patrick Ottoz (ITA)	49.65
5.	Iñigo Monreal (ESP)	50.30
6.	Barnabas Kinyor (KEN)	50.91
—	Chanond Keanchan (THA)	DQ

RANK	HEAT 3	TIME
1.	Winthrop Graham (JAM)	49.15
2.	Erick Keter (KEN)	49.27
3.	Dusán Kovács (HUN)	49.30
4.	Rohan Robinson (AUS)	49.63
5.	Yoshihiko Saito (JPN)	49.91
6.	Hadi Soua'an Al-Somaily (KSA)	50.54
7.	Jean-Paul Bruwier (BEL)	50.96
—	Gary Jennings (GBR)	DQ

RANK	HEAT 4	TIME
1.	Laurent Ottoz (ITA)	48.90
2.	Sven Nylander (SWE)	49.10
3.	Miro Kocuvan (SLO)	49.45
4.	Jozef Kucej (SVK)	50.00
5.	Michael Kaul (GER)	50.23
6.	Vadim Zadoynov (MDA)	50.24
7.	Domingo Cordero (PUR)	50.42
8.	Judex Lefou (MRI)	51.46

RANK	HEAT 5	TIME
1.	Eronilde de Araújo (BRA)	48.84
2.	Shunji Karube (JPN)	49.07
3.	Gennadiy Gorbenko (UKR)	49.44
4.	Ryan Hayden (USA)	49.77
5.	Simon Hollingsworth (AUS)	50.66
6.	Hamadou Mbaye (SEN)	52.13
7.	Eric Krings (GUA)	53.78
—	Petteri Pulkkinen (FIN)	DQ

RANK	HEAT 6	TIME
1.	Kazuhiko Yamazaki (JPN)	48.37
2.	Samuel Matete (ZAM)	48.45
3.	Ruslan Mashchenko (RUS)	48.47
4.	Niklas Eriksson (SWE)	49.33
5.	Paweł Januszewski (POL)	49.43
6.	Oscar Pitillas (ESP)	51.28
7.	Mohamed Amin (PAK)	52.22
8.	Ilir Xhani (ALB)	52.61

RANK	HEAT 7	TIME
1.	Derrick Adkins (USA)	48.86
2.	José Pérez (CUB)	50.32
3.	Marc Dollendorf (BEL)	50.47
4.	Jimmy Coco (FRA)	50.80
5.	Olaf Hense (GER)	52.35
—	Gideon Biwott (KEN)	DQ
—	Gary Cadogan (GBR)	DQ

== See also ==
- 1992 Men's Olympic 400m Hurdles (Barcelona)
- 1994 Men's European Championships 400m Hurdles (Helsinki)
- 1996 Men's Olympic 400m Hurdles (Atlanta)
- 1998 Men's European Championships 400m Hurdles (Budapest)
