= 1997 World Championships in Athletics – Men's 400 metres hurdles =

These are the official results of the Men's 400 metres Hurdles event at the 1997 IAAF World Championships in Athens, Greece. There were a total number of 51 participating athletes, with seven qualifying heats, three semi-finals and the final held on Monday 4 August 1997.

== Final ==
RANK	FINAL	TIME
	Stéphane Diagana (FRA)	47.70
	Llewellyn Herbert (RSA)	47.86
	Bryan Bronson (USA)	47.88
4.	Fabrizio Mori (ITA)	48.05
5.	Samuel Matete (ZAM)	48.11
6.	Ruslan Mashchenko (RUS)	48.62
7.	Dinsdale Morgan (JAM)	49.06
8.	Jiří Mužík (CZE)	49.51

== Semi-finals ==
- Held on Sunday 1997-08-03

RANK	HEAT 1	TIME
1.	Stéphane Diagana (FRA)	48.14
2.	Llewellyn Herbert (RSA)	48.31
3.	Samuel Matete (ZAM)	48.44
4.	Mubarak Faraj Al-Nubi (QAT)	48.84
5.	Joey Woody (USA)	49.14
6.	Ian Weakley (JAM)	49.98
7.	Mustapha Sdad (MAR)	50.78
—	Kazuhiko Yamazaki (JPN)	DNF

RANK	HEAT 2	TIME
1.	Ruslan Mashchenko (RUS)	48.54
2.	Dinsdale Morgan (JAM)	48.56
3.	Shunji Karube (JPN)	48.81
4.	Paweł Januszewski (POL)	48.94
5.	Derrick Adkins (USA)	48.95
6.	Lukáš Souček (CZE)	49.09
7.	Hamed Ziad Abou (AUS)	49.12
8.	Ashraf Saber (ITA)	49.36

RANK	HEAT 3	TIME
1.	Bryan Bronson (USA)	47.83
2.	Fabrizio Mori (ITA)	48.17
3.	Jiří Mužík (CZE)	48.27
4.	Dusán Kovács (HUN)	48.45 (NR)
5.	Ken Harnden (ZIM)	48.82
6.	Yoshihiko Saito (JPN)	49.60
7.	Vadim Zadoynov (MDA)	50.07
8.	Kareem Archer (JAM)	50.76

== Qualifying heats ==
- Held on Saturday 1997-08-02

RANK	HEAT 1	TIME
1.	Llewellyn Herbert (RSA)	49.23
2.	Mubarak Faraj Al-Nubi (QAT)	49.39
3.	Ian Weakley (JAM)	49.52
4.	Marc Dollendorf (BEL)	49.66
5.	Tom McGuirk (IRL)	49.93
6.	Niklas Eriksson (SWE)	50.25
7.	Sinisa Pesa (YUG)	50.65

RANK	HEAT 2	TIME
1.	Fabrizio Mori (ITA)	48.93
2.	Lukas Soucek (CZE)	49.08
3.	Yoshihiko Saito (JPN)	49.52
4.	Jean-Paul Bruwier (BEL)	49.56
5.	Gary Jennings (GBR)	49.84
6.	Vladislav Shiryayev (RUS)	49.95
7.	Hubert Rakotombelontsoa (MAD)	52.29

RANK	HEAT 3	TIME
1.	Samuel Matete (ZAM)	48.43
2.	Jiri Muzik (CZE)	48.56
3.	Dinsdale Morgan (JAM)	49.34
4.	Mustapha Sdad (MAR)	49.50
5.	Chris Rawlinson (GBR)	49.72
6.	Nabil Selmi (ALG)	50.45
7.	Abdullah Ghulum (UAE)	51.51
—	Ibou Faye (SEN)	DNF

RANK	HEAT 4	TIME
1.	Shunji Karube (JPN)	48.63
2.	Joey Woody (USA)	48.89
3.	Kareem Archer (JAM)	49.11
4.	Ziad Abou Ahmed (AUS)	49.21
5.	Paweł Januszewski (POL)	49.29
6.	Willie Smith (NAM)	51.12
7.	Domingo Cordero (PUR)	52.26

RANK	HEAT 5	TIME
1.	Ruslan Mashchenko (RUS)	48.93
2.	Derrick Adkins (USA)	49.23
3.	Vadim Zadoynov (MDA)	49.49
4.	Laurent Ottoz (ITA)	49.69
5.	Egīls Tēbelis (LAT)	50.42
—	Miro Kocuvan (SLO)	DNF
—	Pascal Maran (FRA)	DQ

RANK	HEAT 6	TIME
1.	Stephane Diagana (FRA)	49.34
2.	Ken Harnden (ZIM)	49.42
3.	Kazuhiko Yamazaki (JPN)	49.47
4.	Octavius Terry (USA)	49.84
5.	Kenneth Enyeazu (NGR)	50.12
6.	Cleverson da Silva (BRA)	50.63
7.	Ibrahim El Hefeny (EGY)	50.70
—	Ilir Xhanari (ALB)	DNF

RANK	HEAT 7	TIME
1.	Bryan Bronson (USA)	48.84
2.	Dusan Kovacs (HUN)	48.99
3.	Ashraf Saber (ITA)	49.11
4.	Jimmy Coco (FRA)	49.64
5.	Carlos Zbinden (CHI)	50.42
6.	Rohan Robinson (AUS)	51.67
7.	Lambros Zervakos (GRE)	52.94

== See also ==
- 1994 Men's European Championships 400m Hurdles (Helsinki)
- 1995 Men's World Championships 400m Hurdles (Gothenburg)
- 1996 Men's Olympic 400m Hurdles (Atlanta)
- 1998 Men's European Championships 400m Hurdles (Budapest)
- 1999 Men's World Championships 400m Hurdles (Seville)
- 2000 Men's Olympic 400m Hurdles (Sydney)
