= 1994 European Athletics Championships – Men's 400 metres hurdles =

Men's 400 metres hurdles at the European Athletics Championships

These are the official results of the Men's 400 metres hurdles event at the 1994 European Championships in Helsinki, Finland, held at Helsinki Olympic Stadium on 7, 8, and 10 August 1994.

== Medalists ==
Gold	Oleg Tverdokhleb; Ukraine
Silver	Sven Nylander; Sweden
Bronze	Stéphane Diagana; France

== Final ==
Rank	Final	Time
	Oleg Tverdokhleb (UKR)	48.06
	Sven Nylander (SWE)	48.22
	Stéphane Diagana (FRA)	48.23
4.	Pedro Rodrigues (POR)	48.77 (NR)
5.	Edgar Itt (GER)	49.11
6.	Peter Crampton (GBR)	49.45
7.	Vadim Zadoynov (MDA)	49.50
8.	Gary Cadogan (GBR)	49.53

== Semifinals ==
- Held on 8 August 1994

Rank	Heat 1	Time
1.	Sven Nylander (SWE)	48.72
2.	Pedro Rodrigues (POR)	49.04 (NR)
3.	Edgar Itt (GER)	49.40
4.	Gary Cadogan (GBR)	49.42
5.	Jozef Kucej (SVK)	49.75
6.	Paweł Januszewski (POL)	49.95
7.	Dusán Kovács (HUN)	50.01
8.	Fabrizio Mori (ITA)	1:06.35

Rank	Heat 2	Time
1.	Stéphane Diagana (FRA)	48.47
2.	Oleg Tverdokhleb (UKR)	49.00
3.	Peter Crampton (GBR)	49.26
4.	Vadim Zadoynov (MDA)	49.30
5.	Niklas Wallenlind (SWE)	49.31
6.	Marc Dollendorf (BEL)	49.34
7.	Ruslan Mashchenko (RUS)	50.47
8.	Michael Kaul (GER)	51.30

== Qualifying heats ==
Rank	Heat 1	Time
1.	Stéphane Diagana (FRA)	49.29
2.	Vadim Zadoynov (MDA)	49.51
3.	Peter Crampton (GBR)	49.71
4.	Michael Kaul (GER)	50.04
5.	Piotr Kotlarski (POL)	50.04
6.	Daniel Ritter (SUI)	50.16
7.	Carlos Silva (POR)	50.88

Rank	Heat 2	Time
1.	Pedro Rodrigues (POR)	49.05 (NR)
2.	Gary Cadogan (GBR)	49.55
3.	Paweł Januszewski (POL)	50.01
4.	Vesa-Pekka Pihlavisto (FIN)	50.12
5.	Marko Granat (SWE)	50.28
6.	Tom McGuirk (IRL)	50.84
7.	Giorgio Frinolli (ITA)	51.16
8.	Costas Pochanis (CYP)	52.07

Rank	Heat 3	Time
1.	Oleg Tverdokhleb (UKR)	49.20
2.	Niklas Wallenlind (SWE)	49.45
3.	Marc Dollendorf (BEL)	49.45
4.	Dusán Kovács (HUN)	50.01
5.	Lawrence Lynch (GBR)	50.24
6.	Miro Kocuvan (SLO)	50.30
7.	Íñigo Monreal (ESP)	51.51

Rank	Heat 4	Time
1.	Edgar Itt (GER)	49.62
2.	Fabrizio Mori (ITA)	49.71
3.	Jozef Kucej (SVK)	49.91
4.	Jean-Paul Bruwier (BEL)	50.28
5.	Aleksey Bazarov (ISR)	50.31
6.	Petteri Pulkkinnen (FIN)	51.05
7.	Salvador Vila (ESP)	51.18
8.	Marek Helinurm (EST)	51.87

Rank	Heat 5	Time
1.	Sven Nylander (SWE)	49.71
2.	Ruslan Mashchenko (RUS)	50.28
3.	Ismo Hämeenniemi (FIN)	50.44
4.	Óscar Pitillas (ESP)	50.50
5.	Stéphane Caristan (FRA)	50.84
6.	Ashraf Saber (ITA)	50.87
7.	Helge Bormann (GER)	51.49

== Participation ==
According to an unofficial count, 37 athletes from 21 countries participated in the event.

- Belgium (2)
- Cyprus (1)
- Estonia (1)
- Finland (3)
- France (2)
- Germany (3)
- Hungary (1)
- Ireland (1)
- Israel (1)
- Italy (3)
- Moldova (1)
- Poland (2)
- Portugal (2)
- Russia (1)
- Slovakia (1)
- Slovenia (1)
- Spain (3)
- Sweden (3)
- Switzerland (1)
- Ukraine (1)
- United Kingdom (3)

== See also ==
- 1990 Men's European Championships 400m Hurdles (Split)
- 1992 Men's Olympic 400m Hurdles (Barcelona)
- 1993 Men's World Championships 400m Hurdles (Stuttgart)
- 1995 Men's World Championships 400m Hurdles (Gothenburg)
- 1996 Men's Olympic 400m Hurdles (Atlanta)
- 1997 Men's World Championships 400m Hurdles (Athens)
- 1998 Men's European Championships 400m Hurdles (Budapest)
