= 1999 World Championships in Athletics – Men's 400 metres hurdles =

These are the official results of the Men's 400 metres Hurdles event at the 1999 IAAF World Championships in Seville, Spain. There were a total number of 50 participating athletes, with seven qualifying heats, two semi-finals and the final held on Friday, 27 August 1999 at 21:00.

== Final ==
RANK	FINAL	TIME
	Fabrizio Mori (ITA)	47.72
	Stéphane Diagana (FRA)	48.12
	Marcel Schelbert (SUI)	48.13
4.	Eronilde de Araujo (BRA)	48.13
5.	Paweł Januszewski (POL)	48.19
6.	Joey Woody (USA)	48.77
7.	Dinsdale Morgan (JAM)	48.92
8.	Torrance Zellner (USA)	49.06

== Semi-finals ==
- Held on Wednesday 1999-08-25

RANK	HEAT 1	TIME
1.	Joey Woody (USA)	48.55
2.	Paweł Januszewski (POL)	48.63
3.	Marcel Schelbert (SUI)	48.80
4.	Kemel Thompson (JAM)	48.95
5.	Jiří Mužík (CZE)	49.17
6.	Samuel Matete (ZAM)	49.28
7.	Kazuhiko Yamazaki (JPN)	49.46
8.	Jean-Laurent Heusse (FRA)	50.17

RANK	HEAT 2	TIME
1.	Stéphane Diagana (FRA)	48.18
2.	Fabrizio Mori (ITA)	48.29
3.	Eronilde de Araujo (BRA)	48.41
4.	Torrance Zellner (USA)	48.53
5.	Dinsdale Morgan (JAM)	48.71
6.	Tibor Bedi (HUN)	49.00
7.	Carlos Silva (POR)	49.45
8.	Thomas Goller (GER)	49.89

== Qualifying heats ==
- Held on Tuesday 1999-08-24

RANK	HEAT 1	TIME
1.	Kazuhiko Yamazaki (JPN)	49.08
2.	Tibor Bédi (HUN)	49.38
3.	Periklis Iakovakis (GRE)	49.53
4.	Ken Harnden (ZIM)	49.72
5.	Cleverson da Silva (BRA)	49.98
6.	Vadim Zadoynov (MDA)	50.14
7.	Zahr-el-Din El-Najem (SYR)	50.35
	Tien-Wen Chen (TPE)	DQ

RANK	HEAT 2	TIME
1.	Samuel Matete (ZAM)	48.90
2.	Carlos Silva (POR)	49.02
3.	Miro Kocuvan (SLO)	49.63
4.	Félix Sánchez (DOM)	49.67
5.	Tan Chunhua (CHN)	50.10
6.	Alexandre Marchand (CAN)	50.30
7.	Ashok K. Jayasundara (SRI)	51.70

RANK	HEAT 3	TIME
1.	Fabrizio Mori (ITA)	49.07
2.	Pawel Januszewski (POL)	49.21
3.	Jiří Mužík (CZE)	49.40
4.	Pedro Rodrigues (POR)	49.97
5.	Siniša Peša (YUG)	50.40
6.	Curt Young (PAN)	51.48
	Llewellyn Herbert (RSA)	DNS

RANK	HEAT 4	TIME
1.	Dinsdale Morgan (JAM)	48.99
2.	Jean Laurent Heusse (FRA)	49.82
3.	Hadi Soua'an Al-Somaily (KSA)	49.88
4.	Darko Juričić (CRO)	49.96
5.	Jeff Ellis (CAN)	50.77
6.	Hamed Ziad Abou (AUS)	50.85
	Chris Rawlinson (GBR)	DNS

RANK	HEAT 5	TIME
1.	Stéphane Diagana (FRA)	48.55
2.	Eronilde de Araujo (BRA)	48.81
3.	Torrance Zellner (USA)	48.97
4.	Hideaki Kawamura (JPN)	49.66
5.	Monte Raymond (CAN)	50.75
6.	Ivan Wakit (PNG)	52.55
	Costas Pochanis (CYP)	DNF

RANK	HEAT 6	TIME
1.	Marcel Schelbert (SUI)	48.66
2.	Joey Woody (USA)	49.18
3.	Ibou Faye (SEN)	49.48
4.	Shunji Karube (JPN)	49.52
5.	Mustapha Sdad (MAR)	49.64
6.	Anthony Borsumato (GBR)	50.05
	Kenneth Enyiazu (NGR)	DNS

RANK	HEAT 7	TIME
1.	Kemel Thompson (JAM)	49.17
2.	Thomas Goller (GER)	49.52
3.	Angelo Taylor (USA)	49.58
4.	Paul Gray (GBR)	50.15
5.	Vladislav Shiryayev (RUS)	50.34
6.	Victor Houston (BAR)	50.57
7.	Asha Ram Chaudhary (NEP)	53.87

== See also ==
- 1996 Men's Olympic 400m Hurdles (Atlanta)
- 1998 Men's European Championships 400m Hurdles (Budapest)
- 2000 Men's Olympic 400m Hurdles (Sydney)
- 2002 Men's European Championships 400m Hurdles (Munich)
