= Athletics at the 1995 Summer Universiade – Men's 4 × 400 metres relay =

The men's 4 × 400 metres relay event at the 1995 Summer Universiade was held on 2–3 September at the Hakatanomori Athletic Stadium in Fukuoka, Japan.

== Medalists ==
Gold	Silver	Bronze
United States; Ryan Hayden; Leonard Byrd; Andre Morris; Anthuan Maybank; Bryan Woodward*; Octavius Terry*	Russia; Innokentiy Zharov; Dmitriy Bey; Sergey Voronin; Dmitriy Kosov	Great Britain; Antony Williams; Jared Deacon; Gary Jennings; David Grindley

* Athletes who competed in heats only.

== Results ==
=== Heats ===
Qualification: First 2 teams of each heat (Q) plus the next 2 fastest (q) qualified for the final.

Rank	Heat	Nation	Athletes	Time	Notes
1	3	Japan	Kenji Tabata, Yoshihiko Saito, Jun Osakada, Masayoshi Kan	3:03.89	Q
2	1	Russia	Innokentiy Zharov, Dmitriy Bey, Sergey Voronin, Dmitriy Kosov	3:04.09	Q
3	2	United States	Ryan Hayden, Bryan Woodward, Octavius Terry, Anthuan Maybank	3:04.49	Q
4	3	Poland	Piotr Kotlarski, Paweł Januszewski, Krzysztof Mehlich, Piotr Rysiukiewicz	3:06.14	Q
5	1	Great Britain	Antony Williams, Jared Deacon, Gary Jennings, David Grindley	3:06.40	Q
6	3	Jamaica	Mitchel Francis, Linval Laird, Mario Watson, Dennis Blake	3:06.60	q
7	1	South Africa	Liod Kgopong, Hezekiél Sepeng, Samuel Tlala, Arnaud Malherbe	3:07.62	q
8	2	Portugal	Mário Reis, Pedro Rodrigues, António Abrantes, Carlos Silva	3:07.67	Q
9	3	Canada	William Best, Michel Genest-Lahaye, Patrice Doucet, Byron Goodwin	3:08.33	
10	1	Germany	Andreas Hein, Olaf Hense, Falk Balzer, Julian Völkel	3:08.97	
11	2	Hungary	Gábor Kiss, Balázs Korányi, Miklós Gyulai, Dusán Kovács	3:09.59	
12	3	New Zealand	Andrew Aldworth, Mark Wilson, Grant Coutts, Dean Sheddan	3:10.08	
13	2	Spain	Joaquin Casadella, Iñigo Monreal, Oscar Pitillas, Pablo Escribá	3:10.83	
14	3	Botswana	Rampa Mosweu, Modisa Bakupi, Tobokani Mosetlha, Justice Dipeba	3:11.51	
15	1	Namibia	Ralph Blaauw, Engelhardt Uiseb, Immanuel Kharigub, Vincent van Rooyen	3:15.69	
16	1	Hong Kong	Wong Pui Hung, Wong Kin On, Choi Wai Kin, Wong Wai Kuen	3:20.05	
17	1	Macau	Lei Vai Kun, Man Kin Seng, Lai Ka Hou, Au Chi Kun	3:26.62	
	2	Algeria	Ouahid Ketite, Mehdi Sekkouh, Farouk Amaouche, Mariche Mohamed	DQ	
	2	Nigeria		DNS	
	2	Ukraine		DNS	

=== Final ===
Rank	Nation	Athletes	Time	Notes
1st place, gold medalist(s)	United States	Ryan Hayden, Leonard Byrd, Andre Morris, Anthuan Maybank	3:00.40	UR
2nd place, silver medalist(s)	Russia	Innokentiy Zharov, Dmitriy Bey, Sergey Voronin, Dmitriy Kosov	3:01.95	
3rd place, bronze medalist(s)	Great Britain	Antony Williams, Jared Deacon, Gary Jennings, David Grindley	3:02.42	
4	Japan	Kenji Tabata, Yoshihiko Saito, Kazuhiko Yamazaki, Masayoshi Kan	3:02.51	
5	Jamaica	Mitchel Francis, Linval Laird, Mario Watson, Dennis Blake	3:04.77	
6	Poland	Piotr Kotlarski, Paweł Januszewski, Krzysztof Mehlich, Piotr Rysiukiewicz	3:05.08	
7	Portugal	Carlos Silva, António Abrantes, Mário Reis, Pedro Rodrigues	3:05.48	NR
	South Africa		DNS	
