= 1988 World Junior Championships in Athletics – Men's 400 metres hurdles =

The men's 400 metres hurdles event at the 1988 World Junior Championships in Athletics was held in Sudbury, Ontario, Canada, at Laurentian University Stadium on 27, 28 and 29 July.

== Medalists ==
Gold	Kelly Carter; United States
Silver	Mugur Mateescu; Romania
Bronze	Vadim Zadoynov; Soviet Union

== Results ==
=== Final ===
29 July

Rank	Name	Nationality	Time	Notes
1st place, gold medalist(s)	Kelly Carter	United States	49.50	
2nd place, silver medalist(s)	Mugur Mateescu	Romania	50.70	
3rd place, bronze medalist(s)	Vadim Zadoynov	Soviet Union	50.88	
4	Ralph Carrington	United States	51.01	
5	Samuel Matete	Zambia	51.70	
6	Bob Brown	United Kingdom	51.78	
7	Jean-François Zbinden	Switzerland	52.23	
8	David Niaré	France	52.40	

=== Semifinals ===
28 July

==== Semifinal 1 ====
Rank	Name	Nationality	Time	Notes
1	Ralph Carrington	United States	50.76	Q
2	Mugur Mateescu	Romania	51.31	Q
3	Vadim Zadoynov	Soviet Union	51.51	Q
4	Jean-François Zbinden	Switzerland	51.74	q
5	Paweł Woźniak	Poland	51.93	
6	Stéphane Traversini	France	52.44	
7	Assen Markov	Bulgaria	52.86	
	Paolo Bellino	Italy	DQ	

==== Semifinal 2 ====
Rank	Name	Nationality	Time	Notes
1	Kelly Carter	United States	50.99	Q
2	Samuel Matete	Zambia	51.56	Q
3	David Niaré	France	51.62	Q
4	Bob Brown	United Kingdom	51.63	q
5	Shigeru Yamaguchi	Japan	52.72	
6	Tesfaye Aschalew	Ethiopia	52.73	
7	Fabrizio Mori	Italy	54.54	
8	Michael Rose	Jamaica	55.31	

=== Heats ===
27 July

==== Heat 1 ====
Rank	Name	Nationality	Time	Notes
1	Vadim Zadoynov	Soviet Union	51.80	Q
2	Jean-François Zbinden	Switzerland	51.89	Q
3	Samuel Matete	Zambia	51.90	Q
4	Paweł Woźniak	Poland	52.11	q
5	Michael Rose	Jamaica	53.18	q
6	Gilbert Hashan	Mauritius	54.20	
7	Yehuda Moreli	Israel	54.21	

==== Heat 2 ====
Rank	Name	Nationality	Time	Notes
1	Bob Brown	United Kingdom	51.90	Q
2	Shigeru Yamaguchi	Japan	52.19	Q
3	Assen Markov	Bulgaria	52.99	Q
4	Fouad Ghanem	Bahrain	53.25	
5	Fabio Aleixo	Brazil	53.56	
6	Bernd Held	West Germany	53.88	
7	Hermund Storsæther	Norway	55.80	
8	Eric Krings	Guatemala	56.30	

==== Heat 3 ====
Rank	Name	Nationality	Time	Notes
1	Ralph Carrington	United States	52.02	Q
2	Fabrizio Mori	Italy	52.39	Q
3	Mugur Mateescu	Romania	52.57	Q
4	Stéphane Traversini	France	52.79	q
5	Salvador Vila	Spain	53.38	
6	Paulo Rodrigues	Brazil	53.48	
7	Benjamin Grant	Sierra Leone	55.24	
8	Ilidio Motty	Portugal	60.76	

==== Heat 4 ====
Rank	Name	Nationality	Time	Notes
1	Kelly Carter	United States	51.20	Q
2	David Niaré	France	52.54	Q
3	Paolo Bellino	Italy	52.70	Q
4	Tesfaye Aschalew	Ethiopia	52.75	q
5	Peter Campbell	United Kingdom	53.31	
6	Kristian Strømgaard	Denmark	53.84	

== Participation ==
According to an unofficial count, 29 athletes from 24 countries participated in the event.

- Bahrain (1)
- Brazil (2)
- Bulgaria (1)
- Denmark (1)
- Ethiopia (1)
- France (2)
- Guatemala (1)
- Israel (1)
- Italy (2)
- Jamaica (1)
- Japan (1)
- Mauritius (1)
- Norway (1)
- Poland (1)
- Portugal (1)
- Romania (1)
- Sierra Leone (1)
- Soviet Union (1)
- Spain (1)
- Switzerland (1)
- United Kingdom (2)
- United States (2)
- West Germany (1)
- Zambia (1)
