= Athletics at the 1996 Summer Olympics – Men's 400 metres hurdles =

Men's 400 metres hurdles at the Games of the XXVI Olympiad
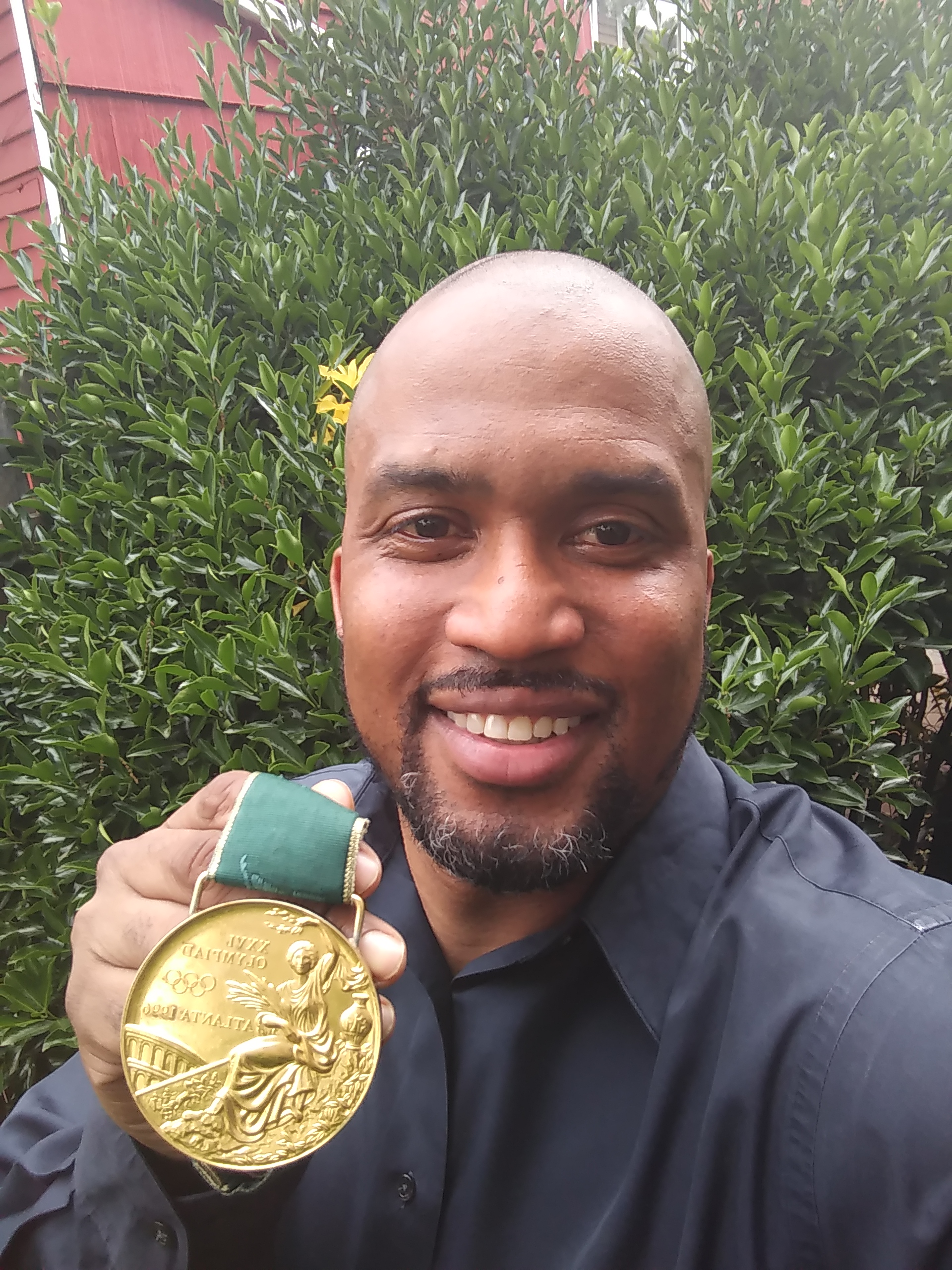
- Derrick Adkins (2018)
- Venue: Centennial Olympic Stadium
- Dates: 29 July 1996 (quarterfinals); 31 July 1996 (semifinals); 1 August 1996 (final)
- Competitors: 55 from 35 nations
- Winning time: 47.54

Medalists
1st place, gold medalist(s)		Derrick Adkins; United States
2nd place, silver medalist(s)		Samuel Matete; Zambia
3rd place, bronze medalist(s)		Calvin Davis; United States

The men's 400 metres hurdles was an event at the 1996 Summer Olympics in Atlanta, Georgia. There were 55 competitors from 35 nations. The maximum number of athletes per nation had been set at 3 since the 1930 Olympic Congress. The event was won by Derrick Adkins of the United States, the nation's fourth consecutive and 16th overall victory in the event. Samuel Matete of Zambia earned that nation's first medal in the event with his silver. American Calvin Davis took bronze.

== Background ==
This was the 21st time the event was held. It had been introduced along with the men's 200 metres hurdles in 1900, with the 200 being dropped after 1904 and the 400 being held through 1908 before being left off the 1912 programme. However, when the Olympics returned in 1920 after World War I, the men's 400 metres hurdles was back and would continue to be contested at every Games thereafter.

One of the eight finalists from the 1992 Games returned: silver medalist (and 1988 finalist) Winthrop Graham of Jamaica. Samuel Matete of Zambia, the favorite in 1992 before a hamstring injury kept him out of the final, was favored again after adding two World Championship silver medals (1993 and 1995) to his 1991 victory. American Derrick Adkins had won the 1995 World Championship and was also a serious contender.

Guyana, Latvia, Mauritius, Moldova, Panama, Qatar, Russia, Slovakia, Slovenia, and Zimbabwe each made their debut in the event. The United States made its 20th appearance, most of any nation, having missed only the boycotted 1980 Games.

== Competition format ==
The competition used the three-round format used every Games since 1908 (except the four-round competition in 1952): quarterfinals, semifinals, and a final. Ten sets of hurdles were set on the course. The hurdles were 3 feet (91.5 centimetres) tall and were placed 35 metres apart beginning 45 metres from the starting line, resulting in a 40 metres home stretch after the last hurdle. The 400 metres track was standard.

There were 7 quarterfinal heats with 7 or 8 athletes each. The top 2 men in each quarterfinal advanced to the semifinals along with the next fastest 2 overall. The 16 semifinalists were divided into 2 semifinals of 8 athletes each, with the top 4 in each semifinal advancing to the 8-man final.

== Records ==
These were the standing world and Olympic records (in seconds) prior to the 1996 Summer Olympics.

World record	Kevin Young (USA)	46.78	Barcelona, Spain	6 August 1992
Olympic record	Kevin Young (USA)	46.78	Barcelona, Spain	6 August 1992

No new world or Olympic records were set during the competition.

== Schedule ==
All times are Eastern Daylight Time (UTC-4)

Date	Time	Round
Monday, 29 July 1996	11:45	Quarterfinals
Wednesday, 31 July 1996	19:15	Semifinals
Thursday, 1 August 1996	20:25	Final

== Results ==
=== Quarterfinals ===
==== Quarterfinal 1 ====
Rank	Lane	Athlete	Nation	Time	Notes
1	7	Ibou Faye	Senegal	48.84	Q
2	8	Fabrizio Mori	Italy	48.90	Q
3	5	Kazuhiko Yamazaki	Japan	49.07	
4	6	Dinsdale Morgan	Jamaica	49.16	
5	4	Kehinde Aladefa	Nigeria	49.60	
6	3	Peter Crampton	Great Britain	49.78	
7	1	Gilbert Hashan	Mauritius	49.94	
8	2	Salvador Vila	Spain	50.55	

==== Quarterfinal 2 ====
Rank	Lane	Athlete	Nation	Time	Notes
1	2	Eronilde de Araujo	Brazil	48.52	Q
2	1	Laurent Ottoz	Italy	48.92	Q
3	7	Carlos Silva	Portugal	49.09	
4	3	Mubarak Faraj	Qatar	49.27	
5	4	Miro Kocuvan	Slovenia	49.66	
6	8	Jean-Paul Bruwier	Belgium	49.69	
7	5	Barnabas Kinyor	Kenya	49.82	
8	6	Mugur Mateescu	Romania	49.97	

==== Quarterfinal 3 ====
Rank	Lane	Athlete	Nation	Time	Notes
1	5	Samuel Matete	Zambia	48.21	Q
2	2	Rohan Robinson	Australia	48.89	Q
3	3	Erick Keter	Kenya	49.03	
4	6	Vadim Zadoynov	Moldova	49.73	
5	7	Hadi Somayli	Saudi Arabia	49.94	
6	8	Hamadou Mbaye	Senegal	50.30	
7	4	Llewellyn Herbert	South Africa	51.13	

==== Quarterfinal 4 ====
Rank	Lane	Athlete	Nation	Time	Notes
1	5	Bryan Bronson	United States	49.06	Q
2	6	Dusan Kovacs	Hungary	49.23	Q
3	3	Pawel Januszewski	Poland	49.63	
4	4	Hideaki Kawamura	Japan	49.88	
5	8	Julius Masvanise	Zimbabwe	50.16	
6	2	Jozef Kucej	Slovakia	50.31	
7	1	Amadou Sy Savane	Guinea	50.90	
8	7	Simon Hollingsworth	Australia	52.16	

==== Quarterfinal 5 ====
Rank	Lane	Athlete	Nation	Time	Notes
1	1	Jon Ridgeon	Great Britain	49.31	Q
2	8	Marc Dollendorf	Belgium	49.49	Q
3	3	Ruslan Mashchenko	Russia	49.94	
4	5	Egīls Tēbelis	Latvia	50.73	
5	6	Domingo Cordero	Puerto Rico	51.20	
6	4	Marcel Schelbert	Switzerland	51.20	
7	2	Curt Young	Panama	55.20	
—	7	Winthrop Graham	Jamaica	DNF	

==== Quarterfinal 6 ====
Rank	Lane	Athlete	Nation	Time	Notes
1	2	Calvin Davis	United States	48.94	Q
2	8	Sven Nylander	Sweden	49.54	Q
3	6	Ashraf Saber	Italy	49.71	
4	5	Gideon Biwott	Kenya	49.74	
5	1	Tom McGuirk	Ireland	50.76	
6	7	Cleverson Silva	Brazil	51.23	
7	4	Óscar Pitillas	Spain	51.35	
8	3	Lancelot Gittens	Guyana	54.79	

==== Quarterfinal 7 ====
Rank	Lane	Athlete	Nation	Time	Notes
1	6	Derrick Adkins	United States	48.46	Q
2	8	Everson Teixeira	Brazil	48.52	Q
3	3	Ken Harnden	Zimbabwe	48.54	q
4	7	Neil Gardner	Jamaica	48.30	q
5	1	Shunji Karube	Japan	48.96	
6	4	Gary Jennings	Great Britain	50.41	
7	2	Inigo Monreal	Spain	52.23	
8	5	Ivan Wakit	Papua New Guinea	53.42	

=== Semifinals ===
==== Semifinal 1 ====
Rank	Lane	Athlete	Nation	Time	Notes
1	3	Derrick Adkins	United States	47.76	Q
2	1	Sven Nylander	Sweden	48.21	Q
3	2	Fabrizio Mori	Italy	48.43	Q
4	6	Eronilde de Araujo	Brazil	48.45	Q
5	8	Dusan Kovacs	Hungary	48.57	
6	7	Ken Harnden	Zimbabwe	48.61	
7	4	Jon Ridgeon	Great Britain	49.43	
8	5	Bryan Bronson	United States	50.32	

==== Semifinal 2 ====
Rank	Lane	Athlete	Nation	Time	Notes
1	3	Calvin Davis	United States	47.91	Q
2	4	Everson Teixeira	Brazil	48.28	Q
3	6	Samuel Matete	Zambia	48.28	Q
4	7	Rohan Robinson	Australia	48.28	Q
5	1	Neil Gardner	Jamaica	48.30	
6	2	Laurent Ottoz	Italy	48.52	
7	5	Ibou Faye	Senegal	48.84	
8	8	Marc Dollendorf	Belgium	48.91	

=== Final ===
Rank	Lane	Athlete	Nation	Time
1st place, gold medalist(s)	6	Derrick Adkins	United States	47.54
2nd place, silver medalist(s)	1	Samuel Matete	Zambia	47.78
3rd place, bronze medalist(s)	5	Calvin Davis	United States	47.96
4	4	Sven Nylander	Sweden	47.98
5	8	Rohan Robinson	Australia	48.30
6	7	Fabrizio Mori	Italy	48.41
7	3	Everson Teixeira	Brazil	48.57
8	2	Eronilde de Araujo	Brazil	48.78

== Results summary ==
Rank	Athlete	Nation	Quarterfinals	Semifinals	Final
1st place, gold medalist(s)	Derrick Adkins	United States	48.46	47.76	47.54
2nd place, silver medalist(s)	Samuel Matete	Zambia	48.21	48.28	47.78
3rd place, bronze medalist(s)	Calvin Davis	United States	48.94	47.91	47.96
4	Sven Nylander	Sweden	49.54	48.21	47.98
5	Rohan Robinson	Australia	48.89	48.28	48.30
6	Fabrizio Mori	Italy	48.90	48.43	48.41
7	Everson Teixeira	Brazil	48.52	48.28	48.57
8	Eronilde de Araujo	Brazil	48.52	48.45	48.78
9	Neil Gardner	Jamaica	48.59	48.30	Did not advance
10	Laurent Ottoz	Italy	48.92	48.52	Did not advance
11	Dusan Kovacs	Hungary	49.23	48.57	Did not advance
12	Ken Harnden	Zimbabwe	48.54	48.61	Did not advance
13	Ibou Faye	Senegal	48.84	48.84	Did not advance
14	Marc Dollendorf	Belgium	49.49	48.91	Did not advance
15	Jon Ridgeon	Great Britain	49.31	49.43	Did not advance
16	Bryan Bronson	United States	49.06	50.32	Did not advance
17	Shunji Karube	Japan	48.96	Did not advance	
18	Erick Keter	Kenya	49.03	Did not advance	
19	Kazuhiko Yamazaki	Japan	49.07	Did not advance	
20	Carlos Silva	Portugal	49.09	Did not advance	
21	Dinsdale Morgan	Jamaica	49.16	Did not advance	
22	Mubarak Faraj	Qatar	49.27	Did not advance	
23	Kehinde Aladefa	Nigeria	49.60	Did not advance	
24	Pawel Januszewski	Poland	49.63	Did not advance	
25	Miro Kocuvan	Slovenia	49.66	Did not advance	
26	Jean-Paul Bruwier	Belgium	49.69	Did not advance	
27	Ashraf Saber	Italy	49.71	Did not advance	
28	Vadim Zadoynov	Moldova	49.73	Did not advance	
29	Gideon Biwott	Kenya	49.74	Did not advance	
30	Peter Crampton	Great Britain	49.78	Did not advance	
31	Barnabas Kinyor	Kenya	49.82	Did not advance	
32	Hideaki Kawamura	Japan	49.88	Did not advance	
33	Gilbert Hashan	Mauritius	49.94	Did not advance	
33	Hadi Somayli	Saudi Arabia	49.94	Did not advance	
33	Ruslan Mashchenko	Russia	49.94	Did not advance	
36	Mugur Mateescu	Romania	49.97	Did not advance	
37	Julius Masvanise	Zimbabwe	50.16	Did not advance	
38	Hamadou Mbaye	Senegal	50.30	Did not advance	
39	Jozef Kucej	Slovakia	50.31	Did not advance	
40	Gary Jennings	Great Britain	50.41	Did not advance	
41	Salvador Vila	Spain	50.55	Did not advance	
42	Egīls Tēbelis	Latvia	50.73	Did not advance	
43	Tom McGuirk	Ireland	50.76	Did not advance	
44	Amadou Sy Savane	Guinea	50.90	Did not advance	
45	Llewellyn Herbert	South Africa	51.13	Did not advance	
46	Domingo Cordero	Puerto Rico	51.20	Did not advance	
46	Marcel Schelbert	Switzerland	51.20	Did not advance	
48	Cleverson Silva	Brazil	51.23	Did not advance	
49	Óscar Pitillas	Spain	51.35	Did not advance	
50	Simon Hollingsworth	Australia	52.16	Did not advance	
51	Inigo Monreal	Spain	52.23	Did not advance	
52	Ivan Wakit	Papua New Guinea	53.42	Did not advance	
53	Lancelot Gittens	Guyana	54.79	Did not advance	
54	Curt Young	Panama	55.20	Did not advance	
55	Winthrop Graham	Jamaica	DNF	Did not advance	

== See also ==
- 1993 Men's World Championships 400m Hurdles (Stuttgart)
- 1994 Men's European Championships 400m Hurdles (Helsinki)
- 1995 Men's World Championships 400m Hurdles (Gothenburg)
- 1997 Men's World Championships 400m Hurdles (Athens)
- 1998 Men's European Championships 400m Hurdles (Budapest)
- 1999 Men's World Championships 400m Hurdles (Seville)
