= Fabrizio Mori =

Italian hurdler

Personal information
- Nationality: Italian
- Born: 28 June 1969 (age 57) Livorno, Italy
- Height: 1.75 m (5 ft 9 in)
- Weight: 68 kg (150 lb)

Sport
- Country: Italy
- Sport: Athletics
- Event: 400 metres hurdles
- Club: G.S. Fiamme Gialle

Achievements and titles
- Personal best: 400 m hs: 47.54 (2001)
Medal record
Event	1st	2nd	3rd
World Championships	1	1	0
European Championships	0	0	1
Mediterranean Games	0	1	1
European Cup	5	4	2
Military World Games	0	2	1
World Championships
Gold medal – first place	1999 Seville	400 m hs
Silver medal – second place	2001 Edmonton	400 m hs
European Championships
Bronze medal – third place	1998 Budapest	400 m hs
Mediterranean Games
Silver medal – second place	1991 Athens	400 m hs
Bronze medal – third place	1997 Bari	4 × 400 m relay
European Cup
Gold medal – first place	1996 Madrid	400 m hs
Gold medal – first place	1997 Munich	400 m hs
Gold medal – first place	1999 Paris	400 m hs
Gold medal – first place	2001 Bremen	400 m hs
Gold medal – first place	2002 Annecy	400 m hs
Silver medal – second place	1995 Villeneuve d'Ascq	4 × 400 m relay
Silver medal – second place	1997 Munich	4 × 400 m relay
Silver medal – second place	1998 St. Pertsburg	400 m hs
Silver medal – second place	1998 St. Pertsburg	4 × 400 m relay
Bronze medal – third place	1991 Frankfurt	400 m hs
Bronze medal – third place	2000 Gateshead	400 m hs
Military World Games
Silver medal – second place	1995 Rome	400 m hs
Silver medal – second place	1999 Zagreb	400 m hs
Bronze medal – third place	1995 Rome	4 × 400 m relay

Fabrizio Mori (born 28 June 1969 in Livorno) is an Italian hurdler, best known for his gold medal at the 1999 World Championships.

== Biography ==
Fabrizio Mori won nineteen medals at the International athletics competitions, five of these with national relays team. He represented in the Golden Gala eight times between 1992 and 2002. His greatest success was in 1999 when he copped the gold medal at the World Championship, beating athletes such as Bryan Bronson, Stephane Diagana and Samuel Matete. In 2010 he was ranked 16th in the world along with Derrick Adkins of the United States with his 47.54 best time This also makes him the third fastest European ever

Mori announced his retirement from professional athletics in 2006 in front of the 2006 Winter Olympics crowd gathered in his homeland, Turin, Italy. His personal best over 400 metres hurdles, which is also an Italian record, is 47.54 seconds, achieved at the 2001 World Championships in Edmonton. He participated at three editions of the Summer Olympics (1992, 1996, 2000), he has 32 caps in national team from 1988 to 2002.

== National records ==
- 400 metres hurdles: 47.54 ( (Canada) Edmonton, 10 August 2001) – current holder

== Progression ==
He finished the season 11 times in world top 25, in 1999 he was World Leader.

Year	Time	Venue	Date	World Rank
2005	50.06	(Italy) Turin	3 Jun	
2003	50.18	(Italy) Florence	21 Jun	
2002	48.23	(Italy) Rome	12 Jul	8th
2001	47.54	(Canada) Edmonton	10 Aug	2nd
2000	48.40	(Australia) Sydney	25 Sep	10th
1999	47.72	(Spain) Sevilla	27 Aug	1st
1998	48.36	(Italy) Rome	14 Jul	11th
1997	47.79	(Germany) Munich	16 Aug	3rd
1996	48.33	(Italy) Bologna	26 May	13th
1995	49.27	(South Africa) Cape Town	6 May	
1994	49.24	(Italy) Rome	8 Jun	19th
1993	49.23	(Germany) Stuttgart	17 Aug	24th
1992	49.16	(Spain) Barcelona	3 Aug	23rd
1991	48.92	(Italy) Tokyo	25 Aug	11th
1990	52.00		1 Jan	
1989	49.86	(Italy) Catania	21 Jun	
1988	51.46	(Spain) Lloret de Mar	9 Jul	
1987	52.55		1 Jan	

== Achievements ==
Year	Competition	Venue	Position	Event	Notes
Representing Italy
1988	World Junior Championships	Sudbury, Canada	14th (sf)	400 m hurdles	54.54
1988	World Junior Championships	Sudbury, Canada	—	4 × 400 m relay	DNF
1991	Mediterranean Games	Athens, Greece	2nd	400 metres hurdles	49.85
1994	European Championships	Helsinki, Finland	16th (sf)	400 m hurdles	66.35
1996	Olympic Games	Atlanta, United States	6th	400 metres hurdles	48.71
1997	World Championships	Athens, Greece	4th	400 metres hurdles	48.05
1997	World Championships	Athens, Greece	7th	4 × 400 metres relay	3:01.52
1998	European Championships	Budapest, Hungary	3rd	400 metres hurdles	48.71
1999	World Championships	Seville, Spain	1st	400 metres hurdles	47.72
2000	Olympic Games	Sydney, Australia	7th	400 metres hurdles	48.78
2001	World Championships	Edmonton, Canada	2nd	400 metres hurdles	47.54
2002	European Championships	Munich, Germany	4th	400 metres hurdles	49.05

== National titles ==
He has won 3 times the individual national championship.

- 3 wins in the 400 metres hurdles (1989, 1991, 1996)

== See also ==
- Italian records in athletics
- Italy national relay team
- Italian all-time top lists – 400 metres hurdles
- FIDAL Hall of Fame

Sporting positions
Preceded by (United States) Bryan Bronson	Men's 400 m Hurdles Best Year Performance; 1999	Succeeded by (United States) Angelo Taylor
