= 1990 World Junior Championships in Athletics – Men's 400 metres hurdles =

The men's 400 metres hurdles event at the 1990 World Junior Championships in Athletics was held in Plovdiv, Bulgaria, at Deveti Septemvri Stadium on 8, 9 and 10 August.

== Medalists ==
Gold	Rohan Robinson; Australia
Silver	Yoshihiko Saito; Japan
Bronze	Aleksandr Belikov; Soviet Union

== Results ==
=== Final ===
10 August

Rank	Name	Nationality	Time	Notes
1st place, gold medalist(s)	Rohan Robinson	Australia	49.73	
2nd place, silver medalist(s)	Yoshihiko Saito	Japan	49.99	
3rd place, bronze medalist(s)	Aleksandr Belikov	Soviet Union	50.22	
4	Pedro Rodrigues	Portugal	50.43	
5	Pedro Piñera	Cuba	50.81	
6	Miro Kocuvan	Yugoslavia	50.82	
7	Rick Jordan	United States	51.16	
8	Kazuhiko Yamazaki	Japan	51.42	

=== Semifinals ===
9 August

==== Semifinal 1 ====
Rank	Name	Nationality	Time	Notes
1	Rohan Robinson	Australia	50.59	Q
2	Yoshihiko Saito	Japan	50.86	Q
3	Pedro Piñera	Cuba	51.19	Q
4	Rick Jordan	United States	51.23	Q
5	Sammy Biwott	Kenya	51.94	
6	Plamen Nyagin	Bulgaria	52.76	
7	Matteo Raimondi	Italy	53.12	
	Andrey Semakin	Soviet Union	DNS	

==== Semifinal 2 ====
Rank	Name	Nationality	Time	Notes
1	Aleksandr Belikov	Soviet Union	50.47	Q
2	Pedro Rodrigues	Portugal	50.70	Q
3	Kazuhiko Yamazaki	Japan	50.79	Q
4	Miro Kocuvan	Yugoslavia	50.82	Q
5	Hendrik Willems	West Germany	51.89	
6	Massimo Redaelli	Italy	52.27	
7	Winston Sinclair	Jamaica	52.68	
8	Rubén Menéndez	Spain	53.20	

=== Heats ===
8 August

==== Heat 1 ====
Rank	Name	Nationality	Time	Notes
1	Kazuhiko Yamazaki	Japan	51.30	Q
2	Rohan Robinson	Australia	51.56	Q
3	Winston Sinclair	Jamaica	51.88	Q
4	Plamen Nyagin	Bulgaria	52.13	q
5	Hendrik Willems	West Germany	52.28	q
6	Massimo Redaelli	Italy	52.45	q
7	Abdelhaq Lahlali	Morocco	53.28	

==== Heat 2 ====
Rank	Name	Nationality	Time	Notes
1	Aleksandr Belikov	Soviet Union	51.57	Q
2	Rick Jordan	United States	51.95	Q
3	Pedro Rodrigues	Portugal	52.01	Q
4	Matteo Raimondi	Italy	52.42	q
5	Daniel Blochwitz	East Germany	52.77	
6	Óscar Pitillas	Spain	52.90	
7	Chiu Wensheng	Chinese Taipei	53.21	

==== Heat 3 ====
Rank	Name	Nationality	Time	Notes
1	Sammy Biwott	Kenya	51.64	Q
2	Pedro Piñera	Cuba	52.53	Q
3	Rubén Menéndez	Spain	52.88	Q
4	Simon Hollingsworth	Australia	52.90	
5	Kostas Pochanis	Cyprus	53.93	
6	Jean Philip Brunel	France	54.16	
7	Jürgen Neubarth	Austria	54.48	

==== Heat 4 ====
Rank	Name	Nationality	Time	Notes
1	Yoshihiko Saito	Japan	51.28	Q
2	Miro Kocuvan	Yugoslavia	52.43	Q
3	Andrey Semakin	Soviet Union	52.46	Q
4	Jean-Paul Bruwier	Belgium	52.64	
5	Norge Bell	Cuba	52.70	
6	Thomas Zverina	Canada	53.18	
7	Jaco van Wyk	Namibia	53.85	
8	Vasilis Flouris	Greece	54.66	

== Participation ==
According to an unofficial count, 29 athletes from 23 countries participated in the event.

- Australia (2)
- Austria (1)
- Belgium (1)
- Bulgaria (1)
- Canada (1)
- Chinese Taipei (1)
- Cuba (2)
- Cyprus (1)
- East Germany (1)
- France (1)
- Greece (1)
- Italy (2)
- Jamaica (1)
- Japan (2)
- Kenya (1)
- Morocco (1)
- Namibia (1)
- Portugal (1)
- Soviet Union (2)
- Spain (2)
- United States (1)
- West Germany (1)
- Yugoslavia (1)
