= Athletics at the 2000 Summer Olympics – Men's 400 metres hurdles =

Men's 400 metres hurdles at the Games of the XXVII Olympiad
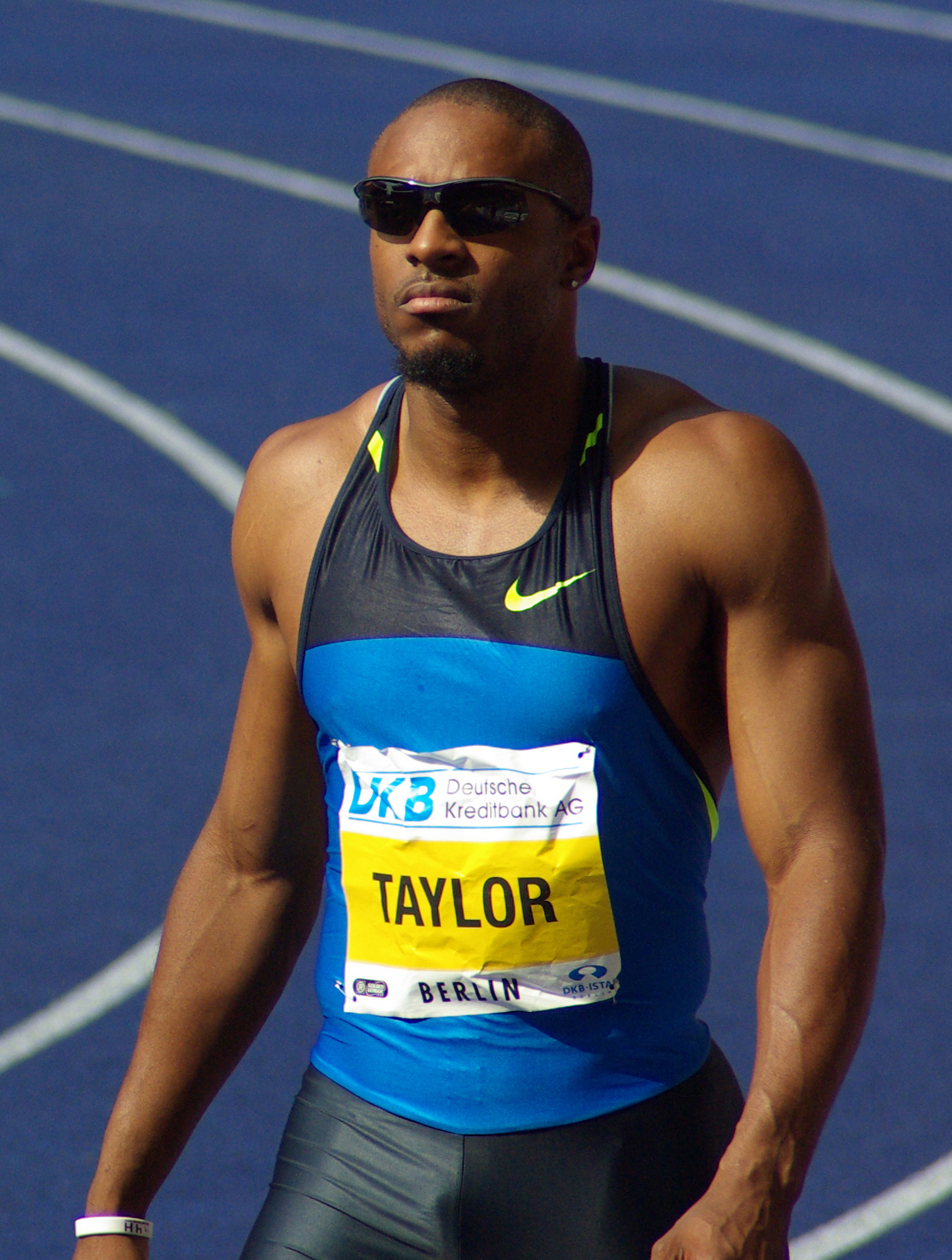
- Angelo Taylor (2008)
- Venue: Stadium Australia
- Date: 24 September 2000 (quarterfinals); 25 September 2000 (semifinals); 27 September 2000 (final)
- Competitors: 62 from 45 nations
- Winning time: 47.50

Medalists
1st place, gold medalist(s)		Angelo Taylor; United States
2nd place, silver medalist(s)		Hadi Souan Somayli; Saudi Arabia
3rd place, bronze medalist(s)		Llewellyn Herbert; South Africa

The men's 400 metres hurdles at the 2000 Summer Olympics as part of the athletics programme were held at Stadium Australia on Sunday 24 September, Monday 25 September and Wednesday 27 September 2000. There were 62 competitors from 45 nations. The event was won by 0.03 seconds by Angelo Taylor of the United States, the nation's fifth consecutive and 17th overall victory in the event. Saudi Arabia and South Africa each earned their first medals in the men's 400 metres hurdles, as Hadi Souan Somayli took silver and Llewellyn Herbert received bronze.

== Background ==
This was the 22nd time the event was held. It had been introduced along with the men's 200 metres hurdles in 1900, with the 200 being dropped after 1904 and the 400 being held through 1908 before being left off the 1912 programme. However, when the Olympics returned in 1920 after World War I, the men's 400 metres hurdles was back and would continue to be contested at every Games thereafter.

Four of the eight finalists from the 1996 Games returned: silver medalist Samuel Matete of Zambia, fifth-place finisher Rohan Robinson of Australia, sixth-place finisher Fabrizio Mori of Italy, and eighth-place finisher Eronilde de Araujo of Brazil. Mori had won the 1999 World Championship, but Angelo Taylor of the United States and Llewellyn Herbert of South Africa were the favorites.

Belarus, Chinese Taipei, Croatia, Cyprus, the Czech Republic, the Dominican Republic, Namibia, Ukraine, and Uzbekistan each made their debut in the event. The United States made its 21st appearance, most of any nation, having missed only the boycotted 1980 Games.

== Qualification ==
Each National Olympic Committee was permitted to enter up to three athletes that had run 49.90 seconds or faster during the qualification period. The maximum number of athletes per nation had been set at 3 since the 1930 Olympic Congress. If an NOC had no athletes that qualified under that standard, one athlete that had run 50.20 seconds or faster could be entered.

== Competition format ==
The competition used the three-round format used every Games since 1908 (except the four-round competition in 1952): quarterfinals, semifinals, and a final. The number of semifinals was expanded from 2 to 3. Ten sets of hurdles were set on the course. The hurdles were 3 feet (91.5 centimetres) tall and were placed 35 metres apart beginning 45 metres from the starting line, resulting in a 40 metres home stretch after the last hurdle. The 400 metres track was standard.

There were 8 quarterfinal heats with 7 or 8 athletes each. The top 2 men in each quarterfinal advanced to the semifinals along with the next fastest 8 overall. The 24 semifinalists were divided into 3 semifinals of 8 athletes each, with the top 2 in each semifinal and the next 2 fastest overall advancing to the 8-man final.

== Records ==
These were the standing world and Olympic records (in seconds) prior to the 1996 Summer Olympics.

World record	Kevin Young (USA)	46.78	Barcelona, Spain	6 August 1992
Olympic record	Kevin Young (USA)	46.78	Barcelona, Spain	6 August 1992

No new world or Olympic records were set during the competition.

== Schedule ==
All times are Australian Eastern Standard Time (UTC+10)

Date	Time	Round
Sunday, 24 September 2000	18:15	Quarterfinals
Monday, 25 September 2000	19:45	Semifinals
Wednesday, 27 September 2000	20:35	Final

== Results ==
All times shown are in seconds.

=== Quarterfinals ===
==== Quarterfinal 1 ====
Rank	Lane	Athlete	Nation	Reaction	Time	Notes
1	8	Llewellyn Herbert	South Africa	0.171	49.25	Q
2	7	Thomas Goller	Germany	0.154	49.32	Q
3	3	Ruslan Mashchenko	Russia	0.255	50.01	q
4	4	Rohan Robinson	Australia	0.173	50.80	
5	5	Willie Smith	Namibia	0.156	50.89	
6	6	Carlos Zbinden	Chile	0.180	51.36	
7	2	Victor Houston	Barbados	0.179	51.51	

==== Quarterfinal 2 ====
Rank	Lane	Athlete	Nation	Reaction	Time	Notes
1	5	Fabrizio Mori	Italy	0.162	49.35	Q
2	8	Boris Gorban	Russia	0.195	49.44	Q
3	4	Félix Sánchez	Dominican Republic	0.142	49.70	q
4	6	Blair Young	Australia	0.193	49.75	q
5	2	Tien-Wen Chen	Chinese Taipei	0.180	49.93	q, NR
6	3	Erick Keter	Kenya	0.269	50.06	q, SB
7	1	Kazuhiko Yamazaki	Japan	0.177	50.15	
8	7	Yvon Rakotoarimiandry	Madagascar	0.185	50.15	

==== Quarterfinal 3 ====
Rank	Lane	Athlete	Nation	Reaction	Time	Notes
1	8	Angelo Taylor	United States	0.185	49.48	Q
2	6	Dinsdale Morgan	Jamaica	0.171	49.64	Q
3	4	Ibou Faye	Senegal	0.188	50.09	
4	7	Arijan Raja Ratnayake	Sri Lanka	0.346	50.43	
5	5	Erkinjon Isakov	Uzbekistan	0.182	50.71	
6	3	Hillary Kiprotich Maritim	Kenya	0.180	51.04	
7	2	Sylvester Omodiale	Nigeria	0.189	51.06	

==== Quarterfinal 4 ====
Rank	Lane	Athlete	Nation	Reaction	Time	Notes
1	8	Jiri Muzik	Czech Republic	0.216	50.11	Q
2	6	Eric Thomas	United States	0.170	50.16	Q
3	1	Periklis Iakovakis	Greece	0.165	50.20	
4	4	Hideaki Kawamura	Japan	0.172	50.68	
5	7	Vadim Zadoinov	Moldova	0.173	51.08	
6	2	Mustapha Sdad	Morocco	0.216	51.39	
7	3	Tom McGuirk	Ireland	0.183	51.73	
8	5	Lee Du-yeon	South Korea	0.192	52.61	

==== Quarterfinal 5 ====
Rank	Lane	Athlete	Nation	Reaction	Time	Notes
1	3	Christopher Rawlinson	Great Britain	0.184	51.30	Q
2	2	Paweł Januszewski	Poland	0.163	51.40	Q
3	7	Tibor Bedi	Hungary	0.169	51.54	
4	5	Kenneth Harnden	Zimbabwe	0.435	51.83	
5	4	Leonid Vershinin	Belarus	0.151	51.84	
6	1	Darko Juricic	Croatia	0.167	52.39	
7	6	Zahr-el-Din El-Najem	Syria	0.160	52.70	
8	8	Iliya Dzhivondov	Bulgaria	0.279	54.36	

==== Quarterfinal 6 ====
Rank	Lane	Athlete	Nation	Reaction	Time	Notes
1	1	Hadi Souan Somayli	Saudi Arabia	0.174	49.28	Q
2	7	James Carter	United States	0.174	49.41	Q
3	6	Alwyn Myburgh	South Africa	0.184	49.57	q
4	5	Pedro Rodrigues	Portugal	0.162	49.90	q
5	4	Anthony Borsumato	Great Britain	0.155	50.73	
6	3	Costas Pochanis	Cyprus	0.244	51.20	
7	8	Matthew Beckenham	Australia	0.176	51.27	
8	2	Ian Weakley	Jamaica	0.179	52.18	

==== Quarterfinal 7 ====
Rank	Lane	Athlete	Nation	Reaction	Time	Notes
1	1	Samuel Matete	Zambia	0.184	48.98	Q
2	5	Gennadiy Gorbenko	Ukraine	0.406	49.12	Q, PB
3	8	Matt Douglas	Great Britain	0.163	49.62	q
4	7	Kemel Thompson	Jamaica	0.241	50.40	
5	3	Zid Abou Hamed	Syria	0.117	50.74	
6	6	Paul Tucker	Guyana	0.354	50.92	
7	2	Radoslav Holubek	Slovakia	0.127	51.18	
8	4	Mowen Boino	Papua New Guinea	0.406	51.28	NR

==== Quarterfinal 8 ====
Rank	Lane	Athlete	Nation	Reaction	Time	Notes
1	8	Eronilde de Araújo	Brazil	0.179	50.06	Q
2	6	Giorgio Frinolli Puzzilli	Italy	0.179	50.27	Q
3	4	Vladislav Shiryayev	Russia	0.179	50.39	
4	5	Inigo Monreal	Spain	0.502	51.32	
5	7	Sinisa Pesa	FR Yugoslavia	0.165	52.14	
6	2	Curt Young	Panama	0.164	52.46	
7	3	Iain Harnden	Zimbabwe	0.287	54.01	
8	1	Dai Tamesue	Japan	0.256	1:01.81	

=== Semifinals ===
==== Semifinal 1 ====
Rank	Lane	Athlete	Nation	Reaction	Time	Notes
1	6	Hadi Souan Somayli	Saudi Arabia	0.316	48.14	Q, AR
2	4	Fabrizio Mori	Italy		48.40	Q, SB
3	5	Gennadiy Gorbenko	Ukraine	0.478	48.40	q, PB
4	7	Paweł Januszewski	Poland	0.244	48.42	q, SB
5	2	Eric Thomas	United States	0.188	49.25	
6	3	Thomas Goller	Germany	0.152	49.28	
7	1	Pedro Rodrigues	Portugal	0.163	49.48	SB
8	8	Tien-Wen Chen	Chinese Taipei	0.182	50.52	

==== Semifinal 2 ====
Rank	Lane	Athlete	Nation	Reaction	Time	Notes
1	4	Llewellyn Herbert	South Africa	0.153	48.38	Q
2	3	Angelo Taylor	United States	0.250	48.49	Q
3	7	Ruslan Mashchenko	Russia	0.177	48.49	
4	8	Blair Young	Australia	0.255	49.20	
5	5	Jiri Muzik	Czech Republic	0.277	49.23	
6	6	Chris Rawlinson	Great Britain	0.177	49.25	
7	1	Félix Sánchez	Dominican Republic	0.178	49.69	
8	2	Giorgio Frinolli Puzzilli	Italy	0.242	50.10	

==== Semifinal 3 ====
Rank	Lane	Athlete	Nation	Reaction	Time	Notes
1	3	James Carter	United States	0.202	48.48	Q
2	4	Eronilde de Araújo	Brazil	0.181	48.76	Q
3	6	Samuel Matete	Zambia	0.228	48.98	
4	1	Alwyn Myburgh	South Africa	0.202	49.25	
5	5	Boris Gorban	Russia	0.454	49.29	
6	8	Matt Douglas	Great Britain	0.177	49.53	
7	2	Dinsdale Morgan	Jamaica	0.166	50.23	
8	7	Erick Keter	Kenya	0.202	51.25	

=== Final ===
Rank	Lane	Athlete	Nation	Reaction	Time	Notes
1st place, gold medalist(s)	1	Angelo Taylor	United States	0.179	47.50	PB
2nd place, silver medalist(s)	4	Hadi Souan Somayli	Saudi Arabia	0.437	47.53	AR
3rd place, bronze medalist(s)	6	Llewellyn Herbert	South Africa	0.169	47.81	NR
4	5	James Carter	United States	0.421	48.04	PB
5	8	Eronilde de Araújo	Brazil	0.190	48.34	
6	2	Paweł Januszewski	Poland	0.149	48.44	
7	3	Fabrizio Mori	Italy	0.198	48.78	
8	7	Gennadiy Gorbenko	Ukraine	0.395	49.01	

== Results summary ==
Rank	Athlete	Nation	Quarterfinals	Semifinals	Final	Notes
1st place, gold medalist(s)	Angelo Taylor	United States	49.48	48.49	47.50	PB
2nd place, silver medalist(s)	Hadi Souan Somayli	Saudi Arabia	49.28	48.14	47.53	AR
3rd place, bronze medalist(s)	Llewellyn Herbert	South Africa	49.25	48.38	47.81	NR
4	James Carter	United States	49.41	48.48	48.04	PB
5	Eronilde de Araújo	Brazil	50.06	48.76	48.34	
6	Paweł Januszewski	Poland	51.40	48.42	48.44	SB
7	Fabrizio Mori	Italy	49.35	48.40	48.78	SB
8	Gennadiy Gorbenko	Ukraine	49.12	48.80	49.01	PB
9	Ruslan Mashchenko	Russia	50.01	48.94	Did not advance	
10	Samuel Matete	Zambia	49.98	48.98	Did not advance	
11	Blair Young	Australia	49.75	49.20	Did not advance	
12	Jiri Muzik	Czech Republic	50.11	49.23	Did not advance	
13	Alwyn Myburgh	South Africa	49.57	49.25	Did not advance	
13	Chris Rawlinson	Great Britain	51.30	49.25	Did not advance	
13	Eric Thomas	United States	50.16	49.25	Did not advance	
16	Thomas Goller	Germany	49.32	49.28	Did not advance	
17	Boris Gorban	Russia	49.44	49.29	Did not advance	
18	Pedro Rodrigues	Portugal	49.90	49.48	Did not advance	SB
19	Matt Douglas	Great Britain	49.62	49.53	Did not advance	
20	Félix Sánchez	Dominican Republic	49.70	49.69	Did not advance	
21	Giorgio Frinolli Puzzilli	Italy	50.27	50.10	Did not advance	
22	Dinsdale Morgan	Jamaica	49.64	50.23	Did not advance	
23	Tien-Wen Chen	Chinese Taipei	49.93	50.52	Did not advance	NR
24	Erick Keter	Kenya	50.06	51.25	Did not advance	SB
25	Ibou Faye	Senegal	50.09	Did not advance		
26	Yvon Rakotoarimiandry	Madagascar	50.15	Did not advance		
26	Kazuhiko Yamazaki	Japan	50.15	Did not advance		
28	Periklis Iakovakis	Greece	50.20	Did not advance		
29	Vladislav Shiryayev	Russia	50.39	Did not advance		
30	Kemel Thompson	Jamaica	50.40	Did not advance		
31	Arijan Raja Ratnayake	Sri Lanka	50.43	Did not advance		
32	Hideaki Kawamura	Japan	50.68	Did not advance		
33	Erkinjon Isakov	Uzbekistan	50.71	Did not advance		
34	Anthony Borsumato	Great Britain	50.73	Did not advance		
35	Zid Abou Hamed	Syria	50.74	Did not advance		
36	Rohan Robinson	Australia	50.80	Did not advance		
37	Willie Smith	Namibia	50.89	Did not advance		
38	Paul Tucker	Guyana	50.92	Did not advance		
39	Hillary Kiprotich Maritim	Kenya	51.04	Did not advance		
40	Sylvester Omodiale	Nigeria	51.06	Did not advance		
41	Vadim Zadoinov	Moldova	51.08	Did not advance		
42	Radoslav Holubek	Slovakia	51.18	Did not advance		
43	Costas Pochanis	Cyprus	51.20	Did not advance		
44	Matthew Beckenham	Australia	51.27	Did not advance		
45	Inigo Monreal	Spain	51.32	Did not advance		
46	Carlos Zbinden	Chile	51.36	Did not advance		
47	Mowen Boino	Papua New Guinea	51.28	Did not advance		NR
48	Mustapha Sdad	Morocco	51.39	Did not advance		
49	Victor Houston	Barbados	51.51	Did not advance		
50	Tibor Bedi	Hungary	51.54	Did not advance		
51	Tom McGuirk	Ireland	51.73	Did not advance		
52	Kenneth Harnden	Zimbabwe	51.83	Did not advance		
53	Leonid Vershinin	Belarus	51.84	Did not advance		
54	Sinisa Pesa	FR Yugoslavia	52.14	Did not advance		
55	Ian Weakley	Jamaica	52.18	Did not advance		
56	Darko Juricic	Croatia	52.39	Did not advance		
57	Curt Young	Panama	52.46	Did not advance		
58	Du-Yeon Lee	South Korea	52.61	Did not advance		
59	Zahr-Edin Al Najem	Syria	52.70	Did not advance		
60	Iain Harnden	Zimbabwe	54.01	Did not advance		
61	Iliya Dzhivondov	Bulgaria	54.36	Did not advance		
62	Dai Tamesue	Japan	1:01.81	Did not advance		
