= Zadoinov =

Slavic masculine surname

Zadoinov (Russian: Задойнов) is a Slavic masculine surname. Its feminine counterpart is Zadoinova. It may refer to

- Aliona Bolsova Zadoinova (born 1997), Spanish-Moldovan tennis player
- Vadim Zadoynov (born 1969), Moldovan hurdler
