= Gary Jennings =

Garry or Gary Jennings may refer to:

- Gary Jennings (author) (1928–1999), American novelist
- Garry Jennings, English rock guitarist active since 1985
- Gary Jennings (athlete) (born 1972), English Olympic hurdler
- Gary Jennings Jr. (born 1997), American football wide receiver
