= Cleverson da Silva =

Brazilian hurdler

Cleverson Oliveira da Silva Teixeira
Personal information
- Born: 5 September 1973 (age 52) Londrina, Brazil

Sport
- Sport: Track and field
Medal record
Representing Brazil
Pan American Games
Silver medal – second place	1999 Winnipeg	4x400m relay

Cleverson Oliveira da Silva Teixeira (born 5 September 1973) is a retired Brazilian athlete who specialised in the 400 metres hurdles. He won multiple medals at the continental level and jointly holds the South American Championships record in the 4 × 400 metres relay. He represented his country at the 1996 Summer Olympics failing to qualify for the semifinals.

His personal best is 49.10 seconds set in 1999.

== Competition record ==
Year	Competition	Venue	Position	Event	Notes
Representing Brazil
1991	South American Junior Championships	Asunción, Paraguay	1st	110 m hurdles	14.87
1991	South American Junior Championships	Asunción, Paraguay	1st	400 m hurdles	54.59
1992	South American Junior Championships	Lima, Peru	2nd	110 m hurdles	14.6
1992	World Junior Championships	Seoul, South Korea	20th (h)	110m hurdles	15.20
1992	World Junior Championships	Seoul, South Korea	—	4 × 100 m relay	DNF
1995	Universiade	Fukuoka, Japan	34th (h)	400 m hurdles	53.46
1996	Ibero-American Championships	Medellín, Colombia	4th	400 m hurdles	50.17
1996	Olympic Games	Atlanta, United States	48th (h)	400 m hurdles	51.23
1997	South American Championships	Mar del Plata, Argentina	2nd	400 m hurdles	49.85
1997	World Championships	Athens, Greece	39th (h)	400 m hurdles	50.63
1997	Universiade	Catania, Italy	–	400 m hurdles	DQ
1999	South American Championships	Bogotá, Colombia	2nd	400 m hurdles	49.50
1999	South American Championships	Bogotá, Colombia	1st	4 × 400 m relay	3:02.09
1999	Universiade	Palma de Mallorca, Spain	6th	400 m hurdles	49.28
1999	Pan American Games	Winnipeg, Canada	5th	400 m hurdles	49.10
1999	Pan American Games	Winnipeg, Canada	2nd	4 × 400 m relay	2:58.56
1999	World Championships	Seville, Spain	29th (h)	400 m hurdles	49.98
1999	World Championships	Seville, Spain	17th (h)	4 × 400 m relay	3:05.70
2002	Ibero-American Championships	Guatemala City, Guatemala	3rd	400 m hurdles	50.88
2003	South American Championships	Barquisimeto, Venezuela	2nd	400 m hurdles	50.35
2004	Ibero-American Championships	Huelva, Spain	6th	400 m hurdles	50.72
2005	South American Championships	Cali, Colombia	3rd	400 m hurdles	52.32
2006	Ibero-American Championships	Ponce, Puerto Rico	4th	400 m hurdles	51.01
