= Lancelot Gittens =

Guyanese athlete

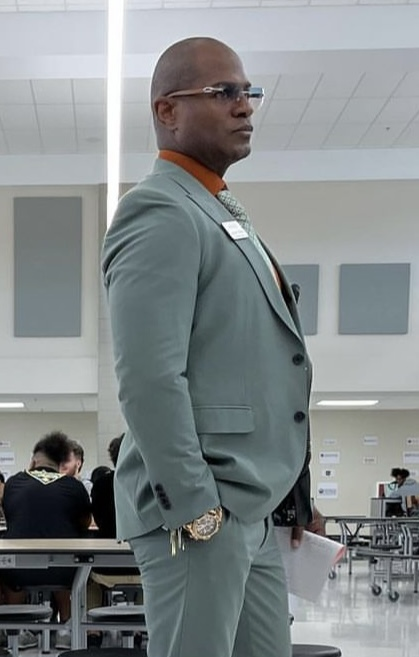
- Gittens at Eastside High School in 2023

Personal information
- Nationality: Guyanese
- Born: 28 October 1974 (age 51) Guyana
- Height: 172 cm (5 ft 8 in)
- Weight: 59 kg (130 lb)

Sport
- Country: Guyana
- Sport: Middle-distance running, hurdling

Lancelot Gittens (born 28 October 1974) is a Guyanese Olympic middle-distance runner and hurdler. He represented his country in the men's 400 metres hurdles at the 1996 Summer Olympics, as well as in the men's 4 × 400 metres relay. He qualified to run the 400IH with a time of 47.9. His clocked a time of 54.79 in the intermediate hurdles. His team's time was a 3:07.19 in the relay as he ran a split of 46.53. Gittens is currently an assistant principal at Eastside High School in Covington, Georgia.
