= Tom McGuirk =

Irish-American hurdler

Personal information
- Born: 2 March 1971 (age 55) San Francisco, United States
- Height: 1.78 m (5 ft 10 in)
- Weight: 75 kg (165 lb)

Sport
- Sport: Track and field
- Event: 400 metres hurdles
- College team: Cal Poly Mustangs California Golden Bears
- Club: Dublin City Harriers

Tom McGuirk (born 2 March 1971 in San Francisco, United States) is a retired Irish athlete who specialised in the 400 metres hurdles. He represented his country at the 1996 and 2000 Summer Olympics.

His personal best in the event is 49.73 seconds set in San Jose, California in 1996.

Nowadays he operates a bar in Half Moon Bay, California, with his older brother Patrick.

== Competition record ==
Year	Competition	Venue	Position	Event	Notes
Representing Ireland
1994	European Championships	Helsinki, Finland	18th (h)	400 m	47.14
1994	European Championships	Helsinki, Finland	27th (h)	400 m hurdles	50.84
1996	European Indoor Championships	Stockholm, Sweden	9th (sf)	400 m	47.66
1996	Olympic Games	Atlanta, United States	43rd (h)	400 m hurdles	50.76
1997	World Championships	Athens, Greece	32nd (h)	400 m hurdles	49.93
1998	European Championships	Budapest, Hungary	13th (sf)	400 m hurdles	51.12
2000	Olympic Games	Sydney, Australia	51st (h)	400 m hurdles	51.73
