= Kazuhiko Yamazaki =

Japanese hurdler (born 1971)

Personal information
- Nationality: Japanese
- Born: 10 May 1971 (age 55) Yono, Saitama, Japan
- Education: Juntendo University
- Height: 1.74 m (5 ft 9 in)
- Weight: 68 kg (150 lb)

Sport
- Country: Japan
- Sport: Track and field
- Event: 400 metres hurdles
- Retired: 2001

Achievements and titles
- Personal best: 48.26 (Osaka 1999)
Medal record
Men's athletics
Representing Japan
Asian Championships
Bronze medal – third place	1998 Fukuoka	400 m hurdles
East Asian Games
Gold medal – first place	1997 Busan	400 m hurdles
Universiade
Gold medal – first place	1995 Fukuoka	400 m hurdles

Kazuhiko Yamazaki (山崎 一彦, Yamazaki Kazuhiki; born 10 May 1971 in Yono) is a Japanese former athlete who specialised in the 400 metres hurdles. He competed in the 1992 Summer Olympics, in the 1996 Summer Olympics, and in the 2000 Summer Olympics. He also competed in the 1991 World Championships, in the 1995 World Championships, in the 1997 World Championships, and in the 1999 World Championships. He was a finalist at the 1995 World Championships and the first Japanese to reach the 400 metres hurdles final at the World Championships. He was the former Asian record holder in the 400 metres hurdles and a two-time Japanese Championships champion.

== Competition record ==
Year	Competition	Venue	Position	Event	Notes
Representing Japan
1990	Asian Junior Championships	Beijing, China	2nd	400 m hurdles	52.35
1990	Asian Junior Championships	Beijing, China	1st	4 × 400 m relay	3:12.47
1990	World Junior Championships	Plovdiv, Bulgaria	8th	400 m hurdles	51.42
1990	World Junior Championships	Plovdiv, Bulgaria	7th	4 × 400 m relay	3:07.58
1991	Universiade	Sheffield, United Kingdom	6th	400 m hurdles	50.53
1991	Universiade	Sheffield, United Kingdom	4th	4 × 400 m relay	3:07.82
1991	World Championships	Tokyo, Japan	21st (h)	400 m hurdles	49.97
1992	Olympic Games	Barcelona, Spain	29th (h)	400 m hurdles	50.30
1992	World Cup	Havana, Cuba	8th	110 m hurdles	14.83
1992	World Cup	Havana, Cuba	4th	400 m hurdles	50.13
1993	Universiade	Buffalo, United States	5th	400 m hurdles	50.34
1994	World Cup	London, United Kingdom	5th	400 m hurdles	50.22
1995	World Championships	Gothenburg, Sweden	7th	400 m hurdles	49.22
1995	World Championships	Gothenburg, Sweden	8th (h)	4 × 400 m relay	3:01.46
1995	Universiade	Fukuoka, Japan	1st	400 m hurdles	48.58
1995	Universiade	Fukuoka, Japan	4th	4 × 400 m relay	3:02.51
1996	Olympic Games	Atlanta, United States	15th (h)	400 m hurdles	49.07
1997	East Asian Games	Busan, South Korea	1st	400 m hurdles	49.60
1997	World Championships	Athens, Greece	20th (h)	400 m hurdles	49.47^{1}
1998	Asian Championships	Fukuoka, Japan	3rd	400 m hurdles	49.81
1999	World Championships	Seville, Spain	14th (sf)	400 m hurdles	49.46
1999	World Championships	Seville, Spain	10th (h)	4 × 400 m relay	3:02.50
2000	Olympic Games	Sydney, Australia	22nd (h)	400 m hurdles	50.15

^{1}Did not finish in the semifinals

== National titles ==
- Japanese Championships
  - 400 m hurdles: 1996, 1999
