= Ibou Faye =

Senegalese hurdler (1969–2025)

Personal information
- Nationality: Senegalese
- Born: 13 December 1969
- Died: 26 May 2025 (aged 55)
- Occupation: Athlete
Medal record
Men's athletics
Representing Senegal
African Championships
Gold medal – first place	1996 Yaoundé	400 m hurdles
Gold medal – first place	1996 Yaoundé	4×400 m
Gold medal – first place	1998 Dakar	4×400 m
Silver medal – second place	1992 Belle Vue Harel	4×400 m
Bronze medal – third place	1993 Durban	4×400 m
Bronze medal – third place	1998 Dakar	400 m hurdles

Ibou Faye (13 December 1969 – 26 May 2025) was a Senegalese athlete who mainly competed in the 400 metres hurdles. He died on 26 May 2025, at the age of 55.

== Competition record ==
Year	Competition	Venue	Position	Event	Notes
Representing Senegal
1989	Jeux de la Francophonie	Casablanca, Morocco	1st	4x400 m relay	3:04.69
1991	Universiade	Sheffield, United Kingdom	17th (h)	800 m	1:53.49
1993	African Championships	Durban, South Africa	3rd	4x400 m relay	3:06.38
1994	Jeux de la Francophonie	Paris, France	3rd	400 m hurdles	50.25
1995	World Championships	Gothenburg, Sweden	43rd (h)	400 m hurdles	52.20
1995	World Championships	Gothenburg, Sweden	16th (h)	4x400 m relay	3:05.15
1995	All-Africa Games	Harare, Zimbabwe	1st	400 m hurdles	49.12
1996	African Championships	Yaoundé, Cameroon	1st	400 m hurdles	49.60
1996	African Championships	Yaoundé, Cameroon	1st	4x400 m relay	3:03.44
1996	Olympic Games	Atlanta, United States	13th (sf)	400 m hurdles	48.84
1996	Olympic Games	Atlanta, United States	4th	4x400 m relay	3:00.64
1997	World Championships	Athens, Greece	–	400 m hurdles	DNF
1998	African Championships	Dakar, Senegal	3rd	400 m hurdles	49.59
1998	African Championships	Dakar, Senegal	1st	4x400 m relay	3:04.20
1999	World Championships	Seville, Spain	15th (h)	400 m hurdles	49.48
1999	World Championships	Seville, Spain	7th	4x400 m relay	3:03.80
1999	All-Africa Games	Johannesburg, South Africa	1st	400 m hurdles	48.30
1999	All-Africa Games	Johannesburg, South Africa	4th	4x400 m relay	3:02.14
2000	Olympic Games	Sydney, Australia	20th (h)	400 m hurdles	50.09
2000	Olympic Games	Sydney, Australia	13th (sf)	4x400 m relay	3:02.94
2001	World Championships	Edmonton, Canada	24th (h)	400 m hurdles	50.26
2003	All-Africa Games	Abuja, Nigeria	3rd	400 m hurdles	50.89
2003	All-Africa Games	Abuja, Nigeria	4th	4x400 m relay	3:07.85
2003	Afro-Asian Games	Hyderabad, India	2nd	400 m hurdles	50.08
2005	Islamic Solidarity Games	Mecca, Saudi Arabia	DNF	400 m hurdles	DNF
2005	Islamic Solidarity Games	Mecca, Saudi Arabia	4th	4x400 m relay	3:12.11
2005	Jeux de la Francophonie	Niamey, Niger	1st	400 m hurdles	50.67
2005	Jeux de la Francophonie	Niamey, Niger	3rd	4x400 m relay	3:11.37

Olympic Games
Preceded by Lamine Guèye	Flagbearer for Senegal; 1996 Atlanta	Succeeded by Mame Tacko Diouf
