= Calvin Davis =

American athlete (1972–2023)

- Davis in 2012

Personal information
- Born: April 2, 1972 Eutaw, Alabama, U.S.
- Died: May 1, 2023 (aged 51) Springdale, Arkansas, U.S.
Medal record
Men's track and & field
Representing the United States
Olympic Games
Bronze medal – third place	1996 Atlanta	400 m hurdles
World Indoor Championships
Gold medal – first place	1995 Barcelona	4 × 400 m relay

Calvin Davis (April 2, 1972 – May 1, 2023) was an American athlete who competed mainly in the 400 meters, though his fame came from his success in the 400 meter hurdles.

== Early life and education ==
Davis ran for the United States at the 1996 Summer Olympics in Atlanta, where he won the bronze medal in the men's 400 meter hurdles event.

Davis attended Dorchester High School in Boston. At Dorchester High School he made a name for himself in both track and football. Calvin has most of the Dorchester High track records. For example, he holds the 200 record at 21.6 the 300-yard at 31.2 and the 400 meter at 47.7. He also was an outstanding football player. In his senior year the Dorchester Football team played in the Super Bowl. He scored the winning touchdown that clinched the Super bowl for DHS. He was also chosen to play in the prestigious Shriners Game and caught two touchdown passes. He was heavily recruited out of high school and eventually made his way to the University of Arkansas.

Davis competed collegiately for the University of Arkansas, primarily as a flat 400 meter sprinter, not learning the hurdles until later. He won the NCAA Indoor 400 meter title in 1993 and 1994. In 2013, he was inducted into the University of Arkansas Athletic Hall of Honor. Davis died on May 1, 2023, at the age of 51.

== Rankings ==
Davis stayed among the best 400 meter hurdlers in the US for a number of years, as evidenced by his rankings from Track and Field News.

Year	Event	World rank	US rank
1996	400 m Hurdles	4th	3rd
1997	400 m Hurdles	–	7th
1998	400 m Hurdles	–	4th
1999	400 m Hurdles	10th	4th
2000	400 m Hurdles	–	6th
2001	400 m Hurdles	–	4th
