= Derrick Adkins =

American hurdler (born 1970)

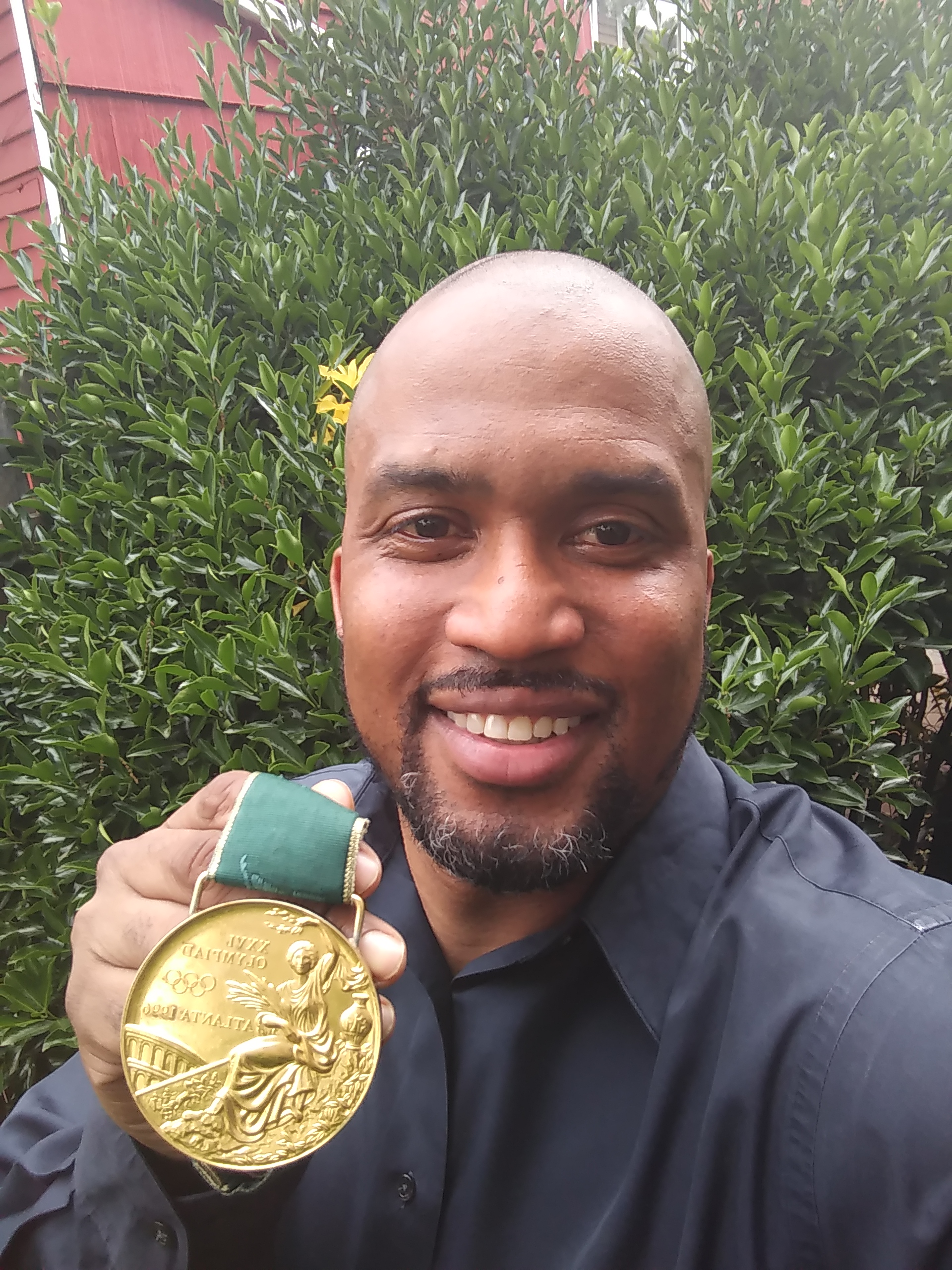
- Adkins in 2018

Personal information
- Full name: Derrick Ralph Adkins
- Born: July 2, 1970 (age 56) Brooklyn, New York, U.S.
Medal record
Men's athletics
Representing the United States
Olympic Games
Gold medal – first place	1996 Atlanta	400 m hurdles
World Championships
Gold medal – first place	1995 Gothenburg	400 m hurdles
Summer Universiade
Gold medal – first place	1991 Sheffield	400 m hurdles
Gold medal – first place	1993 Buffalo	400 m hurdles
- Updated on December 6, 2013

Derrick Ralph Adkins (born July 2, 1970) is an American former track and field athlete who specialized in the 400-meter hurdles. He was an Olympic gold medalist in that event at the 1996 Summer Olympics and World Champion at the 1995 World Championships in Athletics. He was the fastest man in the world in the 1994 and 1996 seasons, and holds a personal record of 47.54 seconds. Adkins was a two-time national champion at the USA Outdoor Track and Field Championships.

A Georgia Institute of Technology alumnus, he won back-to-back gold medals at the Summer Universiade from 1991 to 1993. He was also a gold medalist at the 1994 Goodwill Games and the 1996 IAAF Grand Prix Final. He represented the United States four times at the World Championships in Athletics, also reaching the final in 1991 and 1993.

Following his competitive retirement he remained connected with the sport and served as director of The Armory Track and Field Center between 2006 and 2011.

== Biography ==
=== Early life ===
Born in Brooklyn, New York, Adkins was raised in Lakeview, New York in Long Island where he attended Malverne High School, graduating in 1988. That year he was ranked as the number one high school 400-meter hurdler in the nation, having run the race in 50.71 seconds. He attended Georgia Tech where he earned a bachelor's degree at the George W. Woodruff School of Mechanical Engineering in June 1993. He also earned a certificate in biomedical engineering. Coached by Buddy Fowlkes and Grover Hinsdale at Georgia Tech, he became a six-time All American in the 400-meter hurdles and in the 4 × 400-meter relay.

His first international success was a gold medal double in the 400 m hurdles and 4 × 400-meter relay at the 1989 Pan American Junior Athletics Championships.

=== Senior career ===
Adkins reached his first senior global final at the 1991 World Championships in Athletics, placed sixth overall. He returned two years later at the 1993 World Championships in Athletics, ending in seventh on that occasion. His first major title followed at the 1994 Goodwill Games in Saint Petersburg, where he ran a games record time of 47.86 seconds to claim the gold. Adkins was runner-up to Samuel Matete at the 1994 IAAF Grand Prix Final that year.

At the 1995 World Championships in Goteborg, Sweden, Adkins won the gold narrowly ahead of his career long rival Samuel Matete from Zambia in a time of 47.98 seconds. In the beginning of the 1996 season Matete beat Adkins four times in a row. Then just before the Games in Atlanta, Adkins defeated Matete in the Paris Grand Prix at the Stade de France in a time of 47.70.

At the Olympic Games in Atlanta, Adkins won the gold medal in a time of 47.54, beating Matete by 0.24 seconds.

In his career Adkins broke the 48-second barrier 20 times. He is one of the few hurdlers who have won back-to-back gold medals in the World Championships and Olympic Games. He was a two-time USA National Champion in 1994 and 1995. He was a two-time winner of the Weltklasse Zurich meet, having won the 1995 meet in a time of 47.65 seconds. He was a two-time winner of the Millrose Games in the 500 meters having run 1:01.71 at Madison Square Garden. He has set stadium records and meet records at the Penn Relays, the Lucerne Grand Prix (47.68), the Linz Grand Prix (47.70), and the Goodwill Games in St. Petersburg, Russia (47.86).

He ceased to compete internationally after 2000 and made his last appearance at the national championships in 2004, pulling up in the heats of the 400 m hurdles.

=== Post-competitive career ===
In October 1996, local authorities of his hometown of Lakeview lobbied to change the name of the street where he was raised, from Seneca Road to Derrick Adkins Lane.

Adkins served as an assistant track & field coach at Columbia University between 2004 and 2006. While coaching at Columbia, his athletes set seven school records and won six Ivy League individual-event championships.

Adkins served as director of The Armory Track and Field Center between 2006 and 2011. During his time at The Armory, the organization began hosting more than 100 track meets per year. He was influential in the decision to bring the Millrose Games from Madison Square Garden to The Armory where it continues to be staged annually.

At the Armory Track & Field Center, Adkins also served as the Director of Armory College Prep, a college readiness program which served the student-athletes who attended the center. Students were provided college counseling services, academic tutoring, and SAT preparation instruction.

He was inducted into the Nassau County Sports Hall of Fame in 2009.

== Personal issues ==
In 2009, Adkins was arrested for driving while intoxicated. He admits to having suffered a long-term battle with clinical depression and alcohol addiction.

In 2013, Adkins was arrested for obstruction of governmental administration in Long Beach, New York. The charges were dismissed. The initial charge was that he was running and walking in the wrong lanes on a boardwalk. In court, it was revealed that there were never any lanes on the boardwalk. The arresting officer never appeared in court. The Nassau County Public Corruption Bureau investigated the case and thereafter issued a written admonishment to the Long Beach Police Department.

On December 17, 2022, the New York Times published an article wherein Adkins states that his depression emerged from head injuries which he had experienced as an athlete due to hurdle collisions.

== Personal records ==
Outdoor

- 100-meter dash – 10.48 (1994)
- 400-meter dash – 46.42 (1997)
- 110-meter hurdles – 13.69 (1992)
- 400-meter hurdles – 47.54 (1995)

Indoor

- 400-meter dash – 46.37 (1994)
- 500-meter dash – 1:01.70 (1995)
- 60-meter hurdles – 8.22 (1998)

=== Season's bests ===
Rankings from Track and Field Statistics

Year	Time	Rank
2003	49.73	
2002	49.67	
2001	50.42	
2000	49.84	
1999	48.71	22
1998	48.72	20
1997	48.00	6
1996	47.54	1
1995	47.54	3
1994	47.70	1
1993	48.39	6
1992	48.64	12
1991	48.60	8
1990	49.53	25
1989	50.25	
1988	50.71	

== International competitions ==
Year	Competition	Venue	Position	Event	Notes
1989	Pan American Junior Championships	Santa Fe, Argentina	1st	400 m hurdles	50.92
1989	Pan American Junior Championships	Santa Fe, Argentina	1st	4 × 400 m relay	3:11.76
1991	Universiade	Sheffield, United Kingdom	1st	400 m hurdles	49.01
1991	World Championships	Tokyo, Japan	6th	400 m hurdles	49.28
1993	Universiade	Amherst, United States	1st	400 m hurdles	49.35
1993	World Championships	Stuttgart, Germany	7th	400 m hurdles	49.07
1994	Goodwill Games	Saint Petersburg, Russia	1st	400 m hurdles	47.86 GR
1994	Grand Prix Final	Paris, France	2nd	400 m hurdles	48.05
1995	World Championships	Gothenburg, Sweden	1st	400 m hurdles	47.98
1996	Olympic Games	Atlanta, United States	1st	400 m hurdles	47.54
1996	Grand Prix Final	Milan, Italy	1st	400 m hurdles	48.63
1997	World Championships	Athens, Greece	5th (semis)	400 m hurdles	48.95
1998	Goodwill Games	Uniondale, United States	8th	400 m hurdles	49.74

== National titles ==
- USA Outdoor Track and Field Championships
  - 400 m hurdles: 1994, 1995

== Circuit wins ==
- Weltklasse Zürich: 1994, 1995, 1996
- Bislett Games: 1994, 1996
- DN Galan: 1994
- Athletissima: 1994
- Spitzen Leichtathletik Luzern: 1994, 1995
- Meeting de Paris: 1995, 1996
- Znamenskiy Memorial: 1995
- London Grand Prix: 1995
- Herculis: 1995
- Memorial Van Damme: 1996
- Osaka Grand Prix: 1997

== See also ==
- List of Olympic medalists in athletics (men)
- List of World Championships in Athletics medalists (men)
- List of 1996 Summer Olympics medal winners
- 400 metres hurdles at the Olympics
- 400 metres hurdles at the World Championships in Athletics
- List of male hurdlers
- List of Georgia Institute of Technology athletes

Sporting positions
Preceded by Kevin Young; Stéphane Diagana	Men's 400 m Hurdles Best Year Performance; 1994; 1996	Succeeded by Stéphane Diagana; Bryan Bronson
