= Athletics at the 1990 Commonwealth Games – Men's 400 metres hurdles =

Men's 400 metres hurdles at the Commonwealth Games

The men's 400 metres hurdles event at the 1990 Commonwealth Games was held on 28 and 29 January at the Mount Smart Stadium in Auckland.

== Medalists ==
Gold	Silver	Bronze
Kriss Akabusi; England	Gideon Yego; Kenya	John Graham; Canada

== Results ==
=== Heats ===
Qualification: First 4 of each heat (Q) and the next 1 fastest (q) qualified for the final.

Rank	Heat	Name	Nationality	Time	Notes
1	1	Gideon Yego	Kenya	49.26	Q
2	1	Henry Amike	Nigeria	49.27	Q
3	1	Samuel Matete	Zambia	49.42	Q
4	2	Kriss Akabusi	England	49.86	Q
5	1	Leigh Miller	Australia	50.01	Q
6	2	Joseph Maritim	Kenya	50.15	Q
7	2	Barnabas Kinyor	Kenya	50.29	Q
8	1	Lawrence Lynch	England	50.34	q
9	2	John Graham	Canada	50.46	Q
10	2	Stephen Hawkins	England	50.95	
10	2	Rohan Robinson	Australia	51.05	
11	1	Simon Hollingsworth	Australia	51.54	
12	1	Mark Davidson	Scotland	52.17	
13	1	Shaun McAlmont	Canada	52.24	
14	1	Giovanny Fanny	Seychelles	52.85	
15	2	Bashir Ahmed	Pakistan	53.42	
	2	Wayne Paul	New Zealand	DNF	

=== Final ===
Rank	Lane	Name	Nationality	Time	Notes
1st place, gold medalist(s)	4	Kriss Akabusi	England	48.89	
2nd place, silver medalist(s)	5	Gideon Yego	Kenya	49.25	
3rd place, bronze medalist(s)	9	John Graham	Canada	50.24	
4	8	Leigh Miller	Australia	50.25	
5	3	Samuel Matete	Zambia	50.34	
6	7	Joseph Maritim	Kenya	50.54	
7	2	Barnabas Kinyor	Kenya	50.73	
8	1	Lawrence Lynch	England	51.51	
	6	Henry Amike	Nigeria	DQ	
