= Vladislav Shiryayev =

Russian hurdler

Personal information
- Born: 30 October 1973 (age 52) Miass, Soviet Union
- Height: 1.88 m (6 ft 2 in)
- Weight: 80 kg (176 lb)

Sport
- Sport: Track and field
- Event: 400 metres hurdles
- Club: Spartak

Vladislav Shiryayev (Russian: Владислав Ширяев; born 30 October 1973 in Miass) is a retired Russian athlete who specialised in the 400 metres hurdles. He represented his country at the 2000 Summer Olympics, as well as two World Championships. In addition, he finished eighth at the 1998 European Championships.

His personal best in the event is 49.02 seconds set in Tula in 2000.

== Competition record ==
| Year | Competition | Venue | Position | Event | Notes |
Representing Russia
| 1997 | World Championships | Athens, Greece | 33rd (h) | 400 m hurdles | 49.95 |
| 1997 | Universiade | Catania, Italy | – | 400 m hurdles | DQ |
| 1998 | Goodwill Games | Uniondale, United States | 4th | 4 × 400 m relay | 3:06.53 |
| 1998 | European Championships | Budapest, Hungary | 8th | 400 m hurdles | 50.94 |
| 1998 | European Championships | Budapest, Hungary | – | 4 × 400 m relay | DNF |
| 1999 | World Championships | Seville, Spain | 35th (h) | 400 m hurdles | 50.34 |
| 2000 | Olympic Games | Sydney, Australia | 27th (h) | 400 m hurdles | 50.39 |
