= Lee Du-yeon =

South Korean hurdler

Personal information
- Nationality: South Korean
- Born: April 9, 1975 (age 51) South Korea

Korean name
- Hangul: 이두연
- Hanja: 李斗連
- RR: I Duyeon
- MR: I Tuyŏn

Sport
- Sport: Track and field
- Event: 400 metres hurdles

Lee Du-yeon (Korean: 이두연; born April 9, 1975) is a South Korean hurdler. He competed in the men's 400 metres hurdles at the 2000 Summer Olympics.

Lee attended South Chungcheong Sports High School. (Note: Korean: 충남체육고등학교; Hanja: 忠南體育高等學校; RR: Chungnam Cheyuk Godeunghakgyo) He represented his school at the 74th Korean National Sports Festival in 1993, where he came in first place and set the festival record in the high school men's 400 metres hurdles with a time of 52.97 seconds. He went on to attend Sungkyunkwan University, and while a student there came in first place at the 51st National Track Championships (Note: 전국육상경기선수권대회; 全國陸上競技選手權大會; Jeonguk Yuksang Gyeonggi Seonsugwon Daehoe) in 1997 in the men's 400 metres hurdles with a time of 51.64 seconds. By 1999 he was in mandatory military service, and competed at the 53rd National Track Championships as a member of the Korea Armed Forces Athletic Corps, again taking 1st place with a time of 50.79 seconds. He was living in Seocheon County, South Chungcheong Province when he was chosen for the South Korean team at the 2000 Summer Olympics.

After retiring from competition, in 2008 he founded the Nonsan municipal employees' track team and became its first coach, eventually leading them to victory at the 24th National Workplace Teams Track Competition (Note: 전국실업단대항 육상경기대회; 全國實業團隊項陸上競技大會; Jeonguk Sireop Dandaehang Yuksang Gyeonggi Daehoe) in 2012. He later became the track coach at his alma mater Sungkyunkwan University. In 2017 the Gyeonggi Provincial Track Federation. (Note: 경기도육상연맹; 京畿道陸上聯盟; Gyeonggi-do Yuksang Yeonmaeng) honoured him with the "best coach" award.
