= Rohan Robinson =

Australian hurdler (born 1971)

Personal information
- Nationality: Australian
- Born: 15 November 1971 (age 54) Melbourne, Australia
- Height: 188 cm (6 ft 2 in)
- Weight: 79 kg (174 lb)

Sport
- Sport: Athletics
- Event: Hurdles
- Club: Glenhuntly AC
Medal record
Representing Australia
Commonwealth Games
Silver medal – second place	1998 Kuala Lumpur	400 m hurdles

Rohan Stuart Robinson (born 15 November 1971) is an Australian retired hurdler who competed at the 1996 Summer Olympics and the 2000 Summer Olympics.

His personal best time was 48.28 seconds, achieved in the 2nd semi-final at the 1996 Olympic Games in Atlanta. This is the current Oceanian record.

He won the British AAA Championships title in the 400 metres hurdles event at the 1995 AAA Championships.

He is the owner of his own company Silk Projects.

== International competitions ==
Year	Competition	Venue	Position	Event	Notes
Representing Australia
1990	Commonwealth Games	Auckland, New Zealand	10th (h)	400 m hurdles	51.05
1990	World Junior Championships	Plovdiv, Bulgaria	1st	400m hurdles	49.73
1990	World Junior Championships	Plovdiv, Bulgaria	3rd	4 × 400 m relay	3:05.51
1991	World Indoor Championships	Seville, Spain	4th	4 × 400 m relay	3:08.49
1991	World Championships	Tokyo, Japan	10th (h)	4 × 400 m relay	3:02.42
1993	Universiade	Buffalo, United States	6th	400 m hurdles	50.38
1993	Universiade	Buffalo, United States	4th	4 × 400 m relay	3:06.24
1993	World Championships	Stuttgart, Germany	14th (sf)	400 m hurdles	49.36
1994	Commonwealth Games	Victoria, Canada	5th	400 m hurdles	49.76
1994	World Cup	London, United Kingdom	7th	400 m hurdles	51.12
1995	World Championships	Gothenburg, Sweden	20th (h)	400 m hurdles	49.63
1995	World Championships	Gothenburg, Sweden	13th (h)	4 × 400 m relay	3:03.07
1996	Olympic Games	Atlanta, United States	5th	400 m hurdles	48.30
1997	World Championships	Athens, Greece	44th (h)	400 m hurdles	51.67
1997	Universiade	Catania, Italy	8th	400 m hurdles	52.89
1998	Goodwill Games	Uniondale, United States	6th	400 m hurdles	48.81
1998	Commonwealth Games	Kuala Lumpur, Malaysia	2nd	400 m hurdles	48.99
2000	Olympic Games	Sydney, Australia	34th (h)	400 m hurdles	50.80
