= Paweł Januszewski =

Polish hurdler

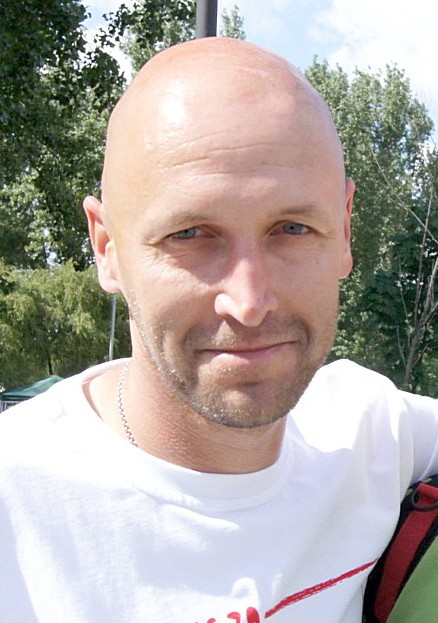
- Paweł Januszewski in 2012

Personal information
- Born: 2 January 1972 (age 54) Pyrzyce, Poland
- Height: 1.80 m (5 ft 11 in)
- Weight: 74 kg (163 lb)

Sport
- Sport: Track and field
- Event: 400 metres hurdles
- Club: Skra Warszawa
Medal record
Men's Athletics
Representing Poland
European Championships
Gold medal – first place	1998 Budapest	400 m hurdles
Bronze medal – third place	2002 Munich	400 m hurdles
Summer Universiade
Gold medal – first place	1999 Palma de Mallorca	400 m hurdles

Paweł Januszewski (born 2 January 1972) is a retired hurdler from Poland, who is best known for winning the gold medal at the 1998 European Championships. A gold medalist at the 1999 Summer Universiade, he represented his native country in two consecutive Summer Olympics (1996 and 2000), reaching the final on the second occasion. In addition, he competed at four World Championships, qualifying for the final in 1999 and 2001.

Januszewski was born in Pyrzyce. He set his personal best (48.17s) in the men's 400 metres hurdles on 20 August 1998, in his winning race in Budapest, Hungary. It was the national record until 2007, when the mark was bettered by Marek Plawgo, and remains the second best result by a Polish athlete.

== Competition record ==
Year	Competition	Venue	Position	Event	Notes
Representing Poland
1991	European Junior Championships	Thessaloniki, Greece	2nd	4 × 400 m relay	3:08.18
1994	European Championships	Helsinki, Finland	12th (sf)	400 m hurdles	49.95
1995	World Championships	Gothenburg, Sweden	15th (h)	400 m hurdles	49.43
1995	World Championships	Gothenburg, Sweden	5th	4 × 400 m relay	3:03.84
1995	Universiade	Fukuoka, Japan	6th (sf)	400 m hurdles	49.64
1995	Universiade	Fukuoka, Japan	6th	4 × 400 m relay	3:05.08
1996	Olympic Games	Atlanta, United States	24th (h)	400 m hurdles	49.63
1996	Olympic Games	Atlanta, United States	3rd (h)	4 × 400 m relay	3:01.92
1997	World Championships	Athens, Greece	13th (sf)	400 m hurdles	48.94
1997	Universiade	Catania, Italy	12th (sf)	400 m hurdles	49.69
1997	Universiade	Catania, Italy	9th (h)	4 × 400 m relay	3:09.17
1998	European Championships	Budapest, Hungary	1st	400 m hurdles	48.17 (NR)
1999	Universiade	Palma de Mallorca, Spain	1st	400 m hurdles	48.64
1999	World Championships	Seville, Spain	5th	400 m hurdles	48.19
2000	Olympic Games	Sydney, Australia	6th	400 m hurdles	48.44
2001	World Championships	Edmonton, Canada	6th	400 m hurdles	48.57
2001	Goodwill Games	Brisbane, Australia	5th	400 m hurdles	49.27
2001	Goodwill Games	Brisbane, Australia	3rd	4 × 400 m relay	3:04.79
2002	European Championships	Munich, Germany	3rd	400 m hurdles	48.46
