= Ken Harnden =

Zimbabwean track and field coach and former hurdler

Medal record

Men's athletics

Representing Zimbabwe

African Championships
Silver medal – second place	1998 Dakar	400 m hurdles
Silver medal – second place	1998 Dakar	4×400 m

Kenneth “Ken” Harnden (born 31 March 1973 in Salisbury – now Harare) is a Zimbabwean track and field coach and former hurdler who specialized in the 400 metres hurdles.

His personal best time is 48.05 seconds, achieved in July 1998 in Paris. Together with Tawanda Chiwira, Phillip Mukomana and Savieri Ngidhi he holds the Zimbabwean record in 4 x 400 metres relay with 3:00.79 minutes, achieved during the heats at the 1997 World Championships in Athens. Harnden also competed for Zimbabwe in both the 1996 and 2000 Summer Olympics.

Competing for the North Carolina Tar Heels track and field program, Harnden won the 1995 NCAA Division I Outdoor Track and Field Championships title in the 400 m hurdles.

Under his tutelage, sophomore Walter Dix won the NCAA indoor and outdoor 200m National Championships, became a five-time All-American, a two-time NCAA East Region title holder in the 100m and 200m, six-time individual ACC Championship winner, and holds six All-ACC accolades in addition to shattering numerous school, league and world records. Fellow rookie sprinter Ricardo Chambers broke Harnden's longstanding Mike Long Track Record in the 400m while his 4x100m relay earned All-American honors for the second consecutive season. Zimbabwean 200m sprint record holder and All Africa games medalist Brian Dzingai. In his first two seasons, his 400m relay squads have finished in the top three on FSU's all-time list.

== Competition record ==
Year	Competition	Venue	Position	Event	Notes
Representing Zimbabwe
1994	Commonwealth Games	Victoria, Canada	6th	400 m hurdles	50.02
1994	Commonwealth Games	Victoria, Canada	9th (h)	4x400 m relay	3:07.50
1995	World Championships	Gothenburg, Sweden	6th	400 m hurdles	48.89
1995	World Championships	Gothenburg, Sweden	15th (h)	4x400 m relay	3:03.91
1996	Olympic Games	Atlanta, United States	12th (sf)	400 m hurdles	48.61
1996	Olympic Games	Atlanta, United States	28th (h)	4x400 m relay	3:13.35
1997	World Championships	Athens, Greece	11th (sf)	400 m hurdles	48.82
1997	World Championships	Athens, Greece	6th	4x400 m relay	3:01.43
1998	African Championships	Dakar, Senegal	2nd	400 m hurdles	49.39
1998	Commonwealth Games	Kuala Lumpur, Malaysia	3rd	400 m hurdles	49.06
1998	Commonwealth Games	Kuala Lumpur, Malaysia	6th	4x400 m relay	3:03.02
1999	World Championships	Seville, Spain	24th (h)	400 m hurdles	49.72
1999	World Championships	Seville, Spain	19th (h)	4x400 m relay	3:07.69
1999	All-Africa Games	Johannesburg, South Africa	2nd	400 m hurdles	48.47
1999	All-Africa Games	Johannesburg, South Africa	5th	4x400 m relay	3:02.18
2000	Olympic Games	Sydney, Australia	52nd (h)	400 m hurdles	51.83
2000	Olympic Games	Sydney, Australia	15th (h)	4x400 m relay	3:05.60
