= Gilbert Hashan =

Personal information
- Nationality: Mauritian
- Born: 12 January 1970 (age 56) Mauritius
- Height: 175 cm (5 ft 9 in)
- Weight: 70 kg (154 lb)

Sport
- Country: Mauritius
- Sport: Middle-distance running, hurdling
Medal record
Men's athletics
Representing Mauritius
African Championships
Bronze medal – third place	1996 Yaoundé	4×400 m

Gilbert Hashan (born 12 January 1970) is a Mauritian Olympic middle-distance runner and hurdler. He represented his country in the men's 400 metres hurdles at the 1996 Summer Olympics, as well as in the men's 4 × 400 metres relay. His time was a 49.94 in the hurdles, and his team's time was a 3:08.17 in the relay.
