= Éverson Teixeira =

Brazilian sprinter (born 1974)

Personal information
- Full name: Éverson da Silva Teixeira
- Born: 23 November 1974 (age 51) Santos, São Paulo, Brazil
- Height: 1.85 m (6 ft 1 in)
- Weight: 72 kg (159 lb)

Sport
- Sport: Sprinting
- Event: 4 × 400 metres relay
- Club: SESI
Medal record
Representing Brazil
Pan American Games
Silver medal – second place	1995 Mar del Plata	400m hurdles

Éverson da Silva Teixeira (born 23 November 1974) is a Brazilian sprinter. He competed in the men's 4 × 400 metres relay at the 1996 Summer Olympics.
