= Thomas Goller =

German hurdler (born 1977)

Thomas Goller (born 28 October 1977 in Dohna, Bezirk Dresden) is a retired German hurdler. He was banned from competing for two years for doping.

== Biography ==
He won a bronze medal in a 4 × 400 metres relay at the 1997 European Athletics U23 Championships and two gold medals in the events of 400 metres hurdles and relay at the 1999 edition.

At senior level he competed at the 1998 European Championships (9th place in 400 m hurdles), the 1999 World Championships (15th in 400 m hurdles and 11th in relay) and the 2000 Summer Olympics (16th in 400 m hurdles) without reaching the final.

His personal best time was 48.54 seconds, achieved in June 1999 in Jena. This ranked him fifth on the German all-time list, behind Harald Schmid, Olaf Hense, Edgar Itt and Uwe Ackermann.

Goller represented the sports clubs Dresdner SC, LAZ Leipzig and LG Asics Pirna. He was the German Champion in 1998, 1999, 2000 and 2009 over the 400 metres hurdles.

In May 2010 it was proved that Thomas Goller had consumed Boldenone and Desoxymethyltestosterone. The DLV suspended him and TV Wattenscheid 01 terminated his contract. At a hearing in July 2010, he was given a two-year ban where he announced his retirement from the sport.

== See also ==
- List of doping cases in athletics
