= 1998 European Athletics Championships – Men's 400 metres hurdles =

Men's 400 metres hurdles at the European Athletics Championships

The men's 400 metres hurdles at the 1998 European Athletics Championships was held at the Népstadion on 18, 19 and 20 August.

== Medalists ==
Gold	Paweł Januszewski; Poland
Silver	Ruslan Mashchenko; Russia
Bronze	Fabrizio Mori; Italy

== Results ==
KEY:	q	Fastest non-qualifiers	Q	Qualified	NR	National record	PB	Personal best	SB	Seasonal best

=== Round 1 ===
Qualification: First 3 in each heat (Q) and the next 4 fastest (q) advance to the Semifinals.

Rank	Heat	Name	Nationality	Time	Notes
1	3	Carlos Silva	Portugal	49.00	Q, SB
2	3	Jiří Mužík	Czech Republic	49.15	Q
3	3	Paul Gray	Great Britain	49.16	Q, PB
4	3	Thomas Goller	Germany	49.22	q, PB
5	1	Stéphane Diagana	France	49.28	Q
6	2	Paweł Januszewski	Poland	49.47	Q, SB
7	2	Jimmy Coco	France	49.57	Q
8	1	Vadim Zadoynov	Moldova	49.58	Q, SB
9	2	Fabrizio Mori	Italy	49.63	Q
10	3	David Kafka	France	49.74	q, PB
11	3	Darko Juričić	Croatia	49.88	q, NR
12	3	Tom McGuirk	Ireland	49.92	q, PB
13	1	Vladislav Shiryayev	Russia	49.96	Q
14	2	Boris Gorban	Russia	50.04	
15	4	Ruslan Mashchenko	Russia	50.30	Q
16	1	Mário Reis	Portugal	50.39	
17	1	Siniša Peša	Yugoslavia	50.44	
18	2	Miro Kocuvan	Slovenia	50.54	
19	4	Tibor Bédi	Hungary	50.57	Q
20	4	Laurent Ottoz	Italy	50.58	Q
21	2	Petteri Pulkkinen	Finland	50.59	
22	1	Anthony Borsumato	Great Britain	50.91	
23	4	Iñigo Monreal	Spain	50.94	
24	4	Steffen Kolb	Germany	50.97	
25	4	Bartosz Gruman	Poland	51.06	
26	2	Chris Rawlinson	Great Britain	51.11	
27	4	Radoslav Holúbek	Slovakia	51.36	
	1	Egīls Tēbelis	Latvia	DNF	

=== Semifinals ===
Qualification: First 3 in each heat (Q) and the next 2 fastest (q) advance to the Final.

Rank	Heat	Name	Nationality	Time	Notes
1	1	Ruslan Mashchenko	Russia	48.64	Q
2	2	Paweł Januszewski	Poland	48.90	Q, NR
3	1	Carlos Silva	Portugal	48.98	Q, SB
4	1	Laurent Ottoz	Italy	49.06	Q, SB
5	2	Vadim Zadoynov	Moldova	49.26	Q, SB
6	2	Fabrizio Mori	Italy	49.34	Q
7	1	Jiří Mužík	Czech Republic	49.39	q
8	2	Vladislav Shiryayev	Russia	49.56	q
9	1	Thomas Goller	Germany	49.69	
10	2	Jimmy Coco	France	49.72	
11	1	Paul Gray	Great Britain	50.34	
12	2	Darko Juričić	Croatia	50.39	
13	2	Tom McGuirk	Ireland	51.12	
14	1	Tibor Bédi	Hungary	57.77	
	1	David Kafka	France	DNF	
	2	Stéphane Diagana	France	DNF	

=== Final ===
Rank	Name	Nationality	Time	Notes
1st place, gold medalist(s)	Paweł Januszewski	Poland	48.17	NR
2nd place, silver medalist(s)	Ruslan Mashchenko	Russia	48.25	
3rd place, bronze medalist(s)	Fabrizio Mori	Italy	48.71	
4	Carlos Silva	Portugal	49.02	
5	Vadim Zadoynov	Moldova	49.10	SB
6	Laurent Ottoz	Italy	49.15	
7	Jiří Mužík	Czech Republic	50.51	
8	Vladislav Shiryayev	Russia	50.94	
