= Jimmy Coco =

French hurdler

Personal information
- Born: 28 November 1972 (age 53) Les Abymes, France

Sport
- Sport: Track and field
Medal record
Representing France
Mediterranean Games
| Silver medal – second place | 1997 Bari | 4x400m relay |

Jimmy Coco (born 28 November 1972) is a retired French hurdler who specialized in the 400 metres hurdles.

He competed at the 1995 World Championships, the 1997 World Championships, the 1997 Summer Universiade and the 1998 European Championships without reaching the final. He also took a silver medal in the 4 x 400 metres relay at the 1997 Mediterranean Games.

He became French champion in 1995 and 1998.

His personal best time was 49.29 seconds, achieved in June 1998 in Saint-Denis.
