= Samuel Matete =

Zambian hurdler (born 1968)

Personal information
- Born: 27 July 1968 (age 58) Chingola, Zambia

Sport
- Sport: Track and field
Medal record
Representing Zambia
Olympic Games
Silver medal – second place	1996 Atlanta	400 m hurdles
World Championships
Gold medal – first place	1991 Tokyo	400 m hurdles
Silver medal – second place	1993 Stuttgart	400 m hurdles
Silver medal – second place	1995 Gothenburg	400 m hurdles
African Championships
Gold medal – first place	1998 Dakar	400 m hurdles

Samuel Matete (born 27 July 1968) is a retired track and field athlete from Zambia, who competed mainly in the 400 metres hurdles.

== Career ==
Noted for his exceptionally fast finish, he was one of the world's leading hurdlers in the early to mid-1990s, and became the first Zambian track and field world champion in 1991. This was the first time that an African athlete had won that event. He represented Zambia in the 400 m hurdles on four occasions (1988 to 2000) and was the silver medallist at the 1996 Atlanta Olympics.

His personal best of 47.10 seconds, achieved during the Weltklasse Zürich in 1991, is the current African record and ranks ninth on the all-time list.

== Competition record ==
Year	Competition	Venue	Position	Event	Notes
Representing Zambia
1988	World Junior Championships	Sudbury, Canada	5th (h)	400 m	46.88
1988	World Junior Championships	Sudbury, Canada	5th	400 m hurdles	51.70
1988	Olympic Games	Seoul, South Korea	26th (h)	400 m hurdles	51.06
1990	Commonwealth Games	Auckland, New Zealand	5th	400 m hurdles	50.34
1991	World Championships	Tokyo, Japan	1st	400 m hurdles	47.64
1992	Olympic Games	Barcelona, Spain	24th (h)	400 m hurdles	49.89
1992	World Cup	Havana, Cuba	1st	400 m hurdles	48.88
1992	World Cup	Havana, Cuba	1st	4 × 400 m relay	3:02.14
1993	Universiade	Buffalo, United States	4th	400 m hurdles	50.31
1993	World Championships	Stuttgart, Germany	2nd	400 m hurdles	47.60
1994	Commonwealth Games	Victoria, Canada	1st	400 m hurdles	48.67
1994	Goodwill Games	St. Petersburg, Russia	2nd	400 m hurdles	47.98
1994	World Cup	London, United Kingdom	1st	400 m hurdles	48.77
1994	World Cup	London, United Kingdom	1st	4 × 400 m relay	3:02.66
1995	World Championships	Gothenburg, Sweden	2nd	400 m hurdles	48.03
1996	Olympic Games	Atlanta, United States	2nd	400 m hurdles	47.78
1997	World Championships	Athens, Greece	5th	400 m hurdles	48.11
1998	Goodwill Games	Uniondale, United States	7th	400 m hurdles	48.96
1998	African Championships	Dakar, Senegal	1st	400 m hurdles	48.58
1998	World Cup	Johannesburg, South Africa	1st	400 m hurdles	48.08
1999	World Championships	Seville, Spain	12th (sf)	400 m hurdles	49.28
2000	Olympic Games	Sydney, Australia	10th (sf)	400 m hurdles	48.98

=== Personal bests ===
- 400 metres hurdles - 47.10 seconds (1991)
- 400 metres - 44.88 seconds (1991)
- 200 metres - 21.04 seconds (1989)
- 100 metres - 10.77 seconds (1989)

Sporting positions
Preceded by Danny Harris	Men's 400 m Hurdles Best Year Performance; 1991	Succeeded by Kevin Young
Olympic Games
Preceded by Davis Mwale	Flagbearer for Zambia; Sydney 2000	Succeeded by Davis Mwale
