= Jiří Mužík =

Czech hurdler

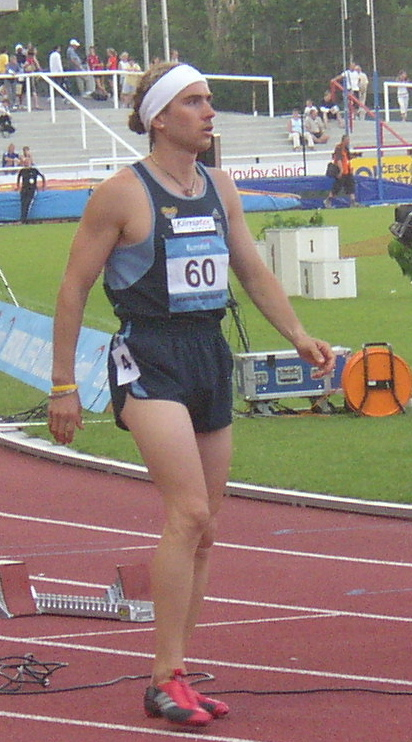
- Jiří Mužík at 2005 Odložil Memorial in Prague

Personal information
- Born: 1 September 1976 (age 50) Plzeň, Czechoslovakia

Sport
- Sport: Track and field
Medal record
Representing Czech Republic
European Championships
Silver medal – second place	2002 Munich	400 m hurdles
European Indoor Championships
Gold medal – first place	2000 Ghent	4x400 m relay

Jiří Mužík (Czech pronunciation: [ˈjɪr̝iː ˈmuʒiːk]) (born 1 September 1976) is a Czech hurdler.

His personal best time was 48.27 seconds, achieved during the heats of the 1997 World Championships in Athens.

== Achievements ==
Year	Competition	Venue	Position	Event	Notes
Representing the Czech Republic
1997	European U23 Championships	Turku, Finland	4th	400 m hurdles	50.18
1997	European U23 Championships	Turku, Finland	2nd	4 × 400 m relay	3:04.13
1997	World Championships	Athens, Greece	8th	400 m hrd	49.51
1997	Universiade	Catania, Italy	4th	400 m hrd	49.63
1998	European Championships	Budapest, Hungary	7th	400 m hrd	50.51
2000	European Indoor Championships	Ghent, Belgium	1st	4 × 400 m relay	3:06.10
2001	World Championships	Edmonton, Canada	7th	400 m hrd	49.07
2002	European Indoor Championships	Vienna, Austria	5th	400 m	46.36
2002	European Championships	Munich, Germany	2nd	400 m hrd	48.43
2002	World Cup	Madrid, Spain	4th	400 m hrd	49.28
