= Vadim Zadoinov =

Moldovan hurdler

Personal information
- Born: 24 May 1969 (age 57) Chişinău, Soviet Union

Sport
- Sport: Track and field

Vadim Zadoynov (Russian: Вадим Задойнов, born 24 May 1969) is a Moldovan athlete who specialized in the 400 metres hurdles.

Zadoynov was born in Chişinău. He won the bronze medal for the Soviet Union at the 1988 World Junior Championships. At the 1990 European Championships he finished fourth in the 400 m hurdles and eighth in the 4 × 400 m relay. At the 1992 Olympic Games he was knocked out in the heats.

Zadoynov also competed at the World Championships in 1993, 1995, 1997 and 1999, and only reached the semi-final once; in 1997. He was also knocked out in the heats at the Olympic Games in 1996 and 2000. He finished seventh at the 1994 European Championships and fifth at the 1998 European Championships.

Zadoynov's personal best time was 48.61 seconds, achieved at the 1990 European Championships in Split.

== International competitions ==
Year	Competition	Venue	Position	Event	Notes
Representing Soviet Union
1987	European Junior Championships	Birmingham, United Kingdom	3rd	4 × 400 m relay	3:09.55
1988	World Junior Championships	Sudbury, Canada	3rd	400 m hurdles	50.88
1990	Goodwill Games	Seattle, United States	7th	400 m hurdles	50.48
1990	European Championships	Split, Yugoslavia	4th	400 m hurdles	48.61 (NR)
1990	European Championships	Split, Yugoslavia	8th	4 x 400 m relay	3:04.17
Representing Unified Team
1992	Olympic Games	Barcelona, Spain	34th (h)	400 m hurdles	51.21
Representing Moldova
1993	World Championships	Stuttgart, Germany	27th (h)	400 m hurdles	50.24
1994	Goodwill Games	Saint Petersburg, Russia	5th	400 m hurdles	49.83
1994	European Championships	Helsinki, Finland	7th	400 m hurdles	49.50 (49.30 semis)
1995	World Championships	Gothenburg, Sweden	28th (h)	400 m hurdles	50.24
1996	European Indoor Championships	Stockholm, Sweden	5th (h)	400 m	47.09 (NR)
1996	Olympic Games	Atlanta, United States	28th (h)	400 m hurdles	49.73
1997	World Indoor Championships	Paris, France	25th (h)	400 m	48.18
1997	World Championships	Athens, Greece	21st (sf)	400 m hurdles	50.07 (49.49 heats)
1998	European Championships	Budapest, Hungary	5th	400 m hurdles	49.10
1999	World Championships	Seville, Spain	32nd (h)	400 m hurdles	50.14
2000	Olympic Games	Sydney, Australia	39th (h)	400 m hurdles	51.08
(#) Indicates overall position in qualifying heats (h) or semifinals (sf)
