= Paolo Bellino =

Italian male retired hurdler

Personal information
- Nationality: Italian
- Born: 19 August 1969 (age 57) Rivoli, Italy
- Height: 1.84 m (6 ft 1/2 in)
- Weight: 79 kg (174 lb)

Sport
- Country: Italy
- Sport: Athletics
- Event: 400 metres hurdles

Achievements and titles
- Personal best: 400 m hs: 49.39 (1991)

Paolo Bellino (born 19 August 1969) is an Italian male retired hurdler who participated at the 1991 World Championships in Athletics.

== Achievements ==
Year	Competition	Venue	Position	Event	Performance	Notes
1991	World Championships	(Japan) Tokyo	Quarter	400 m hs	50.74	
