= Gary Cadogan =

British

Personal information
- Nationality: British (English)
- Born: 8 October 1966 (age 59) London, England
- Height: 6"2

Sport
- Sport: Athletics
- Event: 400 metres hurdles
- Club: Haringey Athletic Club

Gary Anthony Cadogan (born 8 October 1966), is a male former athlete who competed for England at 400m hurdles.

== Biography ==
Cadogan became a double British 400 metres hurdles champion after winning the British AAA Championships title at the 1993 AAA Championships and winning the UK Athletics Championships at Crystal Palace the same year.

He represented England in the 400 metres hurdles event, at the 1994 Commonwealth Games in Victoria, Canada.

In 1998, he tested positive for metabolites of a banned substance but was cleared by UK Athletics of all charges. However, in 2000 the IAAA found him guilty of using the banned anabolic steroid nandrolone, and he received a two-year ban.
