= Stéphane Diagana =

French athlete (born 1969)

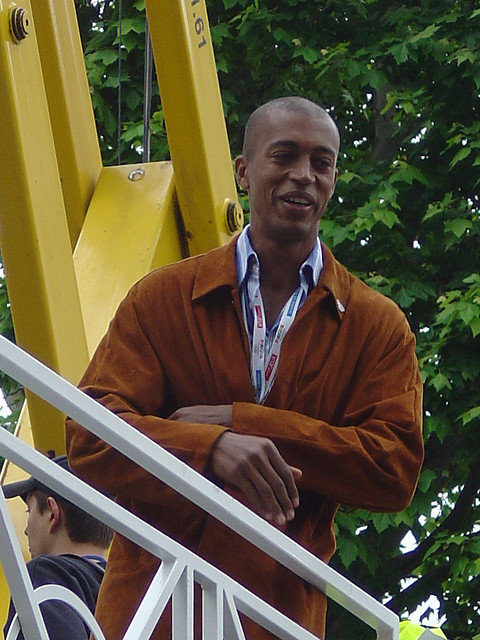

Medal record

Representing France

Men's athletics

World Championships
Gold medal – first place	1997 Athens	400 m hurdles
Gold medal – first place	2003 Paris	4 × 400 m relay
Silver medal – second place	1999 Seville	400 m hurdles
Bronze medal – third place	1995 Gothenburg	400 m hurdles

European Championships
Gold medal – first place	2002 Munich	400 m hurdles
Silver medal – second place	1994 Helsinki	4 × 400 m relay
Bronze medal – third place	1994 Helsinki	400 m hurdles

European Indoor Championships
Silver medal – second place	2002 Vienna	4 × 400 m relay

Stéphane Diagana (born 23 July 1969 in Saint-Affrique, Aveyron) is a retired, French track and field sprinter and hurdler. His specialities were the 400 metres hurdles and the 4 × 400 metres relay.

Diagana won the 400 metres hurdles gold medal at the 1997 World Championships in Athens and the 4 × 400 metres relay gold medal at the 2003 World Championships in Paris. In 2002 he won the 400 metres hurdles gold medal at the European Championships in Munich. Diagana also set a new, European 400 metres hurdles outdoor record of 47.37 sec. in Lausanne, Switzerland on 5 July 1995. This record stood until June 2019.

In his only Olympic appearance, Diagana finished in fourth position in the final of the 400 metres hurdles of the 1992 Olympics in Barcelona. In that Olympics, his 4 × 400 metres relay team was eliminated in the heats.

Diagana retired from competition in 2004 and became a television commentator and advisor to the Fédération française d'athlétisme (French Athletics Federation).

On 7 April 2008, Diagana was an Olympic torch runner for the 2008 Olympics. While he was running with the torch in Paris, Paris city councillor Sylvain Garel tried to snatch it from his hands.

On 21 January 2011, Diagana was seriously injured in road accident while he was cycling along a road of the Col de Vence in the department of Alpes-Maritimes in southeast France. He was airlifted by helicopter to a hospital in Nice. He suffered head injuries and although in a serious condition, he did not lose consciousness.

He is married to Odile Lesage, with whom he has three children.

Records
Preceded by (West Germany) Harald Schmid	Men's 400 m Hurdles European Record Holder; 5 July 1995 – 13 June 2019	Succeeded by (Norway) Karsten Warholm
Sporting positions
Preceded by (United States) Derrick Adkins	Men's 400 m Hurdles Best Year Performance; 1995	Succeeded by (United States) Derrick Adkins
