= Ryan Hayden =

American hurdler (born 1971)

Personal information
- Born: March 13, 1971 (age 55) Indianapolis, Indiana, United States

Sport
- Sport: Track and field
Medal record
Representing United States
Summer Universiade
Gold medal – first place	1995 Fukuoka	4x400m relay

Ryan Hayden (born March 13, 1971) is an American retired hurdler. He represented the US at the 1995 World Championships.
