= Mustapha Sdad =

Moroccan hurdler

Personal information
- Nationality: Moroccan
- Born: 11 April 1970 (age 56) Rabat, Morocco

Sport
- Sport: Track and field
- Event: 400 metres hurdles

Mustapha Sdad (born 11 April 1970) is a Moroccan hurdler. He competed in the men's 400 metres hurdles at the 2000 Summer Olympics.
