= Mugur Mateescu =

Romanian hurdler

Personal information
- Nationality: Romanian
- Born: 13 June 1969 (age 57)
- Spouse: Rodica Mateescu

Sport
- Sport: Track and field
- Event: 400 metres hurdles

Mugur Mircea Mateescu (born 13 June 1969) is a Romanian hurdler. He competed in the men's 400 metres hurdles at the 1996 Summer Olympics.
