= Salvador Vila =

Spanish hurdler

Personal information
- Nationality: Spanish
- Born: 20 October 1969 (age 56) Valencia
- Height: 184 cm (6 ft 0 in)
- Weight: 73 kg (161 lb)

Sport
- Country: Spain
- Sport: Hurdling

Salvador Vila is a Spanish Olympic hurdler. He represented his country in the men's 400 metres hurdles at the 1996 Summer Olympics. His time was a 50.55 in the hurdles.
