= Egīls Tēbelis =

Latvian hurdler

Personal information
- Nationality: Latvian
- Born: 12 December 1972 (age 53) Saldus, Latvian SSR, Soviet Union
- Height: 195 cm (6 ft 5 in)
- Weight: 81 kg (179 lb)

Sport
- Sport: Track and field
- Event: 400 metres hurdles

Egīls Tēbelis (born 12 December 1972) is a Latvian hurdler. He competed in the men's 400 metres hurdles at the 1996 Summer Olympics.
