= Carlos Silva (hurdler) =

Portuguese hurdler

Personal information
- Born: 8 June 1974 (age 52) Lisbon, Portugal

Sport
- Sport: Track and field

Carlos Alberto da Silva (born 8 June 1974) is a Portuguese retired athlete who specialized in the 400 metres hurdles.

He finished fourth at the 1998 European Championships. He also competed at the 1994 European Championships in Athletics, the 1995 World Championships, the 1996 Olympic Games, the 1999 World Championships and the 2002 European Championships without reaching the final. His personal best time was 48.77 seconds, achieved in August 1999 in Zurich.

During the indoor season, he competed in the 400-metre sprint. He finished fifth at the 1995 World Indoor Championships and at the 1998 European Indoor Championships. His personal best time was 46.11 seconds, achieved in May 1996 in Lisbon.
