= Curt Young (athlete) =

Panamanian hurdler

Curt Young (born 18 January 1974) is a former Panamanian hurdler who competed in the 1996 Summer Olympics and the 2000 Summer Olympics. In 1996, he failed to advance from the first round with a score of 55.20. In 2000, he bettered his first round time to 52.46, but still it wasn't enough to advance.

Young competed for the Texas A&M Aggies track and field team in the NCAA.
