= Óscar Pitillas =

Spanish hurdler

Personal information
- Nationality: Spanish
- Born: 16 October 1971 (age 54) Valencia, Spain

Sport
- Sport: Track and field
- Event: 400 metres hurdles

Óscar Miguel Pitillas Torra (born 16 October 1971) is a Spanish hurdler. He competed in the men's 400 metres hurdles at the 1996 Summer Olympics.
