= Gary Jennings (athlete) =

British hurdler (born 1972)

Personal information
- Nationality: British (English)
- Born: 21 February 1972 (age 54) Portsmouth, England
- Height: 187 cm (6 ft 2 in)
- Weight: 87 kg (192 lb)

Sport
- Sport: Athletics
- Event: 400 metres hurdles
- Club: Newham and Essex Beagles
Medal record
Representing Great Britain
Summer Universiade
| Bronze medal – third place | 1995 Fukuoka | 4x400m relay |

Gary Jennings (born 21 February 1972) is a male British former hurdler who competed at the 1996 Summer Olympics.

== Biography ==
At the 1996 Olympic Games in Atlanta, he represented Great Britain in the men's 400 metres hurdles event.

He represented England in the 400 metres hurdles event, at the 1998 Commonwealth Games in Kuala Lumpur, Malaysia.

Jennings was on the podium on three occasions at the AAA Championships in 1995, 1996 and 1997.
