= Jean-Paul Bruwier =

Belgian hurdler

Personal information
- Nationality: Belgian
- Born: 18 February 1971 (age 55) Liège, Belgium

Sport
- Sport: Track and field
- Event: 400 metres hurdles

Jean-Paul Bruwier (born 18 February 1971) is a Belgian hurdler. He competed in the men's 400 metres hurdles at the 1996 Summer Olympics.

Bruwier was an All-American hurdler for the USC Trojans track and field team, finishing 3rd in the 400 meters hurdles at the 1994 NCAA Division I Outdoor Track and Field Championships.
