= Iñigo Monreal =

Spanish athletics competitor

Personal information
- Born: 26 September 1974 (age 52) Pamplona, Navarre, Spain

Sport
- Sport: Track and field

Iñigo Monreal Saénz (Note: In this Spanish name, the first or paternal surname is Monreal and the second or maternal family name is Saénz.) (born 26 September 1974) is a retired track and field athlete from Spain, who represented his native country at two consecutive Summer Olympics, starting in 1996. He competed in the 400m hurdles and in the 4x400m relay.

In the 2008 Spanish General Election, he was a candidate for the Congress of Deputies with Nafarroa Bai.
