= Bud Winter =

American college cross country and track & field coach

Biographical details
- Born: June 8, 1909; San Francisco, California, U.S.
- Died: December 6, 1985 (aged 76); Houston, Texas, U.S.

Coaching career (HC unless noted)
- 1941-1970: San Jose State

Accomplishments and honors

Championships
- NCAA Division I men's cross country championships (1962, 1963); NCAA Division I Men's Outdoor Track and Field Championships (1969)

Lloyd C. Winter, better known as Bud Winter (June 8, 1909 – December 6, 1985) was an American track and field coach who is regarded as one of the greatest sprint coaches in the world. Over a 29-year coaching career (1941–1970) for the San Jose State Spartans, he produced 102 All-Americans, 27 who went on to become Olympians.

Included in the list of successes were Olympic gold medalists Lee Evans, Tommie Smith and Ronnie Ray Smith. All the aforementioned also became World Record Holders, Evans' 1968 record in the 400 meters lasted almost 20 years—the first man to break 44 seconds, Smith's World Record in the 200 meters lasted over a decade—the first man to officially break 20 seconds. Winter also coached John Carlos, who can also lay claim to being the first man to break 20 seconds in the 200 meters (though his record was disallowed because of the "brush" type of spikes he used) and Christos Papanikolaou of Greece, who was the first man to clear 18 feet in the pole vault. As a team, San Jose State won the 1969 National Collegiate Athletic Association (NCAA) Division I Track Championships; his teams placed in the top 10 14 times. San Jose State also won two NCAA Men's Division I Cross Country Championships in 1962 and 1963 and were runners-up in 1961. Winter served as an assistant coach for the U.S. team at the 1964 Olympic Games in Tokyo.

== Early success ==
Video on YouTube SJSU Speed City

Before joining SJSC, Winter coached Harold Davis at Hartnell College in Salinas, California to tying the world record in the 100 metres. Davis never had the opportunity to compete in the Olympics, his peak years falling during World War II. During the war, Winter taught relaxation techniques to Naval pilots. Also during that time, Winter invented a life jacket that would automatically inflate if it came in contact with water. It was those same relaxation techniques taught to sprinters that "allowed the speed to come out."

After being hired to coach San Jose State's track and field team, Winter's first success was Willie Steele, who went on to win the 1948 Olympic gold medal in the long jump. Winter's next success was with Ray Norton, previously from Oakland City College, bringing him to be the No. 1 sprinter in the world and tying the world record in the 100 metres. California State Junior College sprint champion Bob “The Bullet” Poynter (later coach to Millard Hampton and Andre Phillips at Silver Creek High School) to give SJSC the top two sprinters in the world. Over the course of his tenure, he earned the team the nickname "Speed City"

Also working with Winter as an assistant coach was Bert Bonanno, who went on to coach across town at San Jose City College. Bonanno later coached many of the athletes involved the 1970s resurgence of San Jose as a Track and Field hotbed, including Olympic medalists Hampton, Phillips, John Powell and Bruce Jenner (later to be known as Caitlyn Jenner). (Note: Jenner changed her name due to gender transition in 2015.)

== Legacy ==
The track stadium at San Jose State University was named Bud Winter Field it was one of the first tartan tracks in the world. The track and field program was canceled in 1988 after a series of budget cuts and Title IX related decisions decimated the program. In August 2016, San Jose State University announced the reinstatement of men's track and field, with the official program restart date of October 16, 2018 on the 50th anniversary of Tommie Smith and John Carlos' demonstration on the Olympic Games podium

After canceling the track and field program, the Bud Winter Field then fell into disrepair, until it was demolished in 2019. The site was then remodeled for the construction of a multi-purpose recreation field and a parking structure for the neighboring CEFCU Stadium and Sharks Ice arena During development, a replacement track on the parking garage's rooftop was considered but abandoned due to its projected cost. A tribute to the Speed City is planned for the site. In 2022, the university began raising funds to build a $25 million Speed City Legacy Center, including a replacement track, at the Santa Clara County Fairgrounds nearby.

== Author ==
Winter authored the book "So You Want to be a Sprinter," still one of the leading works on the subject of sprinting. There is also a video by the same name "So You Want to be a Sprinter". He wrote four books in total:

1. So You Want to be a Sprinter (1956, 1973) with Jimson Lee
2. The Rocket Sprint Start (1964) with Jimson Lee
3. Jet Sprint Relay Pass (June 1, 1964, Tafnews Press, ISBN 978-9994556281)
4. Relax and Win: Championship Performance in Whatever You Do (December 1, 1981, Oak Tree Publications, ISBN 978-0498025419).

== Death ==
Winter died on December 6, 1985 of a heart attack in Houston at the age of 76 after playing a game of Racquetball with Bert Bonanno, one day before his induction into the National Track and Field Hall of Fame. In 2010 he was inducted into the African-American Ethnic Sports Hall of Fame.

== Athletes coached by Winter ==
- John Carlos 1 Olympic medal, world record 200 meters
- Harold Davis world record 100 meters
- Lee Evans 2 Olympic Gold medals, world record 400 meters
- Jeff Fishback
- Dennis Johnson, brought sprint technique coaching to Jamaica
- George Mattos
- Lloyd Murad
- Ray Norton = world record 100-yard dash, = world record 100 meters
- Jimmy Omagbemi
- Christos Papanikolaou world record holder pole vault, first man over 18'
- Bobby Poynter
- Ronnie Ray Smith 1 Olympic Gold medal, = world record 100 meters
- Tommie Smith 1 Olympic Gold medal, world record 200 meters
- Dick Smothers
- Willie Steele 1 Olympic Gold medal
- Willie Williams world record 100 meters
