= Pointer =

Pointer may refer to:

== People with the name ==
- Pointer (surname), a surname (including a list of people with the name)
- Pointer Williams (born 1974), American former basketball player

== Arts, entertainment, and media ==
- Pointer (journal), the official journal of the Singapore Armed Forces
- The Pointer, a 1939 American animated short film
- The Pointer Sisters, an American R&B vocal group formed in 1969

== Astronomy ==
Pairs of stars known as the Pointers:

- Alpha and Beta Centauri, which point to the Southern Cross
- Alpha and Beta Ursae Majoris, which point to Polaris

== Brands and enterprises ==
- Pointer (wireless phone), a short-lived mobile phone service in Finland in the 1980s
- Pointer Insecticide, a brand of injected Imidacloprid for systemic insect control in trees
- Pointer Telocation, an Israeli company specializing in stolen vehicle recovery

== Computing ==
- Pointer (computer programming), a data type
- Pointer (user interface), an on-screen image moving to a mouse or touchpad
- Pointing stick, an isometric joystick on a laptop

== Devices ==
- Pointer (rod), an object used to point manually
- Pointer, a dial indicator, that points to a value on a dial or scale
- Pointer, a kind of pencil sharpener used for 2.0 mm diameter lead
- Pointing stick, an isometric joystick used as a pointing device

== Dog breeds ==
- Pointer (dog breed), the English type
- Pointing breed, a group of breeds of hunting dog trained to point at prey

== Places ==
- Pointer, Kentucky, United States
- Pointers, New Jersey, United States
- The Pointers, rocks off Antarctica

== Vehicles ==
- FQM-151 Pointer, a 1988 model of US military drone
- Plaxton Pointer, a single-decker bus body made 1991–2006
- Volkswagen Pointer, a 1990s family car sold in South America

== Other uses ==
- Point man, one who takes the front position in a combat military formation
- Index finger, a slang term for a pointer

== See also ==
- Point (disambiguation)
- Pointing (disambiguation)
- Poynter (disambiguation)
- Poynting (disambiguation)
