= List of high schools producing multiple Olympic gold medalists =

An Olympic gold medal is widely regarded as one of the highest achievements in a sport. Many high schools and secondary schools highlight alumni who has competed to the Olympics, though few high schools have produced multiple Olympic gold medalists.

Notes: T = team gold medalist; WR = also hold the current world record

St. Patrick's High School (Iten, Kenya) Matthew Birir -Olympic Gold medalist and World Junior Champion Michael Boit - Olympic Bronze medalist, former Sports Commissioner of Kenya and currently a professor of sports science at Kenyatta University Wilson Boit Kipketer -World record holder 3000 metres steeplechase, World Champion, Olympic medalist Wilson Kipketer - 4 World Championships, 2 Olympic medals, multiple world records at 800 metres and 1000 metres. Peter Rono - Olympic Gold medalist

- Bedford School (Bedford, Bedfordshire, England): Harold Abrahams 1924, Jack Beresford 1924, 1932, 1936, Edward Vaughan Bevan 1928, Sven Meinhardt 1992, Stefan Tewes 1992, Phelan Hill 2016
- Eton College (Berkshire, England): Guy Nickalls 1908, Ewart Horsfall 1912, Lord Burghley 1928, Robin Dixon 1964, Matthew Pinsent 1992–2004, Andrew Lindsay 2000, Ed Coode 2004, Constantine Louoloudis 2016
- Jefferson High School (Los Angeles, California): Mal Whitfield 1948, Charles Dumas 1956
- John Muir High School (Pasadena, California): Alice Brown 1984 T, Inger Miller 1996 T, Linetta Wilson 1996 T
- Jordan High School (Los Angeles, California): Hayes Edward Sanders 1952, Florence Griffith Joyner 1988 & WR, Kevin Young 1992 & WR
- Kirrawee High School (Kirrawee, New South Wales): Saya Sakakibara 2024, Ashlee Ankudinoff 2024.
- East St. Louis Lincoln High School (East St. Louis, Illinois): Al Joyner 1984, Jackie Joyner-Kersee 1988 & WR, 1992; brother and sister
- Mercersburg Academy (Mercersburg, Pennsylvania): Robert Leavitt 1906, James Edwin "Ted" Meredith 1912, Allen Woodring 1918, Harrison Smith "Harry" Glancy 1924 T, William Carr 1932, Charles Moore 1952, Richard Erwin "Rich" Saeger 1984 T, Faith Elizabeth "Betsy" Mitchell 1984 T, Melvin "Mel" Stewart 1992
- Mount Albert Grammar School (Auckland, New Zealand): Peter Snell (runner) 1960, 1964, Shane O'Brien (rower) 1984 T
- North Salinas High School (Salinas, California): Calvin Harrison 2000 T (team later disqualified), Alvin Harrison 1996 T, 2000 T (team later disqualified); identical twin brothers
- Oakland Catholic High School (Pittsburgh, Pennsylvania): Amanda Polk (rower) 2016, Leah Smith (swimmer) 2016
- Palo Alto High School (Palo Alto, California): Morris Kirksey (rugby union) 1920, Dink Templeton (rugby union) 1920, Mark Schultz (wrestling) 1984, Dave Schultz (wrestling) 1984 (brothers)
- President William McKinley High School (Honolulu, Hawaii): Duke Kahanamoku 1912, 1920, Ford Konno 1952
- Punahou School (Honolulu, Hawaii): Warren Kealoha 1920, 1924, Mariechen Jackson 1924, Buster Crabbe 1932, Carissa Moore 2020 in 2021
- St. Patrick's High School (Kenya): Peter Rono 1988, Matthew Birir 1992, David Rudisha 2012. Note: Between Wilson Kipketer and David Rudisha the school has also held the world record for 800 metres since August 13, 1997.
- Samuel F. B. Morse High School (San Diego, California): Arnie Robinson 1976, Monique Henderson 2004 T, 2008 T
- San Gorgonio High School and John F. Kennedy High School (Los Angeles, California): Sherri Howard and Denean Howard, sisters who both won a gold medal on the same 1984 4x400 relay team (Denean ran in the preliminary round). The sisters transferred to Kennedy in 1981 after setting the NFHS National High School Record in the 4x440y relay at San Gorgonio with two other sisters (Howard, Howard, Howard, Howard).
- Santa Clara High School (Santa Clara, California): Donna de Varona 1964, Don Schollander 1964, 1968 T, Claudia Kolb 1968, Mark Spitz 1968 T, 1972, Joe Bottom 1976 T, Brian Boitano 1988, Heather Simmons-Carrasco 1996 T
- Silver Creek High School (San Jose, California): Millard Hampton 1976 T, Andre Phillips 1988
- Stratton Mountain School (Stratton, Vermont): Ross Powers 2002, Kristin Luckenbill 2004 T, Lindsey Jacobellis 2022
- Tulare Union High School (Tulare, California): Bob Mathias 1948, 1952, Sim Iness 1952
- Newport Harbor High School (Newport Beach, California): Steve Timmons 1984, 1988Misty May-Treanor 2004, 2008, 2012 Aaron Peirsol 2004, 2008Kaleigh Gilchrist 2016, 2020
- Mira Costa High School (Manhattan Beach, California): Eric Fonoimoana 2000, Alix Klineman 2020
- Woodrow Wilson Classical High School (Long Beach, California): Pat McCormick 1952, 1956, Tim Shaw 1976 T, Bob Ctvrtlik 1988 T, Sean Burroughs 2000 T, Jessica Hardy 2012 T, Lashinda Demus 2012 (awarded 2024), Lauren Wenger 2012
