= Robert Poynter =

American retired sprinter (born 1937)

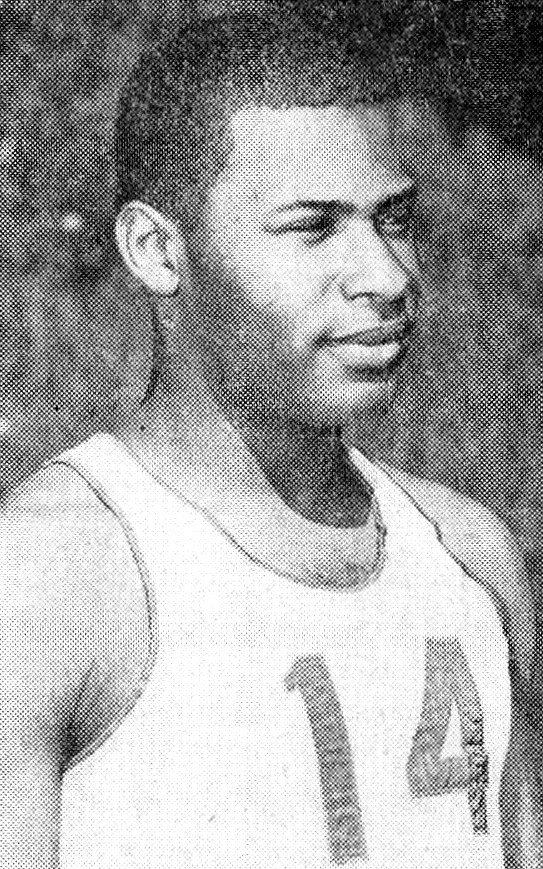
- Poynter, circa 1962

Personal information
- Nationality: American
- Born: December 5, 1937 (age 88)

Sport
- Sport: Sprint running
- College team: San Jose State University
Medal record
Representing the United States
Pan American Games
Gold medal – first place	1959 Chicago	4 × 100 m

Robert Addison "Bobby" Poynter (born December 5, 1937) is an American retired sprinter. He ran collegiately for San Jose State College, where he was coached by Bud Winter. He was the runner up at the 1959 NCAA Championships in the 100 yard dash and 220 yard dash. In the 220, he lost to San Jose State teammate Ray Norton. That same year he won a gold medal at the Pan American Games as a member of the American 4 × 100 meters relay. During that 1959 season he was ranked #3 in the world in both the 100 meters and the 200 meters.

While at Pasadena High School, he won the 220 at the CIF California State Meet in 1955 and 56. His 21.0 in 1956 was the state record. Those same years he placed third and second in the 100, beaten by Ken Dennis in 1955 (later defeating Dennis in the 220). He was the 1956 CIF Southern Section Athlete of the Year. In 1957, running for Pasadena City College, he won the California Community College title in the 220 and 100 runner up.

After getting his master's degree at Cal Poly, he coached at Silver Creek High School and also San Jose City College, taking his protégé Millard Hampton to a 1976 Olympic gold medal and individual silver medal. He had a similar arrangement taking Andre Phillips to eventually achieving a 1988 gold medal. He was also decathlete Bruce Jenner's sprint coach. More recently, he is sprint coach at West Valley College.

After USA failed to put an athlete into the final of the 2012 Olympics 400 meters, Poynter was asked for analysis:

"I believe that we do not provide room for younger 400 runners to develop and just rely on retreads. It takes hard work, discipline, and support from our educational system. Physical education and track has been cutback or eliminated in many schools. If we do not increase and develop runners in our community I can only see the problem getting worse."
