= Ponter =

Ponter is a surname. Notable people with the surname include:

- Danielle Ponter (born 2000), Australian rules footballer
- Daran Ponter (born 1968), New Zealand politician

== See also ==
- Pointer (disambiguation)
- Ponter's Ball Dyke, earthwork in England
- Potter (name)
