= Bert Bonanno =

American track and field coach

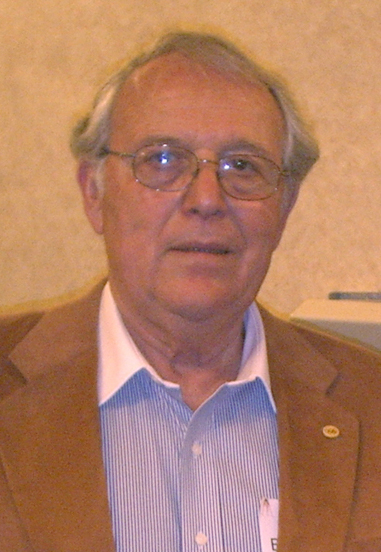
- Bonanno in 2006
- Born: Bert Salvatore Bonanno; Pittsburg, California, US
- Occupations: Track and field coach; sports administrator

Bert Salvatore Bonanno is an American track and field coach and sports administrator who has produced numerous Olympic champions and world-record holders.

== Biography ==
Bonanno began his coaching career in the 1950s at San Jose State College as an assistant to Bud Winter (1909–1985), regarded as one of the greatest sprint coaches in the world. He was playing racquetball with Winter at the TAC Annual Meeting when Winter suffered his fatal heart attack, one day before his induction into the National Track and Field Hall of Fame.

At San Jose State, Bonanno led the freshmen team to two national track and field championships. He also recruited hammer thrower national champion Ed Burke, who went on to compete in three Olympics and was the flag-bearer for the United States at the 1984 Olympic Games.

From 1964 to 1968, Bonanno was the head coach of the Mexican track and field team. He was one of several foreign coaches—including some from the Eastern Bloc—recruited by the Mexican Olympic Committee to help the host team prepare for the 1968 Olympic Games in Mexico City. At the height of the Cold War, and with the Olympic Games so close to the US border, the suspicious Central Intelligence Agency recruited Bonanno to provide information on the coaches they suspected were undercover agents.

Bonanno worked as a liaison between the Mexican officials and 3M in 1968, the year the first artificial track was installed for Olympic competition. "It had been red cinder at the Olympic Games up until then. 3M hired Jesse Owens to assist them to convince the Mexican Olympic Committee to put that track in," Bonanno said.

In 1969, Bonanno became the head coach at San Jose City College (SJCC), where he established a world-class track and field program. At the 1976 Olympic Games in Montreal, he coached decathlete Caitlyn Jenner (Note: Jenner changed her name due to gender transition in 2015.) and sprinter Millard Hampton to gold medals. Other outstanding athletes training at SJCC were Andre Phillips, 1988 Olympic champion in hurdles, as well as throwers Mac Wilkins, Al Feuerbach and John Powell, all Olympians and world record holders.

Bonanno became dean of athletics at SJCC in 1976.

From 1973 to 1996, Bonanno served as director of the Bruce Jenner Classic Track and Field Classic, which grew into one of the top international events. He also co-founded the Mercury News 10K Race and served as meet director for the 1984 and 1987 USA Outdoor Track and Field Championships held at San Jose City College.

He also served as the US coach at the 1981 Pan Pacific Games in Auckland, New Zealand, and the 1989 Indoor World Championships in Athletics in Budapest.

He was the head coach for Peru at the 1972 Olympic Games in Munich, and coached athletes from Hungary, New Zealand and Scotland from the 1970s to 1990s.

After 33 years with the college, Bonanno retired from San Jose City College in 2003.

== Awards ==
In 1980, he was the first recipient of the Bud Winter Sportsman of the Year Award. Bonanno was inducted into the California Community College Track and Field Hall of Fame in 1986 and twenty years later, inducted star pupil Millard Hampton into the hall. He was elected into the San Jose Sports Hall of Fame in 2007. San Jose City College also awards the Bert Bonanno Scholar-Athlete Award each year.

Bonanno, whose paternal and maternal grandparents emigrated from Italy, also received the Italian American Heritage Foundation Achievement Award in 2004.
