= Poynter (disambiguation) =

Poynter is an English surname.

Poynter may also refer to:

- Poynter Institute, an American journalism school
- Poynter Col, Antarctica
- Poynter Hill, Antarctica

== See also ==
- Pointer (disambiguation)
