= Kelly McBride =

American journalist, educator, and ethicist

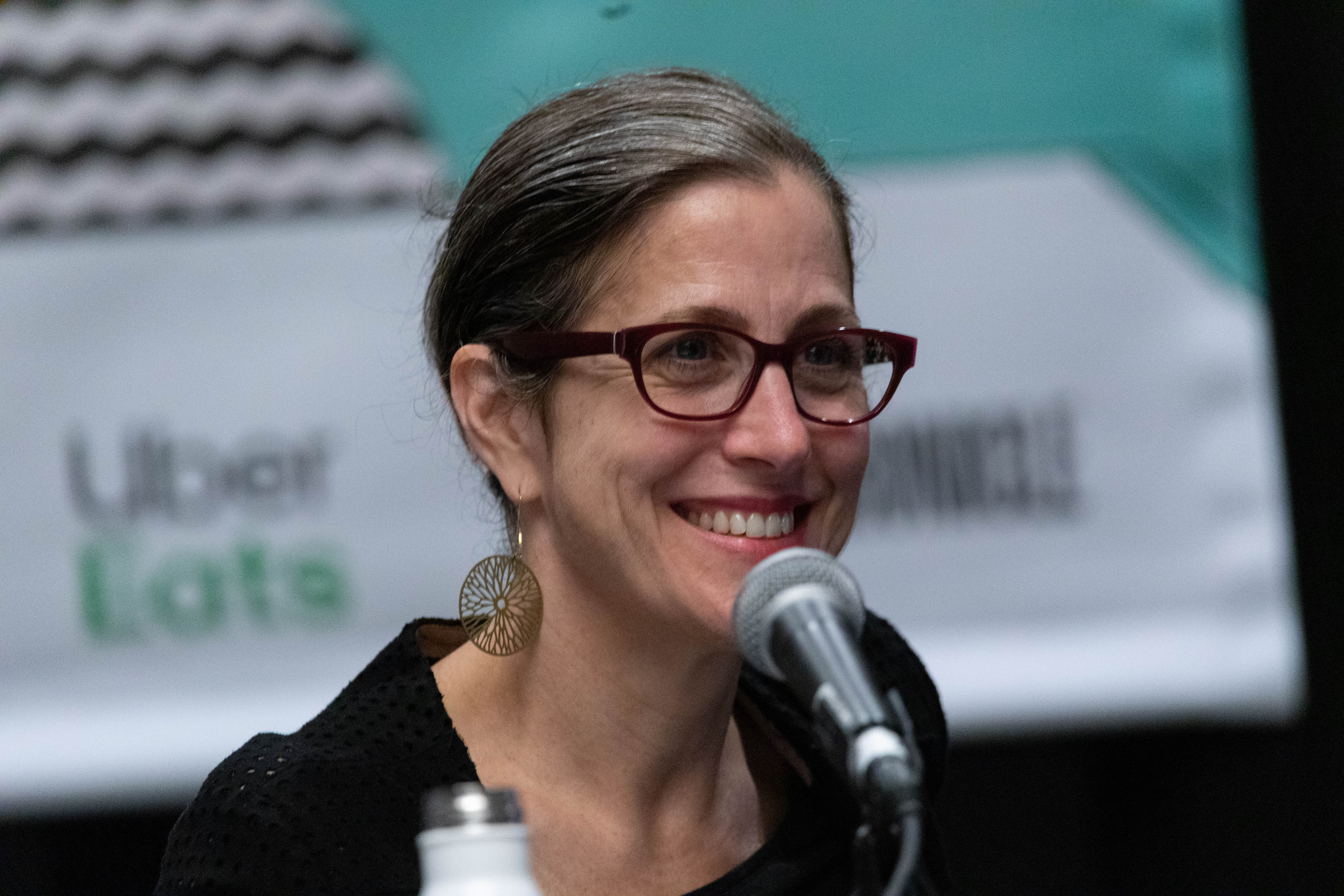
- McBride in 2019
- Born: 1966 (age 59–60)
- Education: University of Missouri (BA); Gonzaga University (MA)
- Occupations: Writer, teacher
- Known for: Media ethics

Kelly B. McBride (born 1966) is an American writer, teacher and commentator on media ethics.

== Personal life ==
Kelly McBride earned a Bachelor of Journalism degree in 1988 from the University of Missouri School of Journalism, and a Master of Arts in religious studies in 2000 from Gonzaga University, Spokane, Washington. She is a mother and is divorced.

== Career ==
McBride worked as a reporter in the Pacific Northwest for 15 years before joining the non-profit Poynter Institute in St. Petersburg, Florida.

Since 2002, she has published "Updates on ethical decision-making in newsrooms big and small" at poynter.org. As vice president of the Academic Programs of Poynter Institute, she also serves on Poynter's board of trustees. At Poynter she has headed the Ethics Department and the Reporting, Writing and Editing Department, and has directed Poynter's Sense-Making Project, an initiative exploring changes in journalism, from "a profession for a few to a civic obligation of many", including the Fifth Estate and effects of technology on democracy.

In April 2020, she became National Public Radio's public editor through a partnership with NPR and Poynter

== Publications ==
=== Books ===
McBride co-edited The New Ethics of Journalism: Principles for the 21st Century, featuring 14 essays and a new code of ethics for journalists.

In March 2014, she authored A Practical Approach to Journalism Ethics for the Bureau of International Information Programs of the United States Department of State.

=== Selected articles ===
News sites including The New York Times, Washington Post, CNN, NPR and the BBC have quoted McBride's advice on journalistic ethics and have published her essays.

- "When It's O.K. to Pay for a Story" (2015)
- "How Should NPR Cover Itself?" (2009)
- "Pubmedia leaders should seek 'creative ways' to explore country's deep divisions" (2009) (commissioned by Editorial Integrity for Public Media: Principles, Policies, Practices)
- "Rethinking rape coverage – Should anonymity be absolute" (2002)
