= Memorial Field (Dartmouth) =

Stadium built in 1923, home to Dartmouth football team

Coordinates: 43°42′04″N 72°17′03″W

Buddy Teevens Stadium at Memorial Field
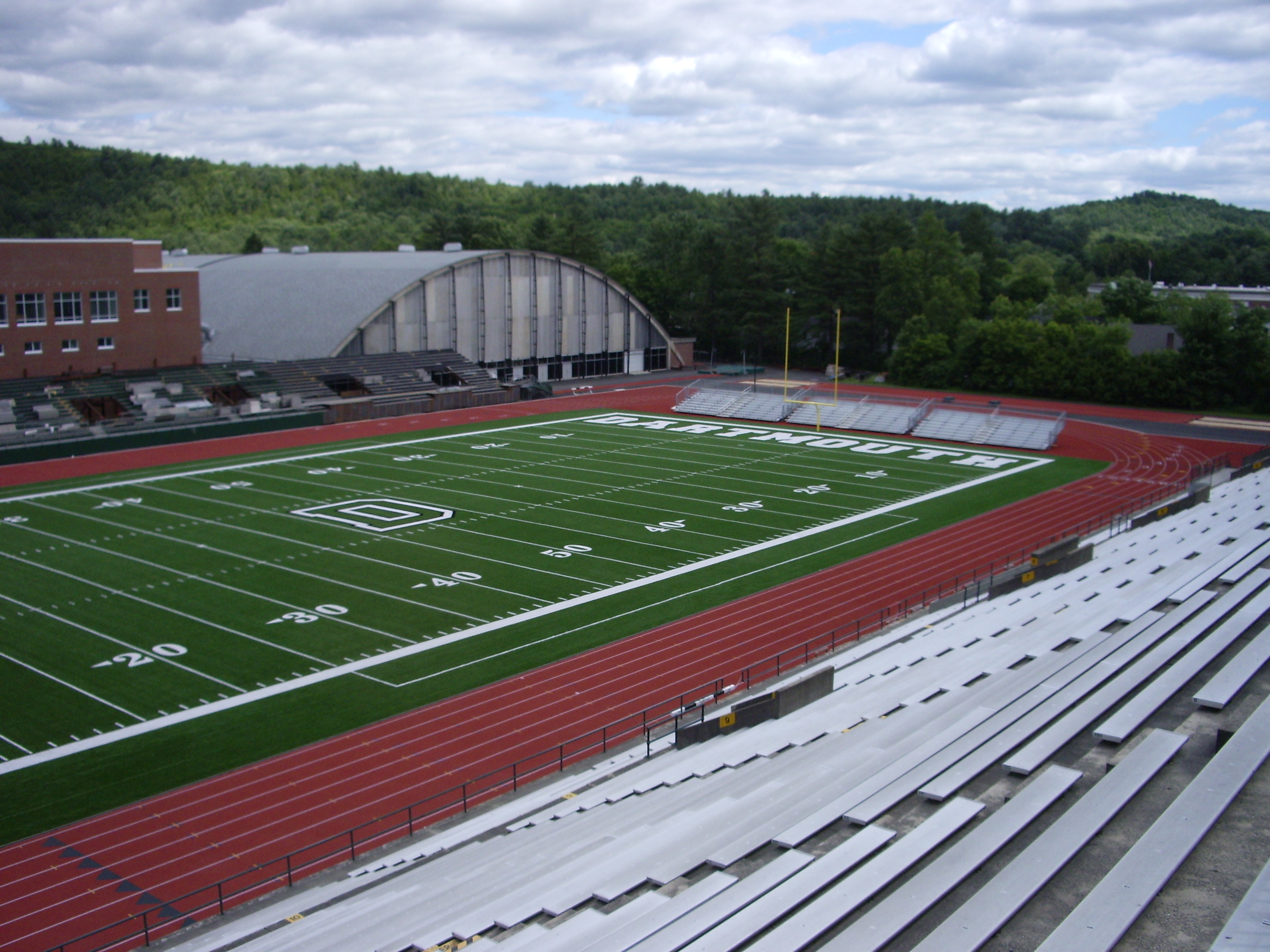
- Interactive map of Buddy Teevens Stadium at Memorial Field
- Former names: Memorial Field (1923–2024)
- Location: 4 Crosby Street; Hanover, NH 03755
- Owner: Dartmouth College
- Operator: Dartmouth College
- Capacity: 11,000
- Surface: Artificial turf (as of Fall 2006)

Construction
- Opened: 1893; 1923

Tenants
- Dartmouth Big Green (football, track and field)

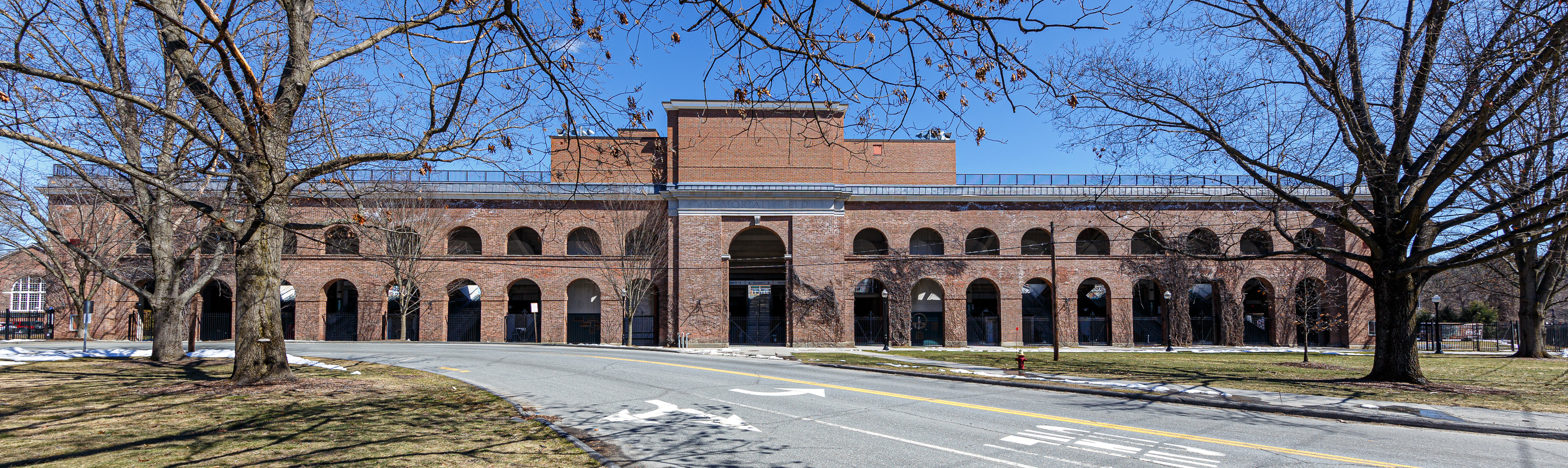
Exterior

Buddy Teevens Stadium at Memorial Field is a football stadium located in Hanover, New Hampshire, United States. It is the home of Dartmouth Big Green football and outdoor track teams. The athletic teams at Dartmouth College compete in the Ivy League. In October 2024, it was dedicated to long-time Dartmouth Football coach Buddy Teevens.

== History ==
In 1893, Dartmouth alumni built a football field called Alumni Oval in the southeastern part of the campus. The field's original wooden grandstand, which backed up on Crosby Street, burned in 1911. In 1923, the college built Memorial Field, with a brick-faced concrete stand and press box on Crosby Street. The stadium opened as a memorial to the students and alumni who had served and died in World War I. Permanent stands on the east side of the field were built later, and end zone bleachers have also been used.

Memorial Field underwent renovation during the summer of 2006, including replacement of the natural grass field with artificial turf to allow nearly year-round use; installation of an 8-lane Tartan track; construction of safety improvements; and the construction of a new varsity athletics center that has reduced the East Stands. With some of the loss made up by stands placed behind the end zones, the current seating capacity is approximately 11,000, down from 22,000 pre-renovation.

The stadium is the end-point of a popular Shriners parade every summer, and is often the venue for the New Hampshire vs. Vermont high school all-star football game which follows the parade.

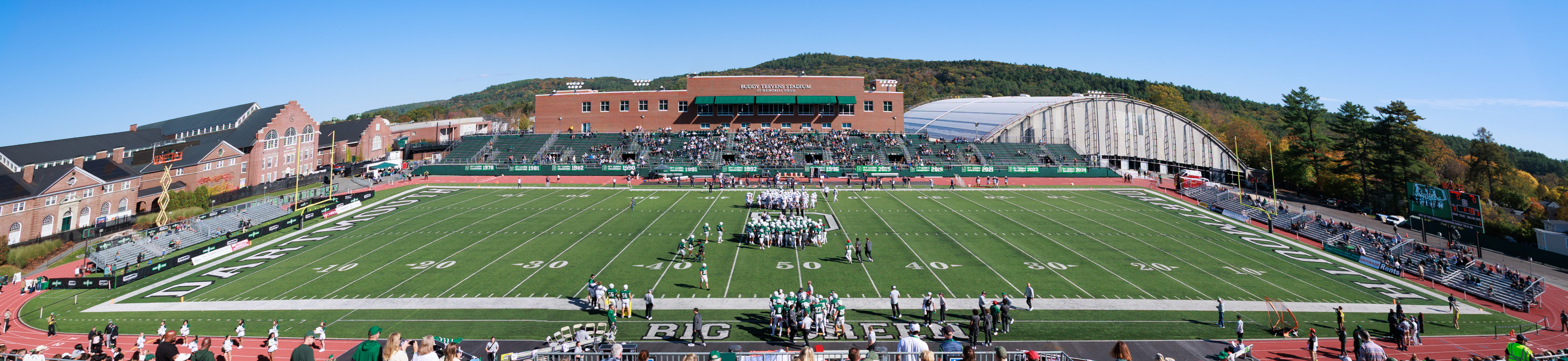
Buddy Teevens Stadium at Memorial Field

== See also ==
- List of NCAA Division I FCS football stadiums
