= Fruitdale, San Jose =

Fruitdale
- Neighborhood of San Jose; Census Designated Place (partially)
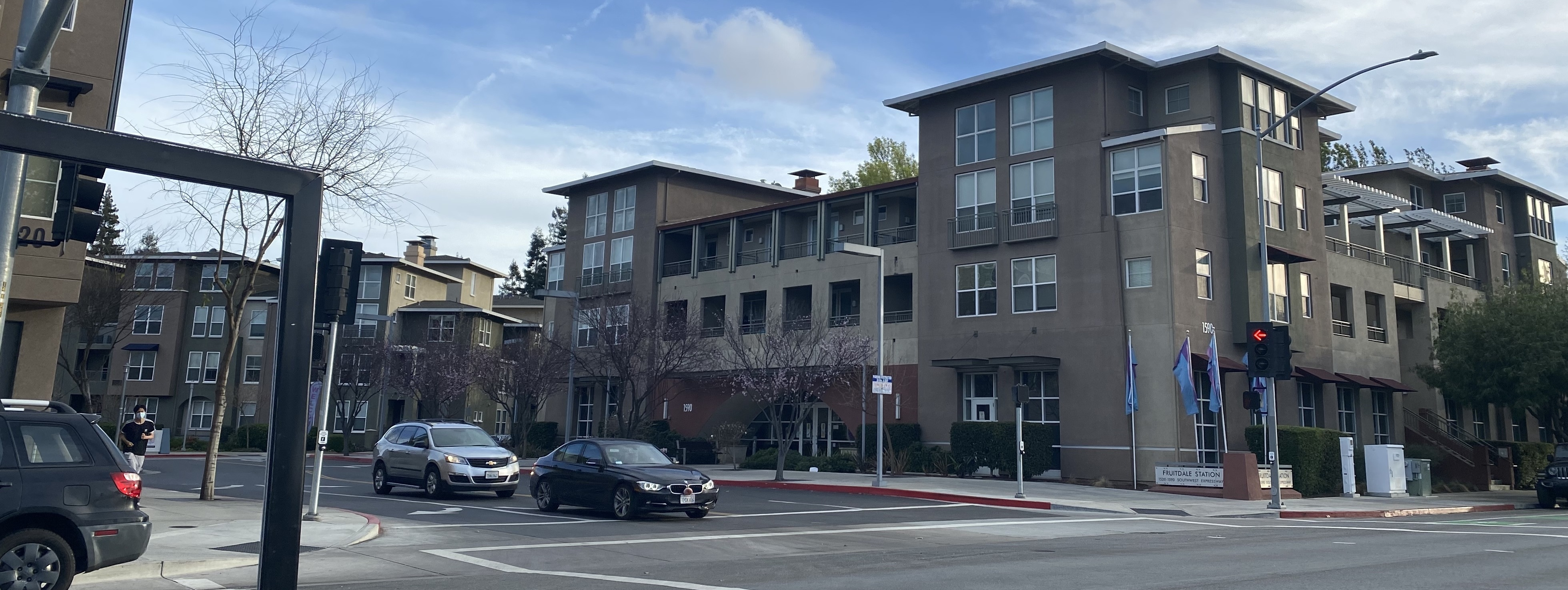
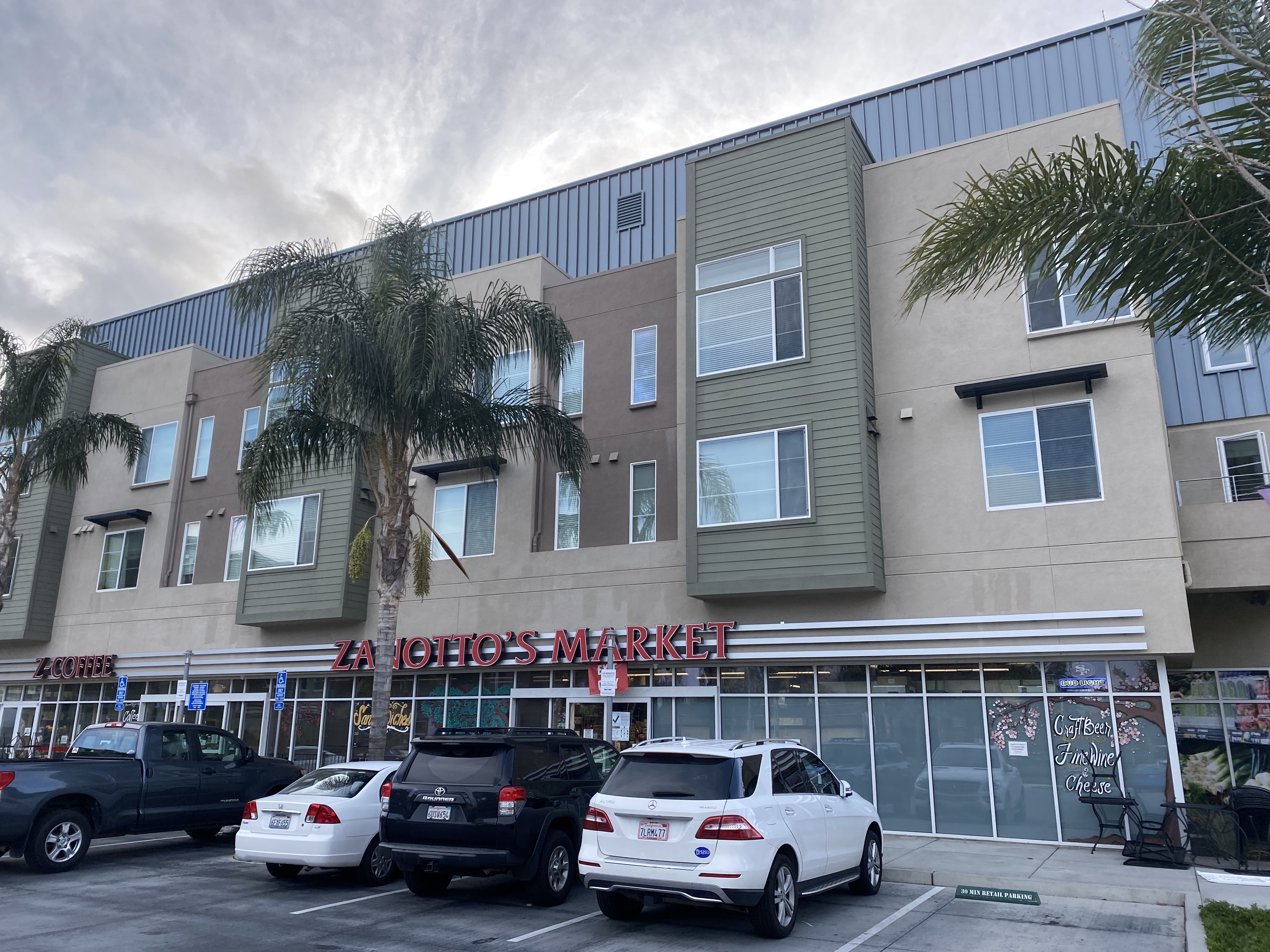
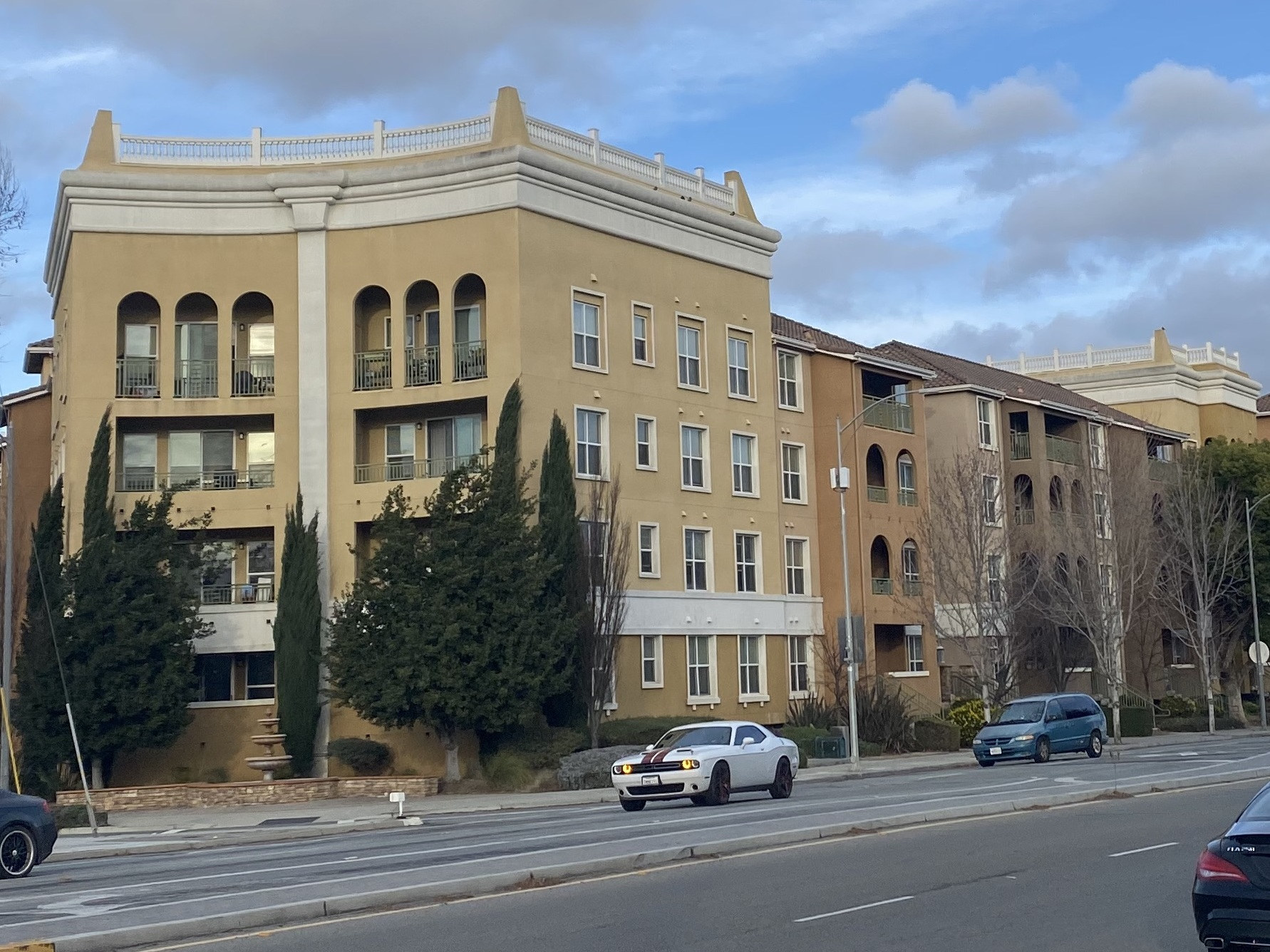
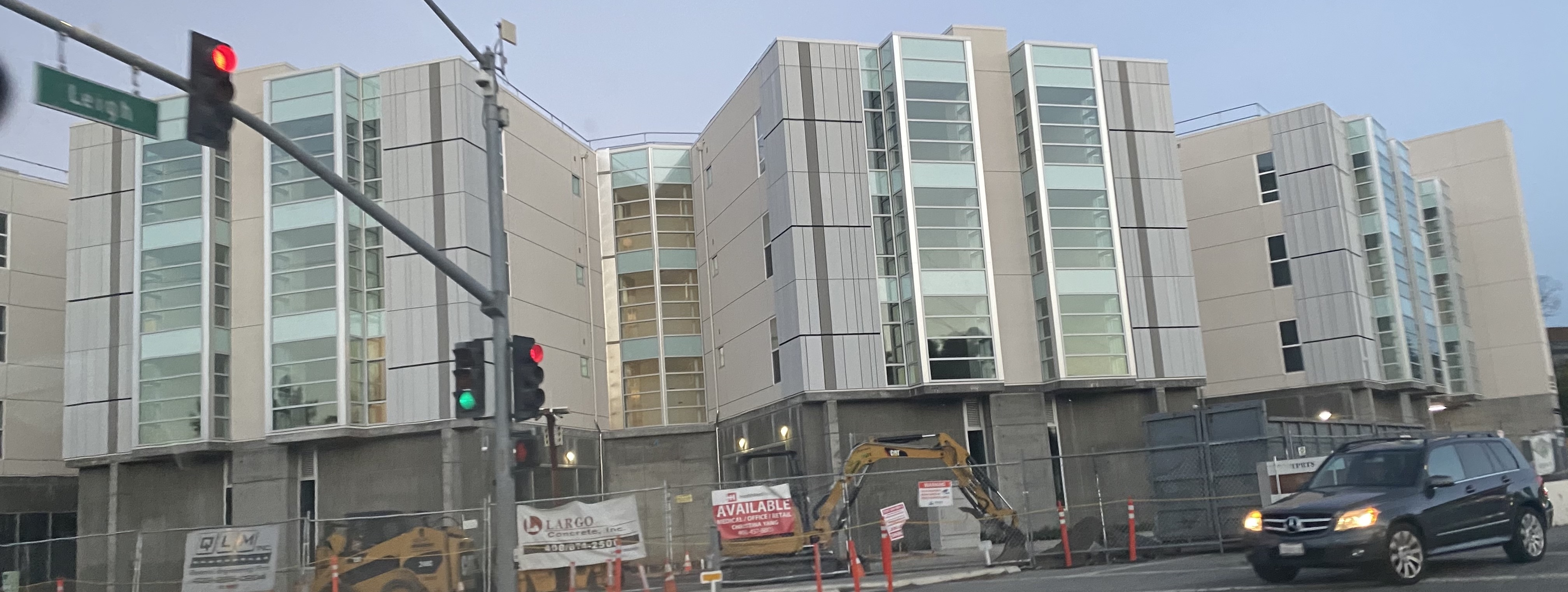

- Location in Santa Clara County and the state of California

- Location in the United States
- Coordinates: 37°18′46″N 121°56′9″W
- Country: United States
- State: California
- County: Santa Clara

Area
  - Total: 0.267 sq mi (0.691 km^{2})
  - Land: 0.267 sq mi (0.691 km^{2})
  - Water: 0 sq mi (0 km^{2}) 0%
- Elevation: 144 ft (44 m)

Population (2020)
  - Total: 989
  - Density: 3,710/sq mi (1,430/km^{2})
- Time zone: UTC-8 (PST)
  - Summer (DST): UTC-7 (PDT)
- ZIP code: 95128
- Area codes: 408/669
- FIPS code: 06-27080
- GNIS feature ID: 1877235

Fruitdale is a district of San Jose, California, United States, though some portions are still unincorporated as a census-designated place. The population of the CDP was 989 at the 2020 census.

== Geography ==
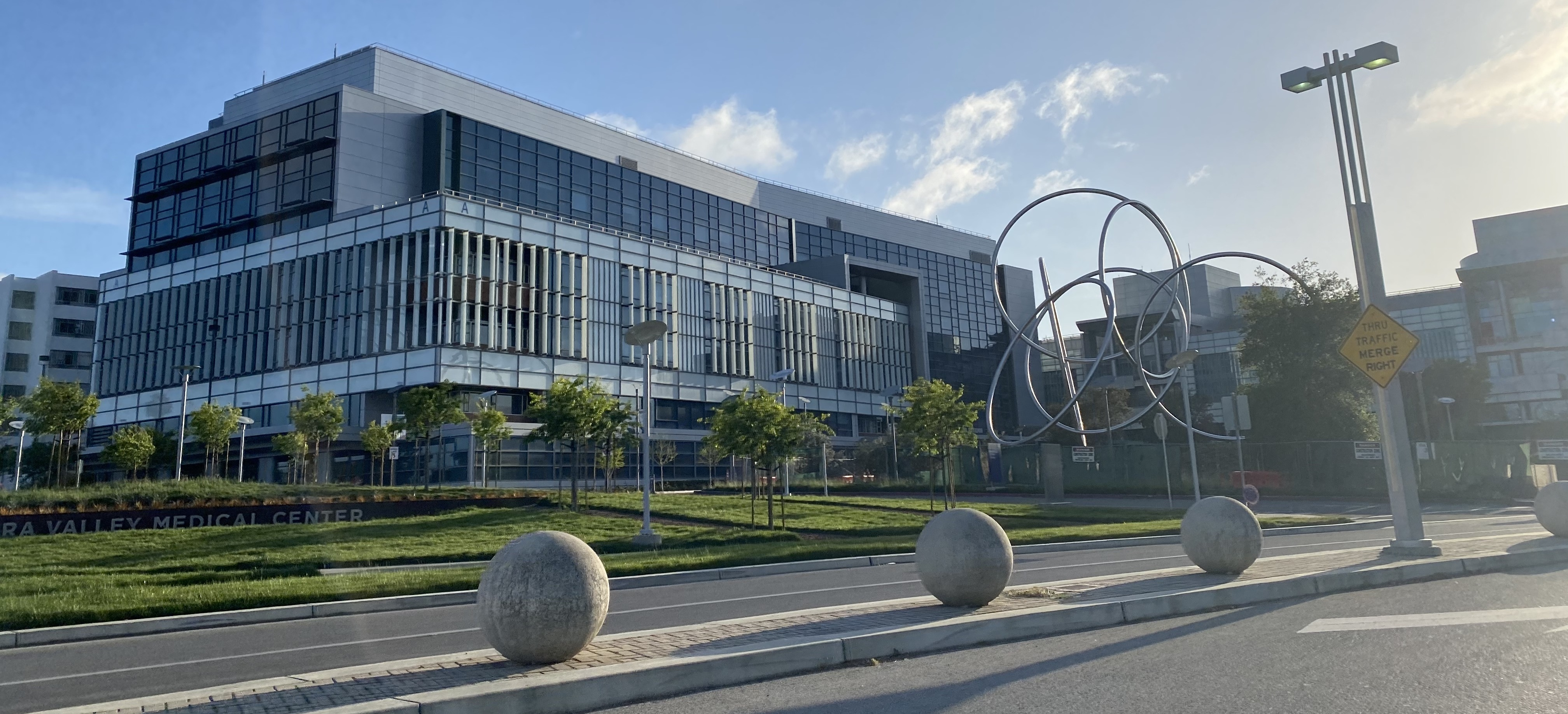
The campus of Valley Medical Center, Silicon Valley's largest hospital.

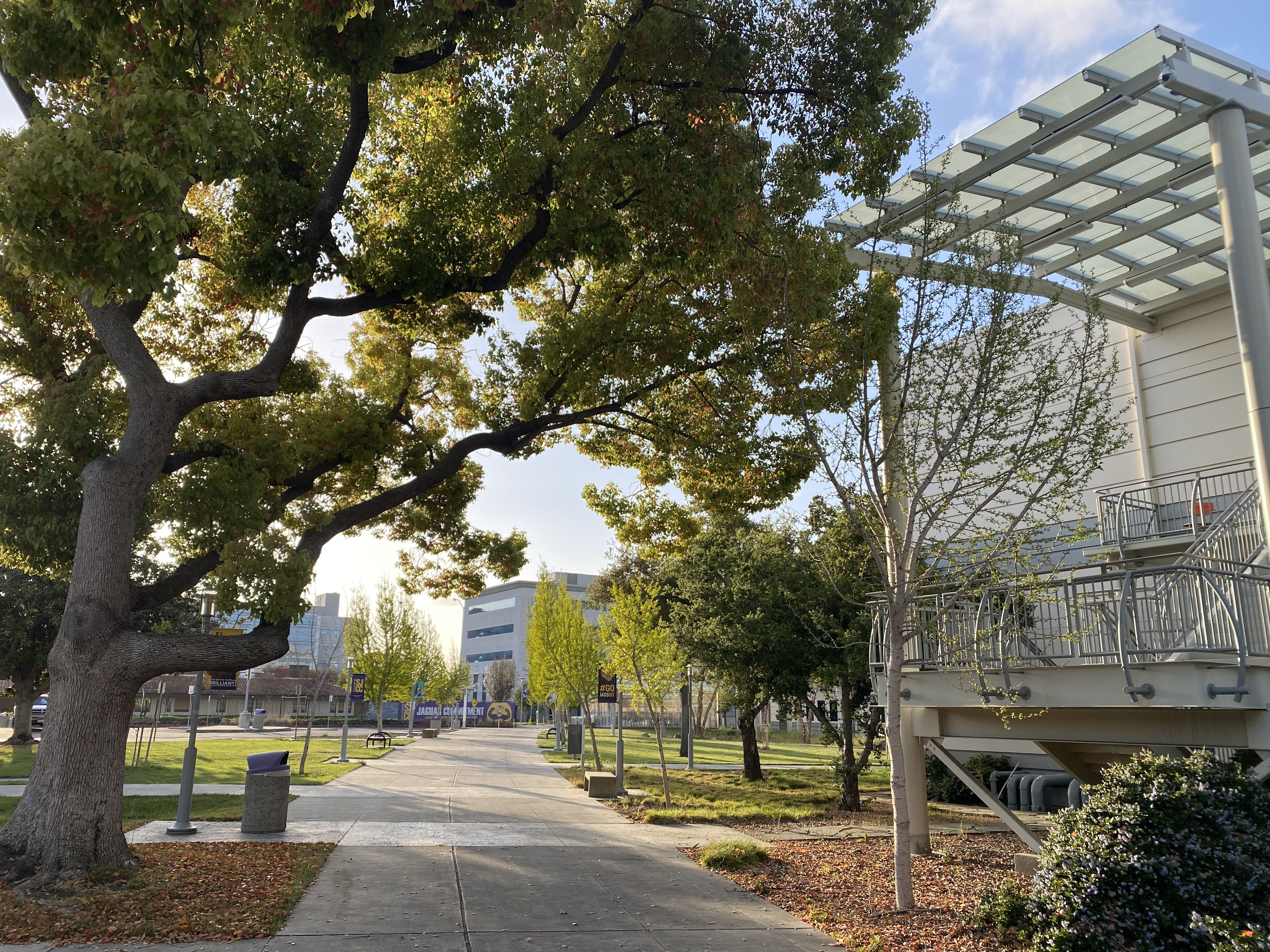
San Jose City College.

Fruitdale is located at 37°18′46″N 121°56′9″W (37.312743, -121.935837). It is bordered on the north, west, and east by San Jose and to the south by Campbell.

According to the United States Census Bureau, the CDP has a total area of 0.3 square miles (0.78 km^{2}), all land.

== Demographics ==
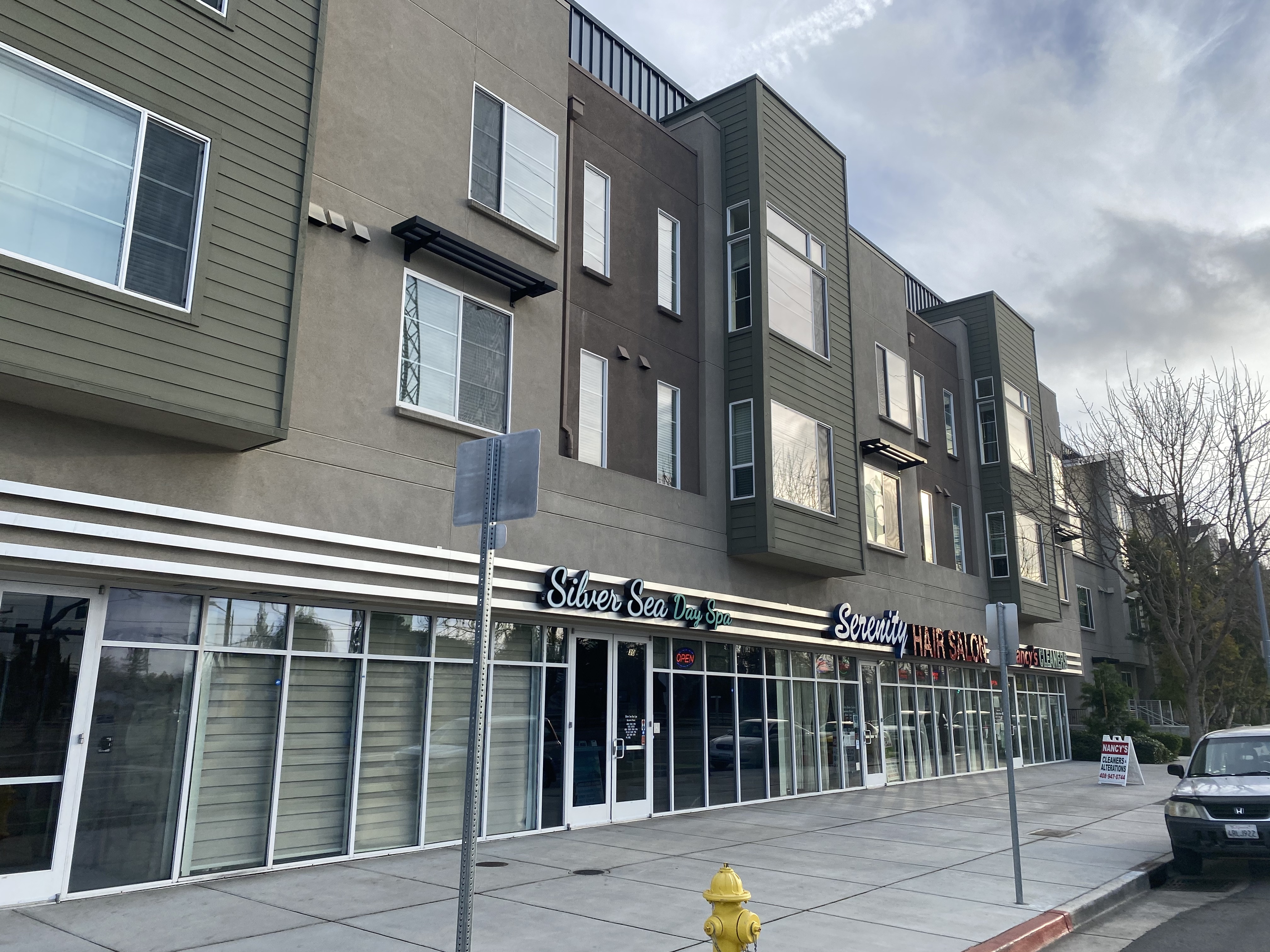
Shops near Fruitdale Station.

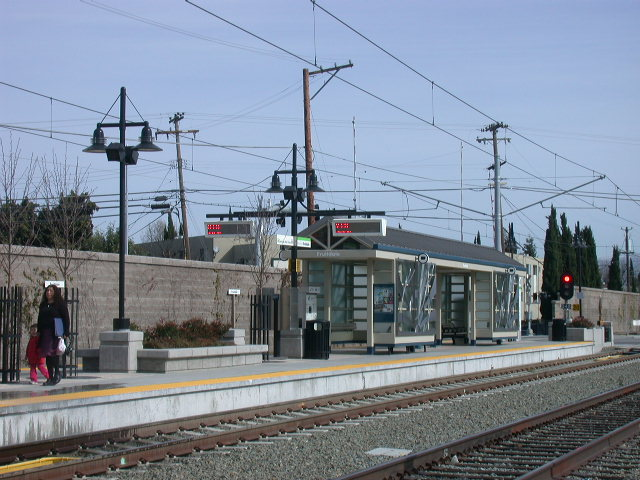
Fruitdale station of the VTA light rail.

Historical population
Census	Pop.	Note	%±
2000	895		—
2010	935		4.5%
2020	989		5.8%
U.S. Decennial Census; 1860–1870 1880-1890; 1900 1910 1920; 1930 1940 1950; 1960 1970 1980; 1990 2000 2010

Fruitdale first appeared as a census designated place in the 2000 U.S. census created from part of Burbank CDP.

=== 2020 ===
The 2020 United States census reported that Fruitdale had a population of 989. The population density was 3,704.1 inhabitants per square mile (1,430.2/km^{2}). The racial makeup of Fruitdale was 527 (53.3%) White, 30 (3.0%) African American, 14 (1.4%) Native American, 146 (14.8%) Asian, 10 (1.0%) Pacific Islander, 94 (9.5%) from other races, and 168 (17.0%) from two or more races. Hispanic or Latino of any race were 273 persons (27.6%).

The census reported that 96.3% of the population lived in households and 3.7% were institutionalized.

There were 410 households, out of which 101 (24.6%) had children under the age of 18 living in them, 148 (36.1%) were married-couple households, 40 (9.8%) were cohabiting couple households, 117 (28.5%) had a female householder with no partner present, and 105 (25.6%) had a male householder with no partner present. 156 households (38.0%) were one person, and 77 (18.8%) were one person aged 65 or older. The average household size was 2.32. There were 214 families (52.2% of all households).

The age distribution was 160 people (16.2%) under the age of 18, 47 people (4.8%) aged 18 to 24, 306 people (30.9%) aged 25 to 44, 291 people (29.4%) aged 45 to 64, and 185 people (18.7%) who were 65 years of age or older. The median age was 43.8 years. For every 100 females, there were 97.4 males.

There were 431 housing units at an average density of 1,614.2 units per square mile (623.2 units/km^{2}), of which 410 (95.1%) were occupied. Of these, 181 (44.1%) were owner-occupied, and 229 (55.9%) were occupied by renters.

=== 2010 ===
The 2010 United States census reported that Fruitdale had a population of 935. The population density was 3,475.3 inhabitants per square mile (1,341.8/km^{2}). The racial makeup of Fruitdale was 633 (67.7%) White, 31 (3.3%) African American, 11 (1.2%) Native American, 110 (11.8%) Asian, 4 (0.4%) Pacific Islander, 88 (9.4%) from other races, and 58 (6.2%) from two or more races. Hispanic or Latino of any race were 244 persons (26.1%).

The Census reported that 861 people (92.1% of the population) lived in households, 26 (2.8%) lived in non-institutionalized group quarters, and 48 (5.1%) were institutionalized.

There were 361 households, out of which 92 (25.5%) had children under the age of 18 living in them, 135 (37.4%) were opposite-sex married couples living together, 39 (10.8%) had a female householder with no husband present, 25 (6.9%) had a male householder with no wife present. There were 24 (6.6%) unmarried opposite-sex partnerships, and 5 (1.4%) same-sex married couples or partnerships. 118 households (32.7%) were made up of individuals, and 29 (8.0%) had someone living alone who was 65 years of age or older. The average household size was 2.39. There were 199 families (55.1% of all households); the average family size was 3.11.

The population was spread out, with 171 people (18.3%) under the age of 18, 80 people (8.6%) aged 18 to 24, 271 people (29.0%) aged 25 to 44, 325 people (34.8%) aged 45 to 64, and 88 people (9.4%) who were 65 years of age or older. The median age was 41.7 years. For every 100 females, there were 100.2 males. For every 100 females age 18 and over, there were 97.9 males.

There were 379 housing units at an average density of 1,408.7 units per square mile (543.9 units/km^{2}), of which 195 (54.0%) were owner-occupied, and 166 (46.0%) were occupied by renters. The homeowner vacancy rate was 1.0%; the rental vacancy rate was 2.9%. 507 people (54.2% of the population) lived in owner-occupied housing units and 354 people (37.9%) lived in rental housing units.

== Landmarks ==
- San Jose City College
- Santa Clara Valley Medical Center
