= Pointer Telocation =

Pointer Telocation Ltd.
- Company type: Public
- Traded as: Nasdaq: PNTR
- Predecessor: Nexus Telocation Systems Ltd.
- Founded: July 17, 1991
- Defunct: October 3, 2019
- Fate: Merged
- Successor: PowerFleet
- Headquarters: Rosh HaAyin, Israel
- Parent: DBSI Investments Ltd.
- Subsidiaries: Shagrir Systems Ltd.
- Website: www.pointer.com

Pointer Telocation was a publicly traded company, headquartered in Israel, that developed automatic vehicle location systems and provided roadside automotive service. Its shares were traded on the NASDAQ Capital Market and were listed on the Tel Aviv Stock Exchange until 2012, and then again starting in April 2016. In October 2019, the company merged with I.D. Systems, Inc., to form PowerFleet.

== Operations ==
Pointer Telocation provided two different motor vehicle-related services: RF- and GPS/GPRS-based automatic vehicle location systems and command-and-control systems for fleet management and stolen vehicle recovery, and, through its Shagrir subsidiary, roadside assistance to motorists.

== Corporate history ==
Pointer was originally the name of a product developed by Nexus Telecommunications Systems Ltd. and marketed by Eden Telecom Ltd., beginning in 1999 with Eden's founding. The product's name was inspired by the Pointer dog breed. At the time of its establishment Eden was a joint venture of four Israeli investors: Motorola, Nexus, Poalim Investments, and Clal. In 1997 Nexus Telecommunications Systems changed its name to Nexus Telocation Systems Ltd. In 2002 Eden changed its name to Pointer. In 2004 Nexus Telocation Systems acquired Pointer and in 2006 changed its name to Pointer Telocation Ltd.

Shaul Elovitch's Eurocom Group began accumulating shares of Pointer in August 2008, acquiring 9.03% of the company. Since December 2008 Eurocom holds 14.66% of Pointer's shares. DBSI Investments controls 37.27% of the company.

=== Management ===
Giora Inbar, formerly commander of the Lebanon Liaison Unit of the Israel Defense Forces, was brought on board Eden Telecom as CEO with the company's founding in 1999. He left the position as part of the 2004–2005 deal to merge Shagrir with Pointer. In 2005 Danny Stern was appointed CEO and president of Pointer. He vacated the positions in 2011, whereupon David Mahlab became Pointer's CEO and president.

=== Acquisitions ===
| Company | Year | Price | Details |
|---|---|---|---|
| Safecom | 2000 | | Acquired by Eden Telecom |
| Shagrir | 2004–2005 | NIS 200 million | |
| Cellocator Ltd. | 2007 | NIS 62 million | |
| Car2Go | 2009 | NIS 6 million | Acquired by Shagrir |
| TCM Transportation Ltd. | 2011 | NIS 2.5 million | Acquired by Shagrir |

== See also ==
- AAA
- Fleet telematics system
- GPS tracking unit
- Ituran
- Telematics
- Track and trace
- Vehicle tracking system
- List of Israeli companies quoted on the Nasdaq
