= Ken Dennis =

American sprinter (1937–2008)

Kenneth Edward Dennis (May 13, 1937 – April 7, 2008 in Las Vegas, Nevada) was an American track and field athlete. As a Masters sprinter he held the world record in the 100 metres in several age groups. Standing 5'3" the short Dennis was known for his soft-spoken nature, his greetings of "Hey man" or "Go man" and his blazing fast starts.

Dennis first began sprinting at Fremont High School in Los Angeles where he opened eyes with a 9.5 100-yard dash before transferring to Centennial High School in Compton. At Centennial, he was joined by Charles Dumas, who had transferred from Jefferson High School. One year removed from winning the Olympic gold medal and being the first person to jump 7 feet, Dumas winning the high jump was a foregone conclusion. But it was Dennis' 13 points winning the 100, second in the 220 behind Bobby Poynter and 4×220 yard relay that led Centennial to the overall team title at the CIF California State Meet in 1955. Dennis was the top high school 100-yard dash man nationwide that year.

Dennis ran collegiately for the University of California.

On September 23, 1983, Dennis set the M45 World Record in the 100 metres at 10.92 in the heats before winning the World Masters Athletics Championships in San Juan, Puerto Rico. His time in the final of 11.03, was intrinsically superior to Thane Baker's existing hand timed world record of 10.8. His record would last for almost 7 years.

Almost four years later, August 14, 1987, Dennis again ran 11.03, this time to set the M50 World Record in the 100 metres at the USATF Masters Championships in Springfield, Oregon. That record would last almost 15 years before being surpassed by Bill Collins.

He won the World Masters Championships in the 100m in 1987 a breath ahead of long time rival Reginald Austin of Australia, himself a former world record holder, who was running on home soil in Melbourne. Both were timed in 11.24. In 1989, on American soil in Eugene, Oregon Dennis handily beat Austin to take another world title. Austin got his revenge winning the 200 metres while Dennis finished second. The next time the two met in the World Championships was 1995 in Buffalo, New York, where Austin came from behind to catch the quick starting Dennis in extremely windy conditions.

On June 24, 2000 he joined rivals Harold Tolson, Doug Smith and Gary Simms in setting the M60 American record in the 4 x 100 metres relay at the Southern California USATF Masters Age Group Championships. That record was surpassed in 2011.

On August 8, 2003, Dennis ran 12.40 to win the USATF Masters Championships again in Eugene in the M65 division ahead of Tolson and Simms. This was the first time anyone had run better than the listed world record 12.53 by Payton Jordan set the same day Dennis ran his M45 record in San Juan. Unfortunately the race was wind aided.

A fixture on the Southern California track circuit, after retiring Dennis moved to Las Vegas. He had to undergo double bypass surgery in 2007, but died during a procedure on his knee.
