= Masters M50 100 metres world record progression =

This is the progression of world record improvements of the 100 metres M50 division of Masters athletics.

Key

Incomplete information Wind aided Pending

Hand	Auto	Wind	Athlete	Nationality	Birthdate	Age	Location	Date	Ref
	10.88	(+1.8 m/s)	Willie Gault	United States	5 September 1960	50 years, 244 days	Los Angeles	7 May 2011	
	10.95	(+1.8 m/s)	Bill Collins	United States	20 November 1950	51 years, 144 days	Baton Rouge	13 April 2002	
	11.03		Ken Dennis	United States	13 May 1937	50 years, 93 days	Eugene	14 August 1987	
	11.24	-3.7	Stephen Robbins	United States	31 January 1943	52 years, 165 days	Buffalo	15 July 1995	
	11.58		Andrew Faure	Venezuela	1933		San Juan	23 September 1983	
11.4			Hermund Hogheim	Norway	1932		Fana	08 June 1983	
11.4			Edmund Schuler	United States	20 June 1927	51 years, 36 days		26 July 1978	
11.4			Alphonse Juilland	United States			Los Angeles	18 June 1973	
