= Masters M45 100 metres world record progression =

This is the progression of world record improvements of the 100 metres M45 division of Masters athletics.

Key

Incomplete information Wind aided Pending

Hand	Auto	Wind	Athlete	Nationality	Birthdate	Age	Location	Date	Ref
	10.72	(±0.0 m/s)	Lion Martinez	Sweden	26 January 1978	45 years, 205 days	Regensdorf	19 August 2023	
	10.72	(+1.0 m/s)	Willie Gault	United States	5 September 1960	45 years, 289 days	Indianapolis	21 June 2006	
	10.96	(−2.6 m/s)	Neville Hodge	U.S. Virgin Islands	8 December 1955	45 years, 140 days	Philadelphia	27 April 2001	
	11.18	(+0.8 m/s)	Stephen Peters	Great Britain	5 July 1953	47 years, 24 days	Bedford	29 July 2000	
	11.23	(−1.1 m/s)	Stephen Peters	Great Britain	5 July 1953	46 years, 0 days	Bergen	5 July 1999	
	10.90	NWI	Thaddeus Bell	United States	28 November 1942	47 years, 154 days	Raleigh	1 May 1990	
	10.92	NWI	Ken Dennis	United States	13 May 1937	46 years, 133 days	San Juan	23 September 1983	
	11.25	(±0.0 m/s)	Lloyd Riddick	United States	26 June 1934	45 years, 32 days	Hannover	28 July 1979	
10.8 h		NWI	Thane Baker	United States	4 October 1931	46 years, 235 days	Los Angeles	27 May 1978	
11.1 h		NWI	George Rhoden	Jamaica	13 December 1926	45 years, 187 days		17 June 1972	
