= Pointing (disambiguation) =

Pointing may refer to:

- Pointing, the hand gesture
  - Pointing, a hand signal in the sport of pickleball indicating the ball is out
- Ostensive definition
- Pointing, the external part of the mortar between bricks in walling (see repointing)
- Pointing, the characteristic stance of pointing breeds of dogs used for hunting
- The position accuracy of the optical axis (boresight) of a directional antenna
- The process of adding vowel points to an abjad consonantal alphabet, such as niqqud in Hebrew and harakat in Arabic
- The process of distinguishing consonants with points, called dagesh in Hebrew and i'jam in Arabi
- In dated language, punctuation
- In sung psalmody, various methods of marking melodic inflections of Gregorian psalm tones and Anglican chants

== See also ==
- Poynting (disambiguation)
- Point (disambiguation)
- Pointer (disambiguation)
