= San Jose City College =

Community college in San Jose, California, US

Coordinates: 37.3148°N 121.9280°W

San José City College
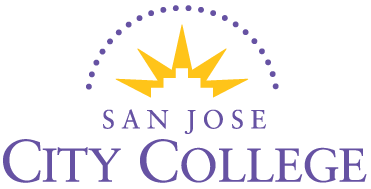
- Type: Public community college
- Established: 1921
- Parent institution: California Community; College System (San José-Evergreen Community College District)
- President: Marilyn Flores
- Students: 10,139 (2012)
- Location: Fruitdale, San Jose, California, United States
- Colours: Purple, gold
- Nickname: Jaguars
- Website: Official website
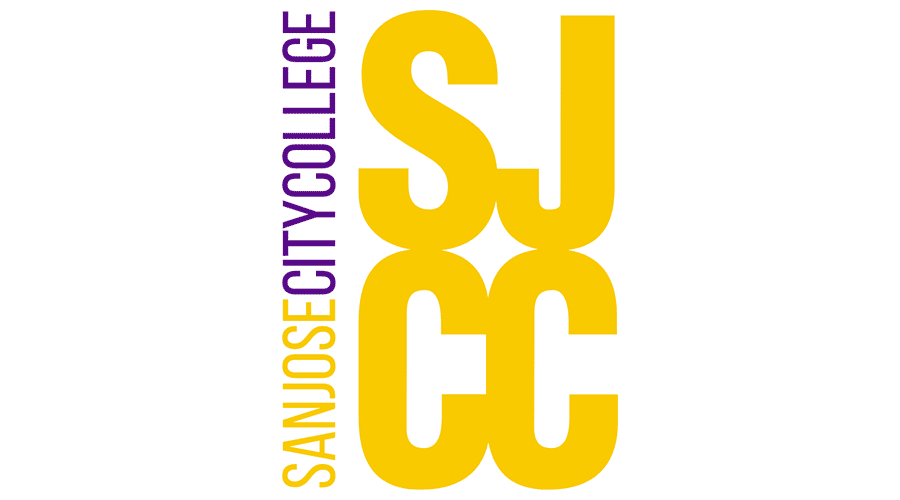

San José City College (SJCC) is a public community college in San Jose, California. It was founded in 1921, and is one of the oldest colleges in the California Community College System.

== History ==
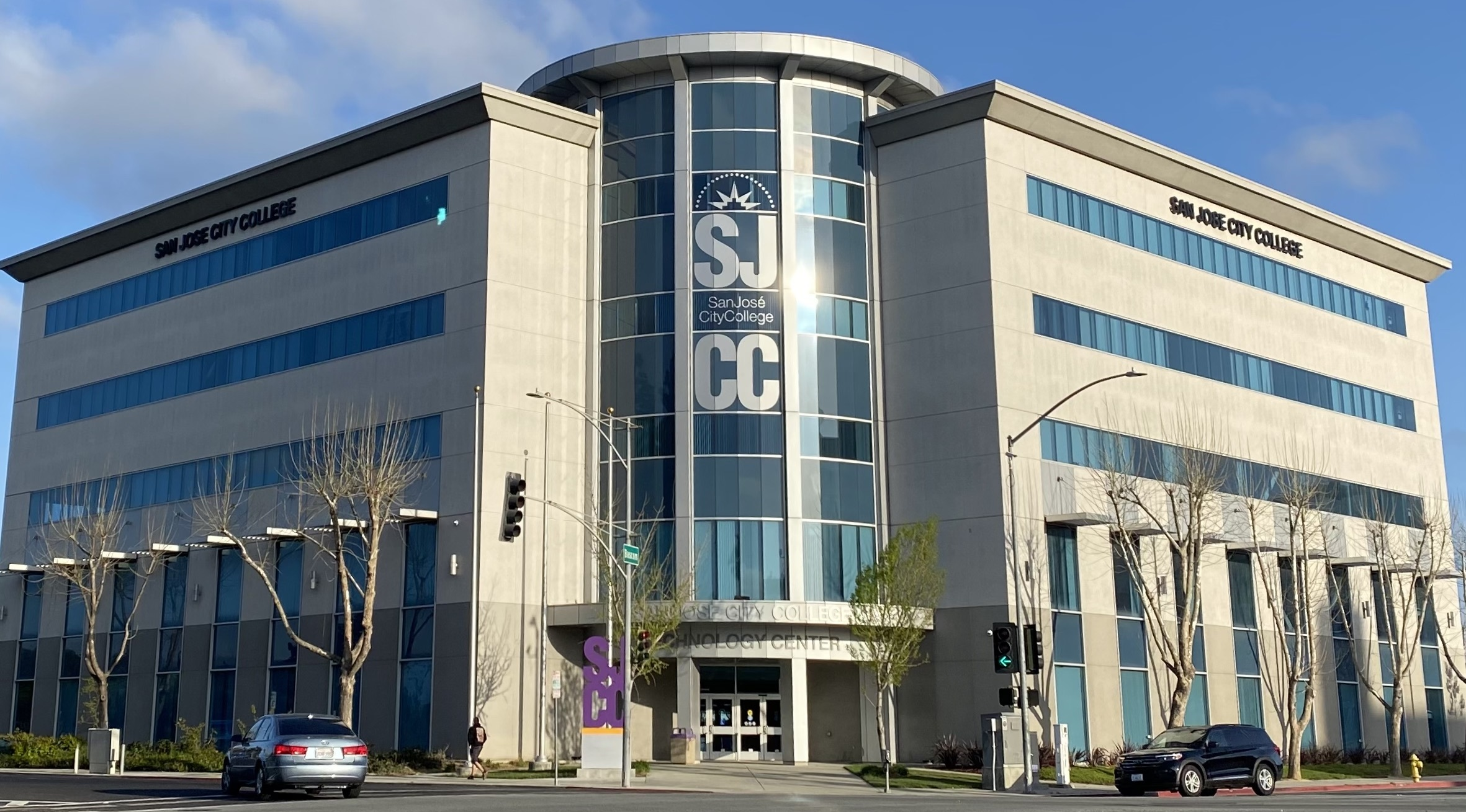
SJCC Technology Center.

The college was founded in 1921, opening its doors as San José Junior College to students in September of that year.

In 1953, San José Unified School District took over the college's operation from San José State University. The college moved to its present location in the Fruitdale neighborhood of West San Jose in the same year. The college's name changed to "San José City College" in 1958.

In 1999, 2004 and 2010, voters within the San José-Evergreen Community College District passed bond measures to re-build the campus and provide modern technology and facilities for the students, which resulted in the construction of buildings like San José City College Library, the Science Complex, Carmen Castellano Fine Arts Center, and the SJCC Student Center.

== Campus ==
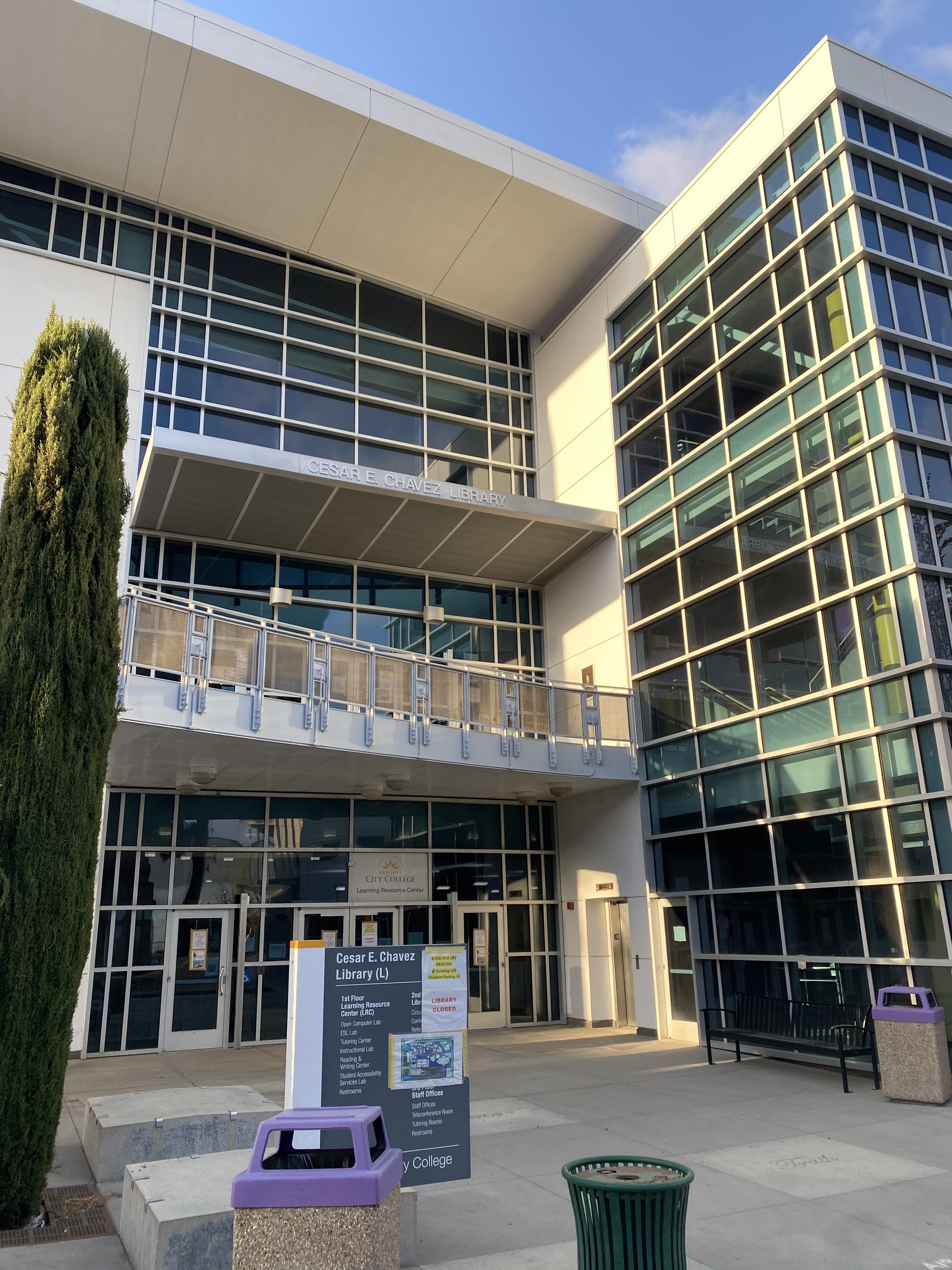
San José City College Library.

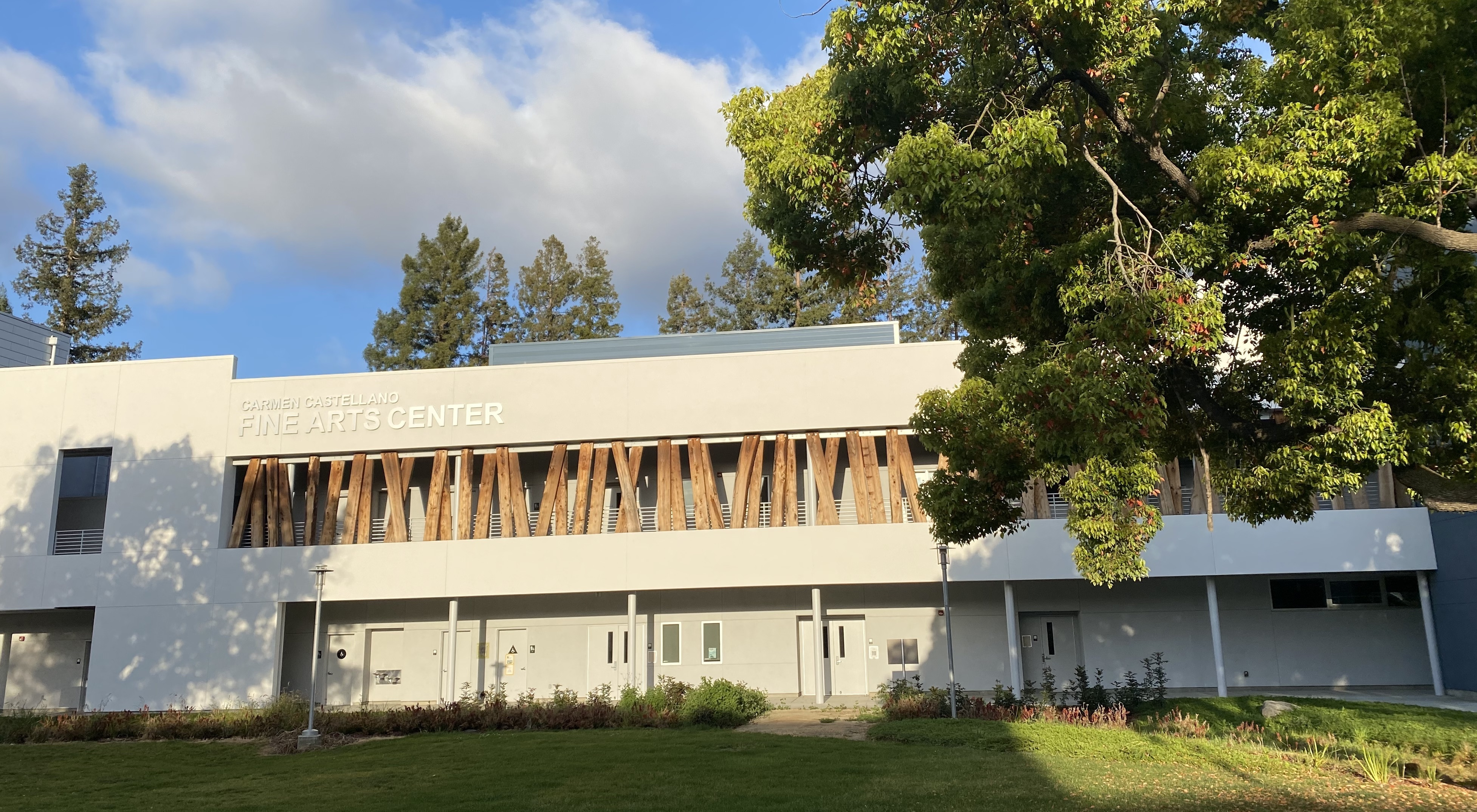
Carmen Castellano Fine Arts Center.

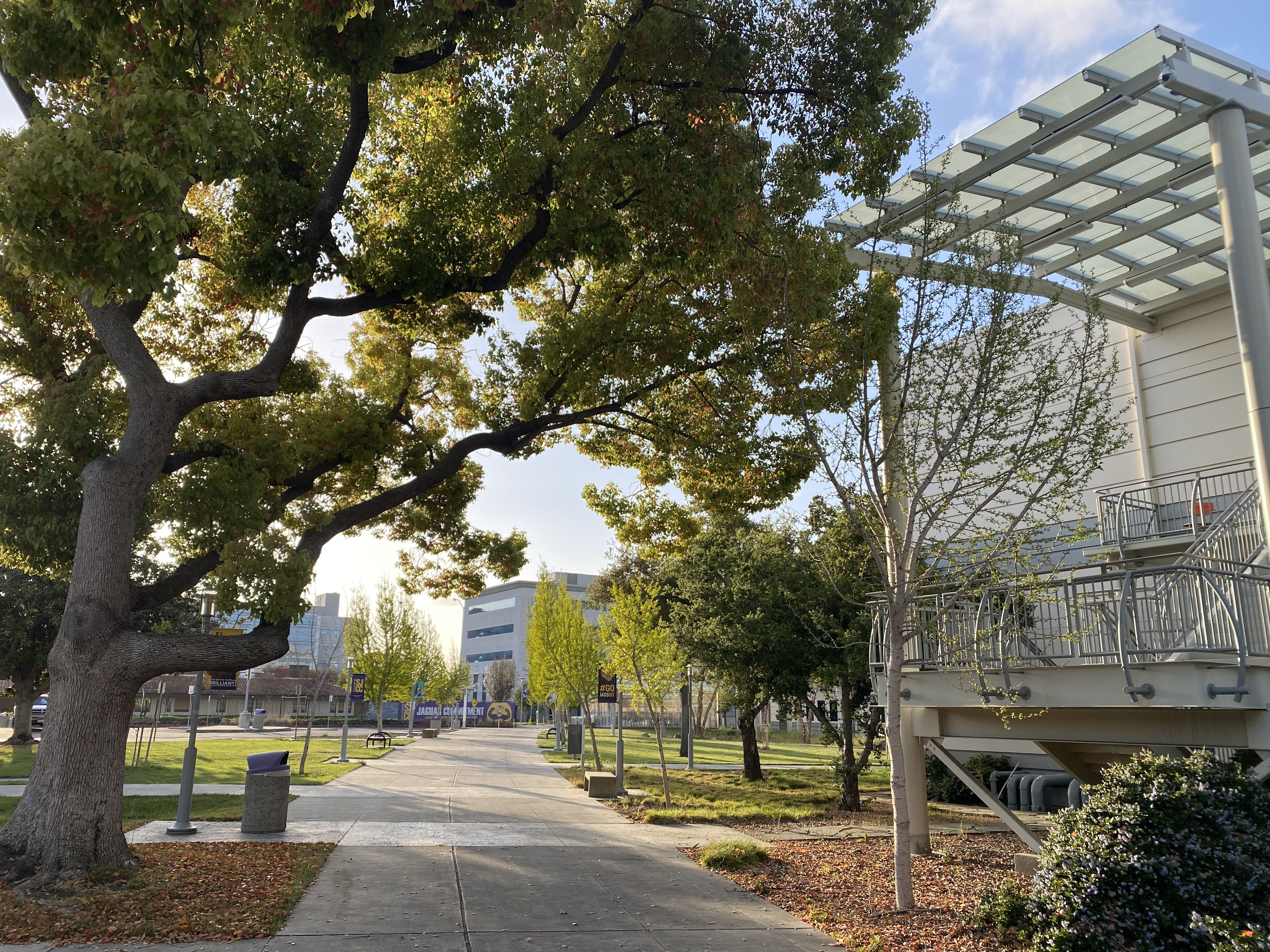
SJCC's campus.

SJCC's campus is located in West San Jose, in the neighborhood of Fruitdale. It is bound by Bascom Ave to the west, Leigh Ave to the east, and Moorpark Ave to the north. Notable buildings on campus include the San José City College Library, the Science Complex, the Robert N. Chang Student Center, the Carmen N. Castellano Fine Arts Center, and the Technology Center, among others.

=== San José City College Library ===
The library opened in June 2003. It features wireless internet access and data ports throughout the building, an electronic research laboratory with 30 personal computers, an electronic whiteboard, and a variety of learning software.

=== Carmen N. Castellano Fine Arts Center ===
The Carmen N. Castellano Fine Arts Center opened in 2012. It is named after longtime local arts advocate and community organizer Carmen N. Castellano. The center includes a fine arts gallery, a theatre and performance space, and classrooms for relevant departments.

=== KJCC ===
KJCC 104.1 FM is a low-power FM radio station operated by San José City College students. KJCC began broadcasting in 1978. Radio classes were cancelled in fall 1994 due to budget cuts; the station has since been operated by campus clubs.

== Athletics ==
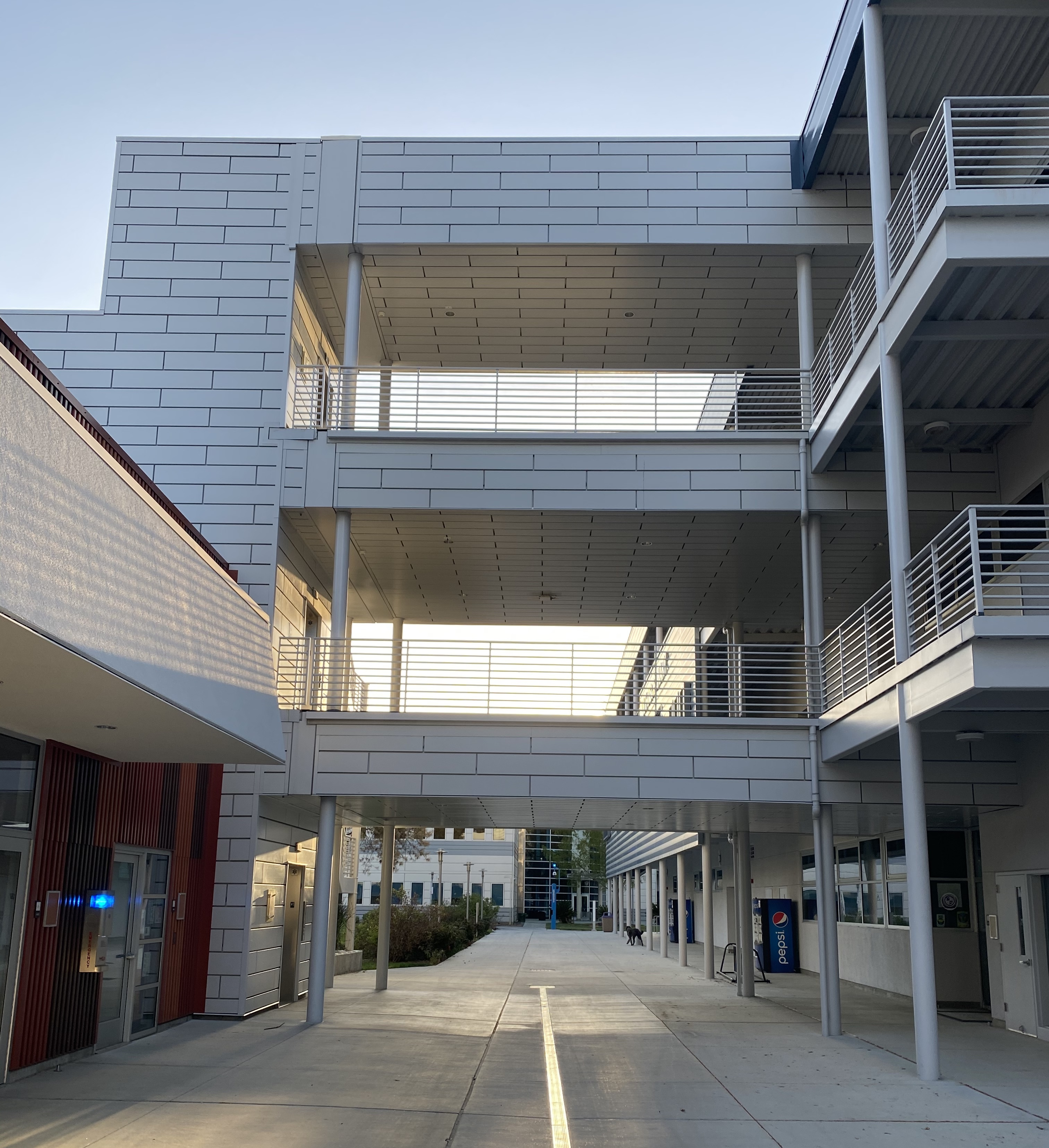
Multi-Disciplinary Building.

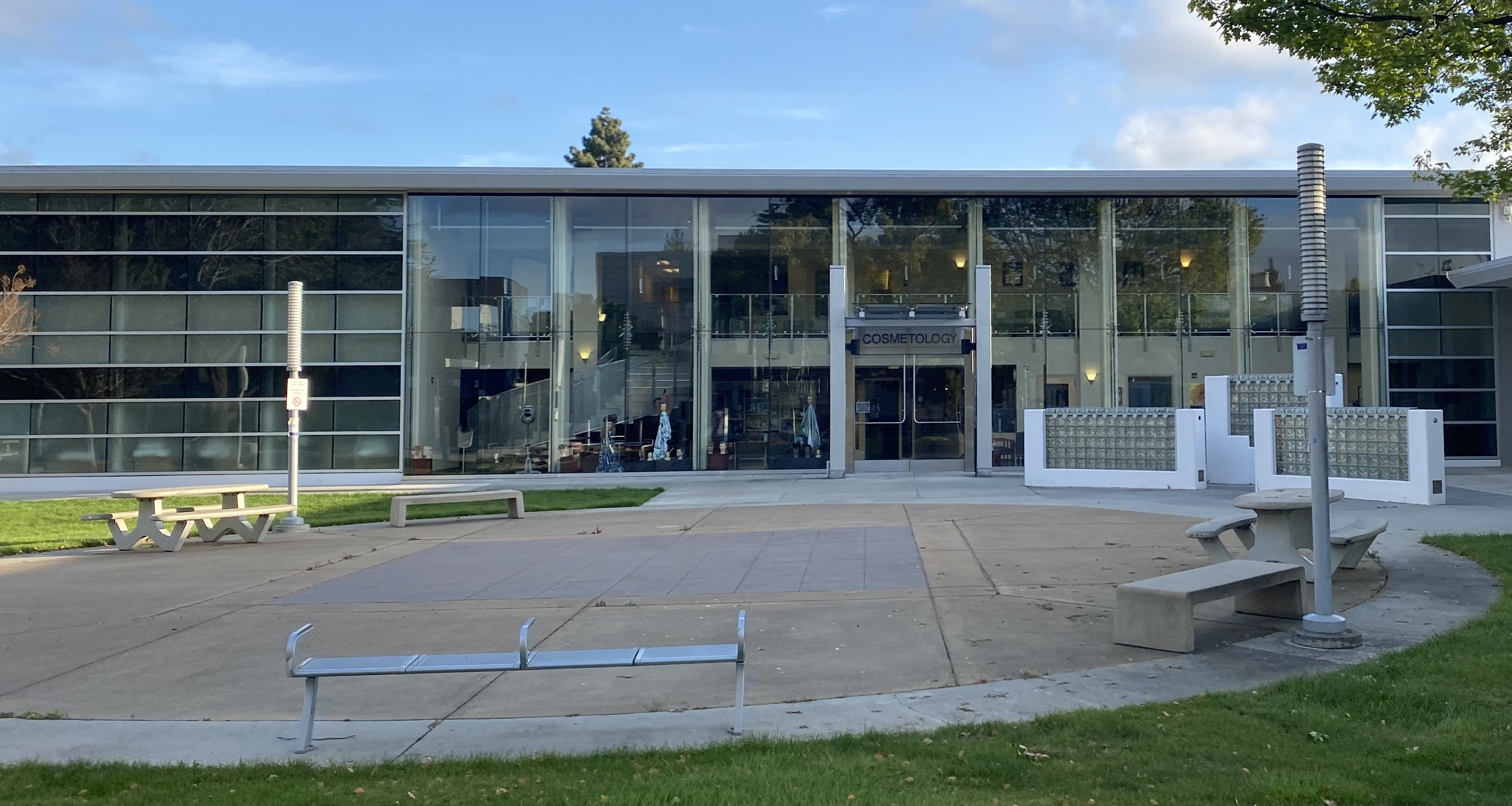
Cosmetology Department.

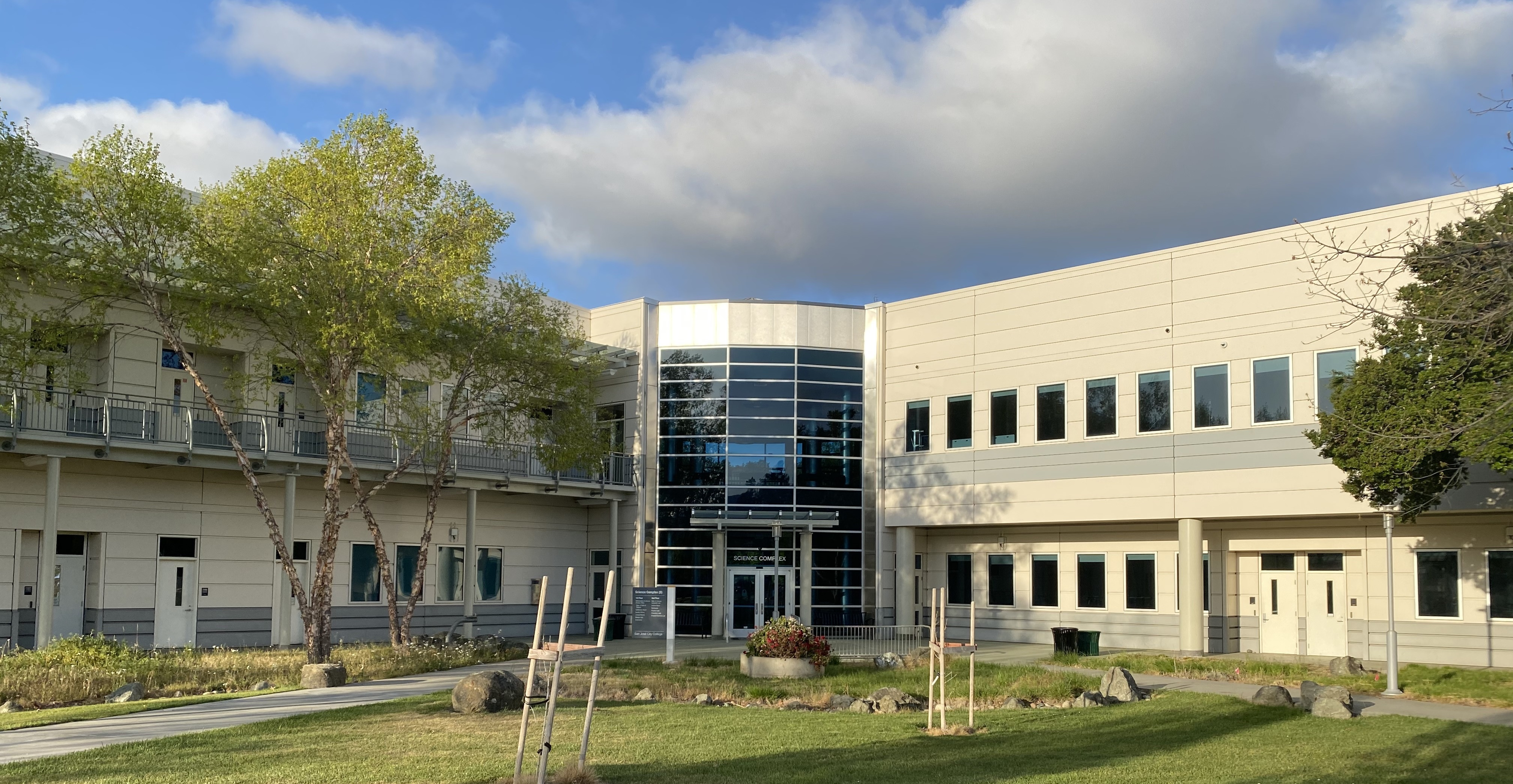
SJCC Science Complex.

San José City College is home to the Jaguars athletic program. A $1.7 million capital improvements plan includes a weight and fitness training complex open to all students, featuring weight and cardiovascular equipment. During the 1970s, SJCC was a prominent training hub for Olympic track and field athletes. Under the supervision of coach Bert Bonanno, Caitlyn Jenner (then competing as Bruce Jenner) trained at the track before winning the 1976 Olympic decathlon gold medal. Alumni Millard Hampton and Andre Phillips both won Olympic gold medals, with coaching assistance from Bobby Poynter, who was part of San José State University's "Speed City" track program and also served as their coach and teacher at Silver Creek High School (California). The throwing facilities were home to gold medalist Mac Wilkins, Al Feuerbach, and John Powell, all three of whom became world record holders; Wilkins and Feuerbach set their records at San José City College. Following Jenner's victory at the 1976 Montreal Olympics, Bonanno established the Bruce Jenner Invitational, an annually televised meet considered among the top domestic competitions for elite athletes, comparable in stature to today's Prefontaine Classic. Bonanno also created a local high school invitational honoring Hampton and Phillips. In 1984 and 1987, San José City College hosted the USA Outdoor Track and Field Championships. In February 2018, men's basketball head coach Percy Carr reached 900 career wins, becoming the all-time winningest Black head coach in college basketball history.

== Notable people ==
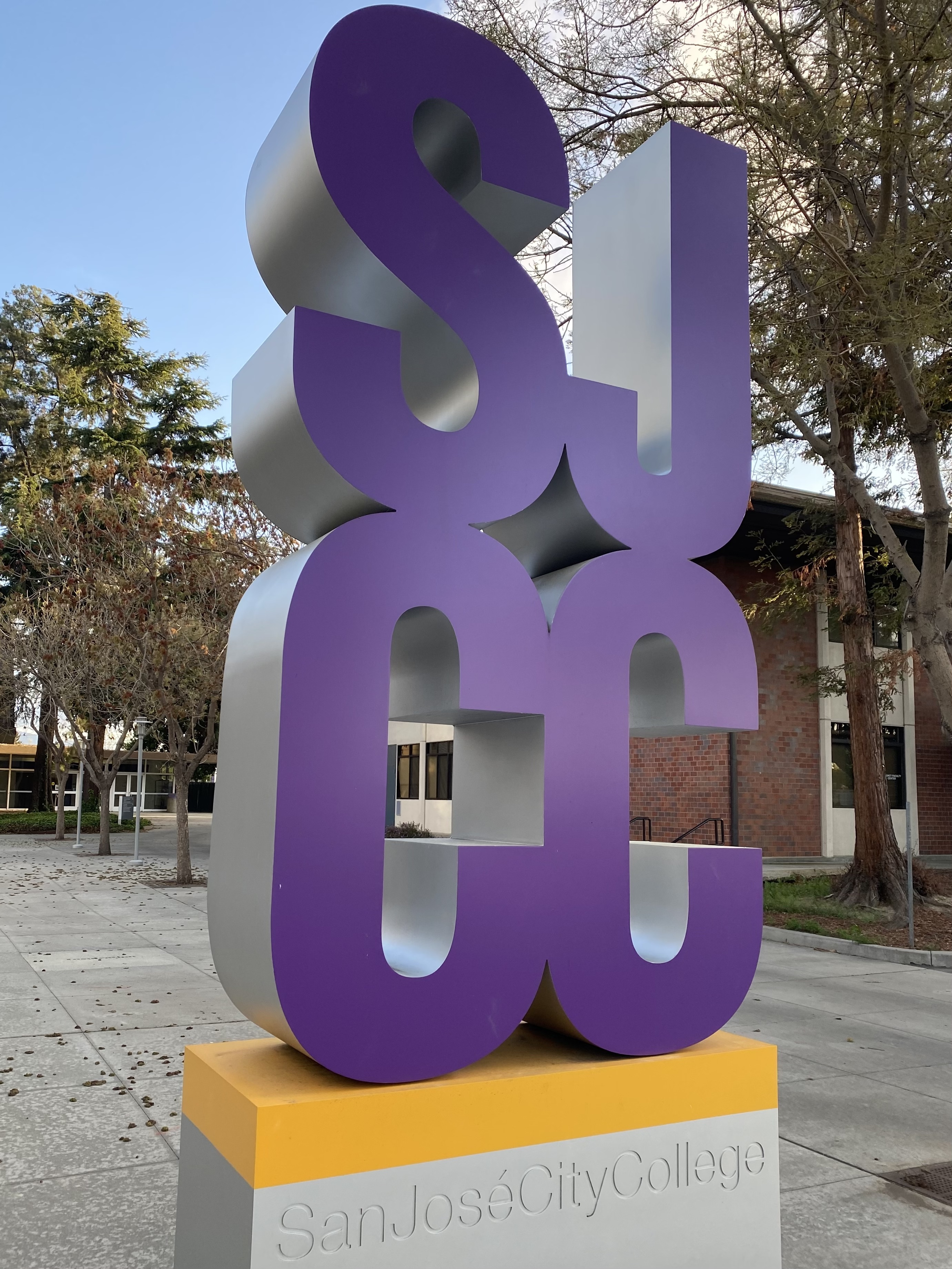

=== Alumni ===
- Amy Tan, National Book Award-winning author of The Joy Luck Club
- Ato Boldon, Olympics gold-medalist
- Bob Mead, member of the New Hampshire House of Representatives
- Bob Toledo, head coach for the UCLA Bruins football
- Chris Cain, Blues Music Award-winning musician
- Dave Laut, two time NCAA-champion athlete
- Dave Righetti, All-Star player for the New York Yankees
- Dave Stieb All-Star player for the Toronto Blue Jays
- Diamara Planell, Olympic athlete
- Erik Bakich, coach of the Michigan Wolverines
- Johnpaul Jones, award-winning architect of the National Museum of the American Indian
- Scott Erickson, 1991 World Series-champion baseball player
- Sonia Sheridan, founder of Generative Systems
- Marcos Pinedo, notable art dealer and collector
- Millard Hampton, Olympic silver-medalist

=== Faculty ===
- Marie E. Johnson-Calloway, mixed-media artist
- John Shrader, Professor of Journalism, has an extensive background in television and radio sports anchoring and sports reporting. For more than 15 years, John was a sports anchor/sports reporter/talk show host for KNBR Radio in San Francisco. He was a television sports anchor in San Jose for ten years, first at KNTV-TV and then KICU-TV. He also was the San Jose Sharks intermission host and rink-side reporter for the 2006–07 season on FSN Bay Area.
