= Bud Winter Field =

Coordinates: 37.3212°N 121.8653°W

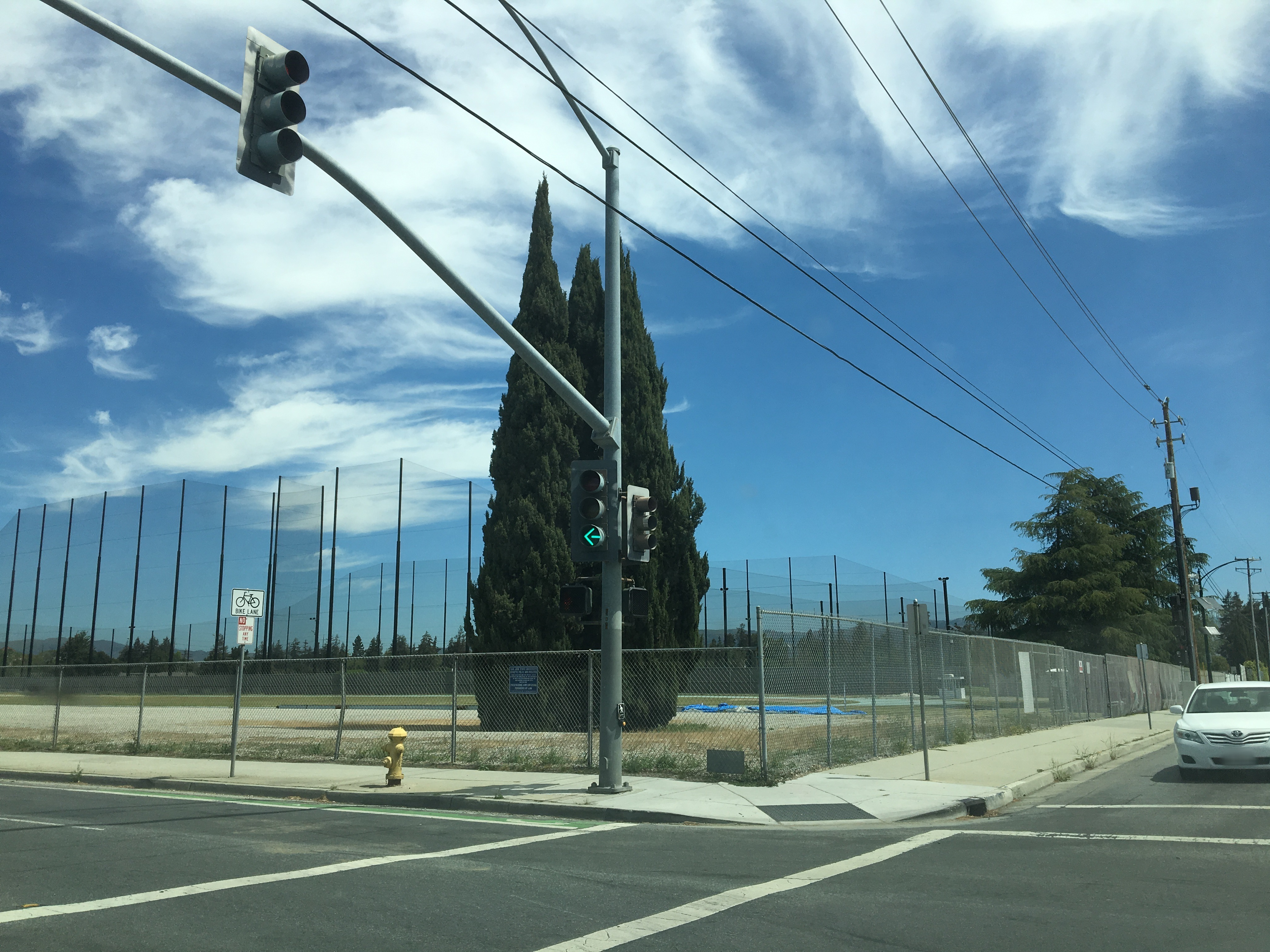
Bud Winter Field in 2018 with the Spartan Golf Complex behind it.

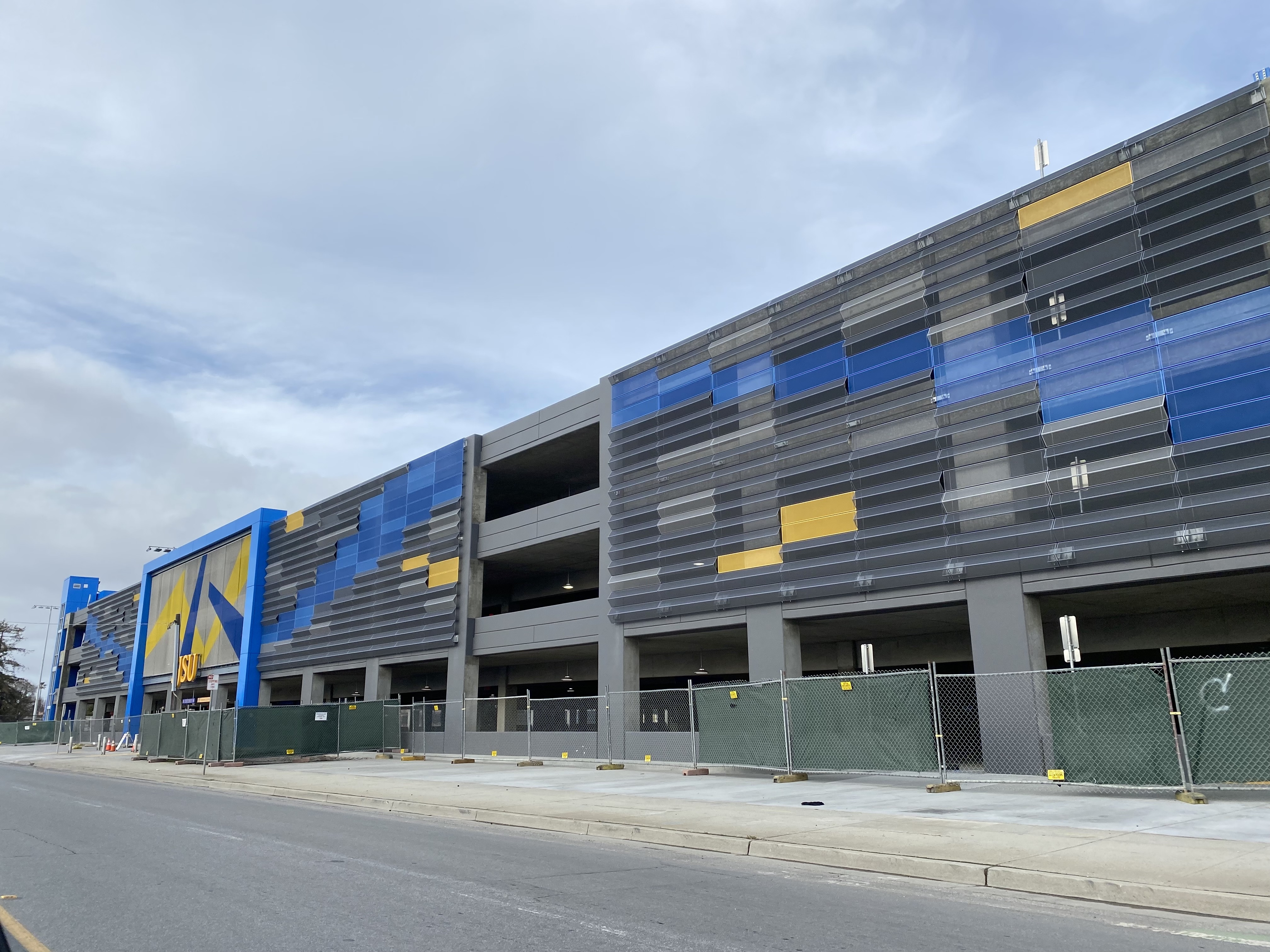
The SJSU Sports Complex parking garage that replaced the field.

Bud Winter Field was the track and field arena used by the San Jose State Spartans track and field team, named after former coach Lloyd "Bud" Winter. Out of the athletes Winter coached, 102 were All-Americans, earning the university the nickname "Speed City".

Olympians and activists Tommie Smith and John Carlos trained on the track before their famous 1968 Olympics Black Power salute in Mexico City.

The field was demolished in 2019. A parking garage has been built on the site. A replacement track on the parking garage's rooftop was abandoned due to its projected cost. A tribute to the Speed City is planned for the site. In 2022, the university began raising funds to build a $25 million Speed City Legacy Center, including a replacement track, at the Santa Clara County Fairgrounds nearby.
