= Pointer (surname) =

Pointer is a surname. Notable persons with the name include:

- Aaron Pointer (born 1942), American baseball player
- Anita Pointer (1948–2022), American singer and songwriter
- Ben Pointer (born 1996), English rugby league player
- Bonnie Pointer (1950–2020), American singer
- Chris Pointer (born 1976), American football defensive back
- Dick Pointer (before 1778 – 1827), American frontier hero
- Ernest Pointer (1872– after 1900), English footballer
- Fred Pointer, Australian Paralympic athlete and wheelchair basketball player
- Grant Pointer (born 1987), English rugby union player
- Issa Pointer (born 1978), American singer
- John Pointer (cricketer) (1782–1815), English cricketer
- John Pointer (antiquary) (1668–1754), English cleric and antiquary
- John Pointer (American football) (born 1958), American football player
- Joseph Pointer (1875–1914), English patternmaker and politician
- June Pointer (1953–2006), American singer
- Mick Pointer (born 1956), English drummer
- Priscilla Pointer (1924–2025), American actress
- Quinton Pointer (born 1988), American football cornerback
- Ray Pointer (1936–2016), English footballer
- Ruth Pointer (born 1946), American singer and songwriter
- Sadako Pointer (born 1984), American singer
- Sam C. Pointer Jr. (1934–2008), American judge
- Sir'Dominic Pointer (born 1992), American basketball player
- Stanley Pointer, South Australian architect in practice with Herbert Jory (1888–1966)
- Vena Pointer (1880–1971), American lawyer

== See also ==
- The Pointer Sisters
- Poynter
