= Millard Hampton =

American sprinter (born 1956)

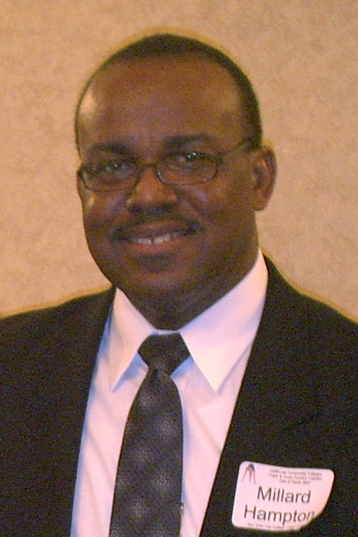
- Hampton in 2006

Personal information
- Full name: Millard Frank Hampton Jr.
- Born: July 8, 1956 (age 70) Fresno, California, U.S.
Medal record
Men's athletics
Representing the United States
Olympic Games
Gold medal – first place	1976 Montreal	4 × 100 metres relay
Silver medal – second place	1976 Montreal	200 metres

Millard Frank Hampton Jr. (born July 8, 1956) is an American former athlete, winner of gold medal in 4 × 100 m relay and the individual silver medal in the 200 meters at the 1976 Summer Olympics.

Born in Fresno, California, Millard Hampton was an AAU champion in 200 m in 1976. His father, Millard Hampton Sr. was a top sprinter in his own right, placing as high as second in the CIF California State Meet 220 yards in 1952.

Millard Hampton attended Silver Creek High School in San Jose, California, where he was coached by former San Jose State great Bobby Poynter, graduating in 1974 and continues to hold the school record in the 100 m at 10.4 sec. and the 200 m record at 20.8 sec. While at Silver Creek, in 1974 he won the CIF California State Meet title that had eluded his father.

Next Hampton went to San Jose City College (SJCC) where he was coached by Bobby Poynter and Bert Bonanno. While at SJCC, Hampton won the 1976 Olympic Trials and at the Montreal Olympics, Hampton won silver medal in the 200 meters and ran the third leg in the gold medal winning American 4 × 100 metres relay team.

Hampton continued his education at UCLA and was considered a favorite for another Olympic team before the 1980 Summer Olympics boycott.

Another Silver Creek graduate, Andre Phillips won the gold medal in the 400 metres hurdles at the 1988 Summer Olympics, making for a rare instance when two Olympic Gold medalists have come from the same high school. The high school website claims eight schools. The school has honored both by hosting the "Hampton Phillips Classic" named in their honor.

He currently resides in Elk Grove, CA

Sporting positions
Preceded by (Jamaica) Donald Quarrie	Men's 200 metres best year performance 1976	Succeeded by (Cuba) Silvio Leonard
