= Powerfleet =

American communication equipment company

Powerfleet, Inc.
- Formerly: I.D. Systems Inc.
- Type: Public
- Traded as: Nasdaq: AIOT
- Industry: Communications Equipment
- Founded: 1993; 33 years ago
- Headquarters: Woodcliff Lake, New Jersey, United States
- Key people: Steve Towe (CEO); David Wilson (CFO); Offer Lehmann (COO); Jonathan Bates (CMO)
- Number of employees: 2,500+
- Website: www.powerfleet.com

Powerfleet, Inc. (formerly I.D. Systems, Inc.) is an American company headquartered in Woodcliff Lake, New Jersey, with offices located around the globe and a technology innovation center in Israel. The company is a global provider of wireless IoT and M2M solutions for securing, controlling, tracking, and managing high-value enterprise assets such as industrial trucks, tractor trailers, intermodal shipping containers, cargo, and vehicle and truck fleets.

== Overview ==
Powerfleet was formed on October 3, 2019 when I.D. Systems acquired Pointer Telocation Ltd. and their subsidiary brand Cellocator, and subsequently rebranded the new company as Powerfleet Inc.

Powerfleet provides a technology suite that delivers telematics, asset tracking, freight visibility, and driver behavior reporting and modification.

== History ==
I.D. Systems was founded in 1993 by Kenneth S. Ehrman. The company introduced the use of radio frequency identification (RFID) technology for industrial asset tracking and management. In 1995, I.D. Systems was awarded a $6.6 million contract from U.S. Postal Service (USPS) to develop and implement a tracking system for test letters and packages. I.D. Systems went public on the NASDAQ in 1999.

In 2005, I.D. Systems received a three-year contract from the U.S. Postal Service to implement its Wireless Asset Net, a wireless industrial vehicle management system, at 460 USPS facilities nationwide. In 2009, I.D. Systems acquired didBOX Ltd., a privately held, United Kingdom-based manufacturer and marketer of driver identification systems for forklift fleets. The acquisition made didBOX a wholly owned subsidiary of I.D. Systems, broadened I.D. Systems' product line, and expanded sales of the company's vehicle management solutions in the European market.

In 2010, I.D. Systems acquired GE Asset Intelligence, LLC, a business unit of the General Electric Company. The acquisition expanded the scope of I.D. Systems' product line and complemented its portfolio of wireless asset management patents.

In 2011, I.D. Systems and Avis Budget Group signed an exclusive agreement to deploy I.D. Systems' wireless vehicle management technology on more than 25,000 Avis Budget vehicles, enabling Avis customers to self-manage their rentals by computer or smartphone. The technology can also automate and expedite the rental and return process, track vehicle mileage, measure fuel consumption, and remotely control a vehicle's door locks. In February 2013, the company was awarded its second patent (patent number 8370268) for an automated wireless rental car management system.

In 2012, the company launched I.D. Systems Analytics, a set of web-based data reporting software tools.

In 2017, the company acquired Keytroller LLC for $9 million. Keytroller sold electronic products for managing forklifts, construction vehicles, and other industrial equipment.

Finally, in 2019 the company acquired Pointer Telocation LTD and renamed itself as Powerfleet Inc. As part of this change, the company retired its NASDAQ ticker symbol of IDSY and adopted PWFL.

== Awards and recognitions ==
- Material Handling Product News (MHPN) fourth-annual Readers’ Choice Products of the Year Awards for Powerfleet Essence.
- 2014 M2M Evolution IoT Excellence Award for its Powerfleet wireless vehicle management system.
- Named one of the top 100 technology solutions providers to the food and beverage industry by Food Logistics, a trade publication.
- Ranked 308th on Deloitte's Technology Fast 500 list.
