= Poynting =

Poynting may refer to:

- John Henry Poynting (1852–1914), a British physicist, after whom are named:
  - Poynting vector, a representation of the energy flux of an electromagnetic field
  - Poynting's theorem on conservation of energy in electromagnetic field
  - Poynting (lunar crater), crater on the Moon
  - Poynting (Martian crater), crater on Mars
  - 11063 Poynting, a main-belt asteroid

== See also ==
- Pointing, a gesture
- Pointing (disambiguation)
