= Poynter =

Poynter is an English occupational surname for the maker of cord that fastened doublet with hose (clothing). The name derives from the Middle English "poynte" and originally from the Latin "puncta", meaning to pierce. Poynter may also be an Anglicised variant of the Huguenot name 'Pointier'.

== Notable people ==
- Ambrose Poynter (1796–1886), British architect
- Andrew Poynter (born 1987), English-born Irish cricketer
- Beulah Poynter (1883–1960), American actress and author
- Dougie Poynter (born 1987), English musician
- Edward Poynter (1836–1919), British painter
- Jane Poynter, American author, businesswoman, and environmentalist
- James I. Poynter (1916–1950), United States Medal of Honor recipient
- Nelson Poynter (1903–1978), American publisher
- Noël Poynter (1908–1979), British librarian and medical historian
- Rikki Poynter (born 1991), deaf American YouTuber and activist
- Robert Poynter (born 1937), American sprinter
- Stuart Poynter (born 1990), English-born Irish cricketer
- William Poynter (1762–1827, English Catholic bishop
- William A. Poynter (1848–1909), the 14th Governor of Nebraska, 1899–1901

== See also ==
- Poynter Institute, a non-profit journalism organization
- Pointer (surname)
- Poynter Baronets
