= Pointer (magazine) =

- Categories: Military science
- Frequency: Quarterly
- Publisher: Goh Keng Swee Command and Staff College
- Country: Singapore
- ISSN: 0217-3956 (print); 2717-5227 (web)
- OCLC: 739928747

Pointer is the official journal of the Singapore Armed Forces (SAF). Established in 1975, it is issued quarterly, and read primarily by SAF officers, warrant officers, and clerks of the Ministry of Defence (MINDEF). It is also distributed to various international military and defence-related organisations.

The stated aim of Pointer is to "engage, educate and promote professional reading among SAF officers, and encourage them to think, debate, and discuss professional military issues."

Contributors are mostly SAF officers, and local and foreign defence experts. An annual competition, the CDF Essay Competition, is organised by Pointer. Contributors are invited to submit essays on a given topic; the top three essays are published.
