= Tartan track =

Synthetic surface for track and field events

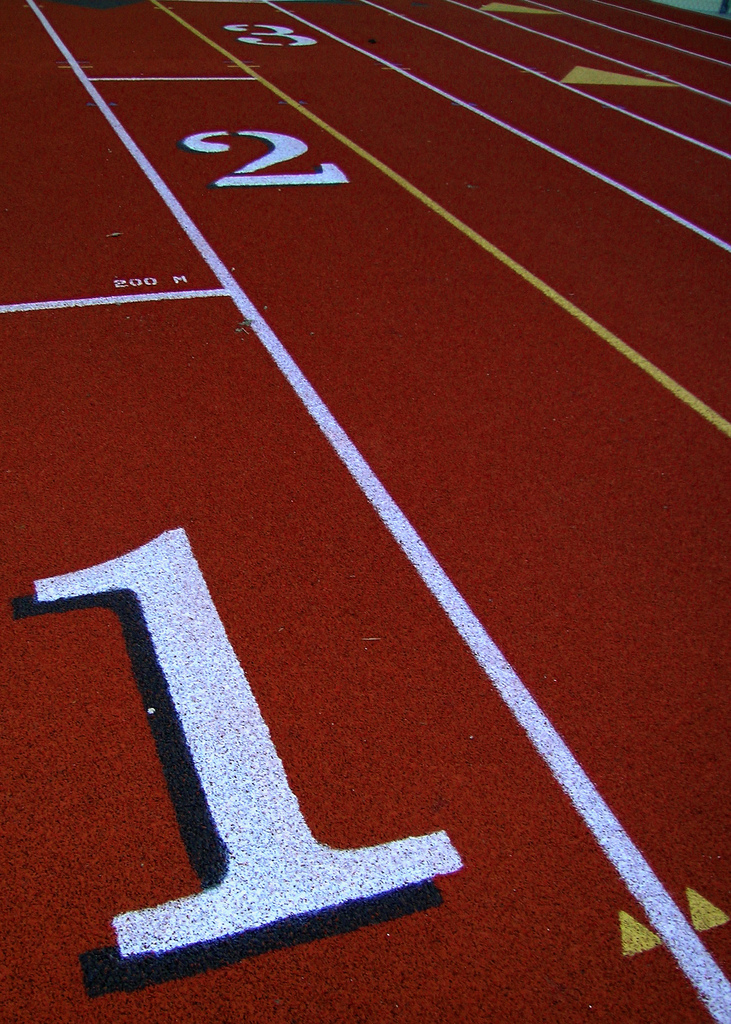
Starting places on Tartan track

Tartan track is a trademarked all-weather synthetic track surfacing made of polyurethane used for track and field competitions, manufactured by 3M. The original production was in 1967, and the product was later reformulated to eliminate the use of mercury.

Because the "Tartan" product was widely successful in its time, the name Tartan has been used as a genericized trademark for description of an all-weather running track.

Athletic Polymer Systems, a subsidiary of MCP Industries, Inc., manages the installation of Tartan-branded running track.

== History ==
According to Minnesota Mining and Manufacturing (3M), developed its "Tartan" track and turf products in the late 1950s, and Sports Illustrated called its development a breakthrough in 1963. The track product was made for running and horseracing tracks and the turf was made for stadiums. These were the first man made track and turf for athletics. Tartan track was tested for use at a track and field competition in the Los Angeles Coliseum as early as 1959.

The first recorded use of a Tartan Track surface in competition in England was a long jump at the Norman Green Sports Centre in Solihull, September 16, 1967, though there were earlier uses in the United States.

The 1968 Summer Olympics at Mexico City was the first Olympic Games to use the Tartan track surface in athletics. Olympic shot put champion Bill Nieder and American record holder in the mile Don Bowden were instrumental in developing the product and selling it for use in the 1968 Olympics.

American track and field coach Bert Bonanno, who had been recruited by the Mexican Olympic Committee to help prepare their athletes, worked as a liaison between the Mexican officials and manufacturer 3M in 1968. "It had been red cinder at the Olympic Games up until then. 3M hired Jesse Owens to assist them to convince the Mexican Olympic Committee to put that track in," Bonanno said.

A Tartan track was constructed for the men's U.S. Olympic Trials at Echo Summit, California, west of South Lake Tahoe. Just off U.S. Route 50, it was built in the summer of 1968 in the parking lot of Nebelhorn ski area, at an elevation of 7,377 feet (2,249 m).

The original trade name "Tartan" came from 3M, manufacturers of Scotch Tape and alluding to the Scotch name. 3M's first generation artificial turf of the late 1960s and early 1970s was branded as "Tartan Turf". Those original tracks used mercury as a catalyst, which is an environmental hazard. An independent company (MCP Industries Inc.) assisted 3M in reformulating the production process to stop using mercury.

Virtually all major horseracing tracks used Tartan track, and Tartan turf was used at most sports arenas and stadiums for high school, college and professional sports.

The patents held by 3M on the product technology began expiring in the 1970s, and the durability of the product meant there was little replacement business. As a result, the value of the product line to the company fell. There are now numerous competitors in the all-weather track industry. In fact, the "Tartan" tracks of the late 1960s were the second generation of all-weather track surfacing. Before that, there were several tracks constructed of rubber (usually tire shavings) and asphalt.
