= Andre Phillips =

American hurdler (born 1959)

André Phillips
Personal information
- Full name: André Lamar Phillips
- Born: September 5, 1959 (age 66) Milwaukee, Wisconsin, U.S.
Medal record
Men's athletics
Representing the United States
Olympic Games
Gold medal – first place	1988 Seoul	400 m hurdles
Athletics World Cup
Gold medal – first place	1985 Canberra	400 hurdles
Gold medal – first place	1985 Canberra	4 × 400 m relay

André Lamar Phillips (born September 5, 1959) is a retired American track and field athlete who is best known for winning the 400 metres hurdles gold medal at the 1988 Olympic Games.

Phillips spent most of his career in the shadow of his idol, Edwin Moses, frequently as runner up during Moses' unequaled winning streak. He managed to beat him once, at the 1988 Olympic Games in Seoul. In 1983, Phillips finished fifth in the 400 m hurdles at the inaugural World Athletics Championships. In 1985, in absence of Moses, Phillips won his only US National Championship title, and also won the IAAF World Cup. In 1988, Phillips lost to Moses at the Olympic trials, but showed a good pace at Olympics, winning his heat and semifinal. In the final, Phillips ran his personal best 47.19 to win a gold medal, beating second-place Amadou Dia Ba from Senegal by 0.04 seconds. At the time he was the second fastest individual over the hurdles. The two times currently still rank them as the #10 and #11 performers of all time. Although Moses ran his fastest Olympic final, he finished only third in a time of 47.56. It was the final race of Moses' career.

In 2009, Phillips was inducted into the National Track and Field Hall of Fame.

Phillips accepted a scholarship for the UCLA Bruins track and field team, but chose to defer it by two years to run for San Jose City College first.

Phillips attended at University of California, Los Angeles, and won the 400 m hurdles at the NCAA championships in 1981. Prior to that, he attended Quimby Oak Jr. High and Silver Creek High School in San Jose, California, where he won the CIF California State Meet in the 330-yard low hurdles in 1977. in 36.43, which also remains the school record for the event at Silver Creek High School. He joins 1976 4 × 100 meter relay Gold medalist, and individual 200 meters Silver medalist Millard Hampton, in one of the rare instances (the school claims only eight exist) of two unrelated Olympic Gold Medalists coming from the same high school. Silver Creek continues to host the "Hampton Phillips Classic" named in their honor.

Phillips is a former teacher at Stagg High School, a former Assistant Principal at Franklin High School, and is now the current Principal at Stagg High School in Stockton, California. Phillips earned his educational doctorate (Ed.D.) at Concordia University Irvine.

Sporting positions
Preceded by (United States) Edwin Moses	Men's 400 m Hurdles Best Year Performance; 1988	Succeeded by (United States) Kevin Young
