= Silver Creek High School (California) =

Location
- 3434 Silver Creek Road; San Jose, California; United States; 37.30389°N 121.80713°W

Information
- Type: Public high school
- Motto: We lead, others follow.
- Established: 1969
- School district: East Side Union High School District
- Principal: Anne Tran
- Teaching staff: 90.32 (FTE)
- Grades: 9–12
- Gender: Female & Male
- Enrollment: 2,139 (2024–2025)
- Student to teacher ratio: 23.68
- Campus type: Suburban
- Colors: Silver, Orange, Black, and White
- Mascot: Raider
- Yearbook: SC Galleon
- Website: silvercreekhigh.esuhsd.org

Silver Creek High School is a high school located in the Evergreen district of San Jose, California, United States, which is operated by the East Side Union High School District. It is a California Distinguished School.

== Demographics ==
As of 2022-23, the school enrolls 2,315 students. The population is 1.3% African American, 0.4% American Indian or Alaska Native, 51.8% Asian, 8.1% Filipino, 31.6% Hispanic or Latino, 0.4% Pacific Islander, 3.8% White, and 2.5% Two or More Races.

== Notable alumni ==
- Boris Bandov (1971): Former professional soccer player for the San Jose Earthquakes.
- Eldon Regua (1973): Major General, United States Army Reserve; currently serving as Deputy Commanding General of the US Eighth Army in Yongsan, Korea; previously served as Commanding General of the 75th Division (Training).
- Millard Hampton (1974): Competed in the 1976 Montreal Olympics, winning a gold medal in the 4 × 100 m relay and a silver medal in the 200 m.
- Andre Phillips (1977): Gold medalist in the 400-meter hurdles at the 1988 Olympic Games.
- Anthony Telford (1984): SJSU All-American, drafted in 1987 by the Baltimore Orioles; played in Major League Baseball until 2002.
- Pellom McDaniels (1986): Professional football player for ten seasons with the Birmingham Fire (World League of American Football, 1991–92), Kansas City Chiefs (1992–1998), and Atlanta Falcons (1999–2000).

== See also ==
- Santa Clara County high schools
