= 1993 World Championships in Athletics – Men's 400 metres hurdles =

These are the official results of the Men's 400 metres Hurdles event at the 1993 IAAF World Championships in Stuttgart, Germany. There were a total of 49 participating athletes, with seven qualifying heats, three semi-finals and the final held on Thursday 1993-08-19.

== Final ==
RANK	FINAL	TIME
	Kevin Young (USA)	47.18 CR
	Samuel Matete (ZAM)	47.60
	Winthrop Graham (JAM)	47.62
4.	Stéphane Diagana (FRA)	47.64
5.	Erick Keter (KEN)	48.40
6.	Oleh Tverdokhlib (UKR)	48.72
7.	Derrick Adkins (USA)	49.07
8.	Barnabas Kinyor (KEN)	49.23

== Semi-finals ==
- Held on Tuesday 1993-08-17

RANK	HEAT 1	TIME
1.	Winthrop Graham (JAM)	48.09
2.	Derrick Adkins (USA)	48.51
3.	Oleh Tverdokhlib (UKR)	48.62
4.	Barnabas Kinyor (KEN)	49.06
5.	Sven Nylander (SWE)	49.21
6.	Dries Vorster (RSA)	49.52
7.	Gary Cadogan (GBR)	49.59
8.	Hidekazu Katsuki (JPN)	49.72

RANK	HEAT 2	TIME
1.	Samuel Matete (ZAM)	48.18
2.	Erick Keter (KEN)	48.24
3.	Fabrizio Mori (ITA)	49.23
4.	José Pérez (CUB)	49.34
5.	Yoshihiko Saito (JPN)	49.43
6.	Marc Dollendorf (BEL)	49.93
7.	Olaf Hense (GER)	50.05
8.	Niklas Wallenlind (SWE)	50.46

RANK	HEAT 3	TIME
1.	Kevin Young (USA)	47.99
2.	Stéphane Diagana (FRA)	48.50
3.	Giorgio Frinolli (ITA)	49.22
4.	Shunji Karube (JPN)	49.31
5.	Rohan Robinson (AUS)	49.36
6.	Gideon Biwott (KEN)	49.42
7.	Domingo Cordero (PUR)	49.62
8.	Miro Kocuvan (SLO)	49.71

== Qualifying heats ==
- Held on Sunday 1993-08-16

RANK	HEAT 1 — 11.30h	TIME
1.	Samuel Matete (ZAM)	48.49
2.	Domingo Cordero (PUR)	49.55
3.	Yoshihiko Saito (JPN)	49.69
4.	Dries Vorster (RSA)	49.82
5.	Jean-Paul Bruwier (BEL)	50.05
6.	Jozef Kucej (SVK)	50.18
7.	Costas Pochanis (CYP)	50.77

RANK	HEAT 2 — 11.38h	TIME
1.	Erick Keter (KEN)	49.39
2.	Olaf Hense (GER)	49.64
3.	Hidekazu Katsuki (JPN)	49.72
4.	Miro Kocuvan (SLO)	49.73
5.	Juan Vallin (MEX)	50.90
6.	Mark Thompson (JAM)	51.04
7.	Alex Foster (CRC)	53.13

RANK	HEAT 3 — 11.46h	TIME
1.	Stéphane Diagana (FRA)	48.90
2.	Gary Cadogan (GBR)	49.25
3.	Rohan Robinson (AUS)	49.49
4.	Pedro Rodrigues (POR)	50.07
5.	Eronilde de Araujo (BRA)	50.81
6.	Mark Jackson (CAN)	51.15
—	Jean-Claude Yekpe (BEN)	DNS

RANK	HEAT 4 — 11.54h	TIME
1.	Derrick Adkins (USA)	49.18
2.	Gideon Biwott (KEN)	49.27
3.	Giorgio Frinolli (ITA)	49.42
4.	Dusán Kovács (HUN)	49.96
5.	Aleksey Bazarov (ISR)	50.08
6.	Vadim Zadoynov (MDA)	50.24
7.	Francisco Flores (HON)	53.79

RANK	HEAT 5 — 12.02h	TIME
1.	José Pérez (CUB)	49.74
2.	Oleh Tverdokhlib (UKR)	50.06
3.	Fabrizio Mori (ITA)	50.10
4.	David Patrick (USA)	50.23
5.	Fadhel Khayati (TUN)	50.60
6.	Marek Helinurm (EST)	50.73
7.	Livingstone Roach (SKN)	53.38 (NR)

RANK	HEAT 6 — 12.10h	TIME
1.	Kevin Young (USA)	49.15
2.	Barnabas Kinyor (KEN)	49.39
3.	Shunji Karube (JPN)	49.80
4.	Hamadou Mbaye (SEN)	50.05
5.	Abdelhak Lahlali (MAR)	51.19
6.	Igor Kurochkin (BLR)	51.45
7.	Oscar Pitillas (ESP)	52.15

RANK	HEAT 7 — 12.18h	TIME
1.	Winthrop Graham (JAM)	49.30
2.	Niklas Wallenlind (SWE)	49.68
3.	Sven Nylander (SWE)	49.70
4.	Marc Dollendorf (BEL)	49.90
5.	Hamed Ziad Abou (SYR)	49.96
6.	Vesa-Pekka Pihlavisto (FIN)	51.05
7.	Chanond Keanchan (THA)	51.37

== See also ==
- 1990 Men's European Championships 400m Hurdles (Split)
- 1992 Men's Olympic 400m Hurdles (Barcelona)
- 1994 Men's European Championships 400m Hurdles (Helsinki)
