= National records in the 400 metres hurdles =

The following table is an overview of national records in the 400 metres hurdles.

== Men ==
Country	Time	Athlete	Date	Place	Ref.
Brazil	45.80	Alison dos Santos	27 August 2026	Zurich	
Norway	45.94	Karsten Warholm	3 August 2021	Tokyo	
United States	46.17	Rai Benjamin	3 August 2021	Tokyo	
Qatar	46.98	Abderrahman Samba	30 June 2018	Paris	
Antigua and Barbuda	47.02 (Note: Benjamin represented Antigua officially only until 30 December 2016, when his personal best was 49.82, but did not represent the USA until 3 October 2018.); 49.82	Rai Benjamin	8 June 2018; 10 June 2016	Eugene; Eugene	
British Virgin Islands	47.08	Kyron McMaster	3 August 2021	Tokyo	
Zambia	47.10	Samuel Matete	7 August 1991	Zurich	
Nigeria	47.11	Ezekiel Nathaniel	19 September 2025	Tokyo	
Senegal	47.23	Amadou Dia Bâ	25 September 1988	Seoul	
Dominican Republic	47.25	Félix Sánchez	29 August 2003	Saint-Denis	
Jamaica	47.34	Roshawn Clarke	21 August 2023	Budapest	
France	47.37	Stéphane Diagana	5 July 1995	Lausanne	
Germany	47.48	Harald Schmid	8 September 1982; 1 September 1987	Athens; Rome	
Italy	47.50	Alessandro Sibilio	11 June 2024	Rome	
Saudi Arabia	47.53	Hadi Soua'an Al-Somaily	27 September 2000	Sydney	
South Africa	47.66	L. J. van Zyl	25 February 2011; 31 May 2011	Pretoria; Ostrava	
Trinidad and Tobago	47.69	Jehue Gordon	15 August 2013	Moscow	
Puerto Rico	47.72	Javier Culson	8 May 2010	Ponce	
Kenya	47.78	Boniface Tumuti	18 August 2016	Rio de Janeiro	
Turkey	47.81	Yasmani Copello	9 August 2018; 3 August 2021	Berlin; Tokyo	
Sweden	47.81	Oskar Edlund	12 August 2026	Birmingham	
Uganda	47.82	John Akii-Bua	2 September 1972	Munich	
Great Britain	47.82	Kriss Akabusi	6 August 1992	Barcelona	
Greece	47.82	Periklis Iakovakis	6 May 2006	Osaka	
Estonia	47.82	Rasmus Mägi	14 June 2022	Turku	
Panama	47.84	Bayano Kamani	7 August 2005	Helsinki	
Japan	47.89	Dai Tamesue	10 August 2001	Edmonton	
Belarus	47.92	Aleksandr Vasilyev	17 August 1985	Moscow	
Cuba	47.93	Omar Cisneros	13 August 2013	Moscow	
Ireland	47.97	Thomas Barr	18 August 2016	Rio de Janeiro	
Zimbabwe	48.05	Ken Harnden	29 July 1998	Saint-Denis	
Serbia	48.05	Emir Bekrić	15 August 2013	Moscow	
Russia	48.05	Denis Kudryavtsev	25 August 2015	Beijing	
Ukraine	48.06	Oleh Tverdokhlib	10 August 1994	Helsinki	
Costa Rica	48.11	Gerald Drummond	6 May 2023	San José	
Spain	48.11	Jesús David Delgado	16 June 2026	Ostrava	
Poland	48.12	Marek Plawgo	28 August 2007	Osaka	
Switzerland	48.13	Marcel Schelbert	27 August 1999	Seville	
Bahamas	48.17	Jeffery Gibson	25 August 2015	Beijing	
Canada	48.24	Adam Kunkel	27 July 2007	Rio de Janeiro	
Slovenia	48.25	Matic Ian Guček	8 August 2025	Banská Bystrica	
Czechia	48.27	Jiří Mužík	3 August 1997	Athens	
Australia	48.28	Rohan Robinson	31 July 1996	Atlanta	
Netherlands	48.36	Nick Smidt	2 July 2023	La Chaux-de-Fonds	
Algeria	48.39	Abdelmalik Lahoulou	28 September 2019	Doha	
Morocco	48.44	Saad Hinti	17 May 2025	Lexington	
Hungary	48.45	Dusán Kovács	3 August 1997	Athens	
Kazakhstan	48.46	Yevgeniy Meleshenko	31 August 2001	Beijing	
Bulgaria	48.48	Toma Tomov	11 August 1986	Budapest	
El Salvador	48.56	Pablo Andrés Ibáñez	6 May 2023	San José	
Moldova	48.61	Vadim Zadoinov	29 August 1990	Split	
Finland	48.61	Antti Sainio	19 July 2025	Bergen	
Chinese Taipei	48.62	Peng Ming-yang	4 August 2023	Chengdu	
Uruguay	48.65	Andrés Silva	2 August 2014	São Paulo	
Belgium	48.66	Julien Watrin	2 September 2022	Brussels	
China	48.68	Gong Debin	17 November 2025	Guangzhou	
China	48.68	Xu Xinfeng	11 July 2026	Ordos	
Tunisia	48.75	Mohamed Adoini	16 May 2026	Auburn	
Botswana	48.76	Kemorena Tisang	18 May 2024	Gaborone	
Portugal	48.77	Pedro Rodrígues; Carlos Silva	10 August 1994; 11 August 1999	Helsinki; Zurich	
Uzbekistan	48.78	Aleksandr Kharlov	20 June 1983	Moscow	
Barbados	48.79	Rasheeme Griffith	9 May 2024	Gainesville	
India	48.80	Dharun Ayyasamy	16 March 2019	Patiala	
Syria	48.87	Zid Abou Hamed	20 February 1999	Sydney	
Belize	48.88	Jonathan Williams	14 July 2007	San Salvador	
Ivory Coast	48.94	René Mélédjé	13 August 1986	Zurich	
Slovakia	48.94	Jozef Kucej	21 June 1989	Prague	
Lebanon	48.95	Marc Anthony Ibrahim	9 August 2025	Oordegem	
Tajikistan	48.98	Nikolay Ilchenko	18 September 1986	Tashkent	
Philippines	48.98	Eric Cray	23 June 2016	Moratalaz, Madrid	
Mozambique	49.02	Kurt Couto	11 June 2012	Prague	
Sri Lanka	49.03	Ayomal Akalanka Kuda Liyanage	11 July 2026	Ordos	
Namibia	49.05	Willie Smit	17 March 2001; 5 April 2002	Roodepoort; Germiston	
Kuwait	49.13	Bader Abdul Rahman Al-Fulaij	18 May 2002	Hyderabad	
Mali	49.13	Ibrahima Maïga	28 April 2007	Dakar	
Venezuela	49.18	Antonio Smith	14 July 1991	Caracas	
Romania	49.22	Alejandro Argudín-Zaharia	4 September 1997	Antananarivo	
Burkina Faso	49.25	Bienvenu Sawadogo	29 August 2019	Rabat	
Cape Verde	49.26	Jordin Andrade	11 June 2016	Kingston	
Mexico	49.27	Guillermo Campos	11 May 2024	Cuiabá	
Argentina	49.28 A	Guillermo Ruggeri	7 June 2018	Cochabamba	
Bahrain	49.31	Ahmed Hamada	30 September 1986	Seoul	
Austria	49.33	Thomas Futterknecht	30 August 1985	Kobe	
New Zealand	49.33	Cameron French	27 January 2018	Canberra	
Iran	49.33	Mehdi Pirjahan	28 August 2019; 2 October 2020	Lucknow; Tehran	
Kyrgyzstan	49.42	Aleksey Pogorelov	31 May 2008	Bishkek	
Grenada	49.51	Shane Charles	14 May 2006	Eugene	
Madagascar	49.53	Yvon Rakotoarimiandry	23 July 2001	Ottawa	
Liberia	49.55	O'Neil Wright	14 May 2005	Atlanta	
Latvia	49.60	Viktors Lācis	1 June 2001	Eugene	
Chile	49.62 A	Alfredo Sepúlveda	7 June 2018	Cochabamba	
Cyprus	49.66; 49.5 h#	Stavros Tziortzis	2 September 1972; 28 June 1972	Munich; Piraeus	
United Arab Emirates	49.66	Ali Shirook	30 April 2009; 26 July 2009	Qatif; Zeulenroda	
Egypt	49.74	Ahmed Ghanem	12 August 1985	Cairo	
Singapore	49.75	Calvin Quek	20 August 2025	Yokohama	
Thailand	49.76	Chanond Keanchan	12 December 1995	Chiang Mai	
Ecuador	49.76	Emerson Alejandro Chala	28 November 2013	Trujillo	
South Korea	49.80	Hwang Hong-cheol	10 June 1990	Seoul	
Sudan	49.82	Mohamed Shaib	4 July 2017	Castellón	
Seychelles	49.82	Ned Azemia	19 May 2018	El Dorado	
U.S. Virgin Islands	49.83	Leslie Murray	11 June 2009	Fayetteville	
Israel	49.87 (Note: Aleksey Bazarov's personal best of 49.33 of June 1988 is not an Israeli NR as he represented the USRR (Moldova) before 1991.)	Aleksey Bazarov	11 September 1991	Koblenz	
Croatia	49.88	Darko Juričić	18 August 1998	Budapest	
Colombia	49.90; 49.7 h#	Yeison Rivas	19 November 2015; 12 July 2008	Cali; Cali	
Pakistan	49.90	Mohamed Amin	11 October 1994	Hiroshima	
Mauritius	49.94	Gilbert Hashan	29 July 1996	Atlanta	
Iraq	49.95	Talib Faizal Al-Saffar	22 August 1977	Sofia	
Guyana	49.95	Paul Tucker	13 August 2000	La Chaux-de-Fonds	
Haiti	49.99	Alie Beauvais	17 May 2009	Princeton	
Azerbaijan	50.00	Aleksandr Karasyov	30 May 1976	Munich	
Denmark	50.01	Nicolai Hartling	10 August 2019	Varaždin	
Vietnam	50.05	Quách Công Lịch	22 August 2017	Kuala Lumpur	
Guatemala	50.16	Allan Ayala	12 June 2009	Guatemala City	
Libya	50.21	Hamza Deyaf	3 July 2009	Pescara	
Papua New Guinea	50.37	Mowen Boino	21 March 2006	Melbourne	
Lithuania	50.39	Silvestras Guogis	21 July 2012	Jessheim	
Ghana	50.40	Keith Nkrumah	5 May 2012	Greensboro	
Albania	50.46 (Note: Eusebio Haliti's personal best of 49.85 of 28 July 2013 is not an Albanian NR as he represented Italy since 2012.)	Eusebio Haliti	12 June 2011	Naples	
Benin	50.48; 50.0 h#	Abdoualaye Cherif Issa	25 April 2006; 24 April 2007	Ouagadougou; Ouagadougou	
Andorra	50.59	Daniel Gómez	3 September 2000	Barcelona	
Saint Kitts and Nevis	50.65	Sharim Hamilton	25 May 2024	Emporia	
Guinea-Bissau	50.68 (Note: Edivaldo Monteiro's personal best of 49.10 set in June 2004 is not a Guinea-Bissau NR as he represented Portugal after 1999.)	Edivaldo Monteiro	20 June 1998	Lisbon	
Ethiopia	50.71 A 50.5 h#A	Gadisa Bayu; Yobsen Biru	25 May 2018; 1 April 2022	Asella; Hawassa	
Central African Republic	50.77	Lucien Pandjikola	4 July 2008	Marseille	
Armenia	50.79; 50.6 h#	Rudik Matevosian	5 August 1984; 13 July 1985	Moscow; Kaunas	
Guinea	50.81	Amadou Sy Savane	23 May 1998	Atlanta	
Indonesia	50.81	Halomoan Edwin Binsar	10 December 2019	New Clark City	
Bosnia and Herzegovina	50.84	Duško Milutinović	13 August 1989	Serres	
Hong Kong	50.88	Chan Ka Chun	16 April 2016	Walnut	
French Polynesia	50.90	Robert Tupuhoé	11 April 1987	Pīraʻe	
Luxembourg	50.94	Jacques Frisch	30 June 2013	Chambéry	
Iceland	51.17	Bjorgvin Vikingsson	24 May 2008	Rehlingen	
Tanzania	51.20	Morris Okinda	12 August 1985	Cairo	
Chad	51.23	Ali Faudet	24 June 1994	Besançon	
Cayman Islands	51.23	Junior Hines	25 May 2012	Marion	
Malaysia	51.26	Muhammad Fakhrul Afizur	6 June 2023	Yeocheon City	
Georgia	51.40	Arkadiy Bronnikov	18 May 1986	Sochi	
Oman	51.54	Abdullah Said Al-Haidi	20 September 2010	Aleppo	
Fiji	51.67	Jovesa Naivalu	9 June 1999	Santa Rita	
Saint Vincent	51.70	Fitz-Allen Crick	19 July 2003	Bloomington	
Dominica	51.74	Dennick Luke	10 February 2024	Spanish Town	
Comoros	51.79	Maoulida Darouèche	6 July 2013	Aubagne	
Cameroon	51.80; 51.89	Emmanuel Youmékoué	23 July 2005; 24 July 2005	Yaoundé	
Bangladesh	51.87	Abdur Rahim Nayeem	25 December 1993	Dhaka	
Congo Republic	51.87	Emmanuel Tamba Elenga	22 June 2024	Douala	
Turkmenistan	51.89	Oleg Podmaryov	18 September 1986	Tashkent	
Angola	51.95	Wilson André	28 July 1995	Lisbon	
Tonga	52.02	Paeaki Kokohu	5 May 1996	Sacramento	
Myanmar	52.07	Htay Win	2 December 1991	Manila	
San Marino	52.12	Andrea Ercolani Volta	3 June 2023	Marsa	
Sierra Leone	52.18	Benjamin Grant	31 May 1992	Birmingham	
Peru	52.20	Mauro Mina	1 November 1992	Lima	
Niger	52.33	Nasser Dan Matta	13 December 2005	Niamey	
North Macedonia	52.33	Jovan Stojoski	19 June 2024	Maribor	
Saint Lucia	52.45	Alva Henry	6 May 2018	Kearny	
Paraguay	52.78 A	Francisco Rojas Soto	13 October 1975	Mexico City	
Vanuatu	52.94	David Benjimen	21 June 2011	Apia	
Bermuda	53.03	Clarence Saunders	24 June 1994	Dedham	
Nepal	53.23	Asha Ram Chaudhari	25 December 1993	Dhaka	
Togo	53.27	Lankantien Lamboni	18 May 2013	Bamako	
North Korea	53.30	Choi Chang-Sun	2 June 1985	Sofia	
Yemen	53.34	Nasim Ahmed Mansour	16 April 2016	Manama	
Aruba	53.49	Freddy Burgos	9 June 1984	Leiden	
Jordan	53.62	Hassan Abou Najem	27 September 1993	Latakia	
São Tomé and Príncipe	53.69	Arlindo Pinheiro	21 July 2001	Lisbon	
Burundi	53.99	Christophe Bigirimana	23 September 1991	Cairo	
Mongolia	54.00	Tsendsuren Erdene-Munkh	20 June 1990	Bratislava	
South Sudan	54.08	Joseph Akoon	26 July 2020	Maebashi	
Montenegro	54.17	Milan Vuković	28 June 1998	Belgrade	
Afghanistan	54.19	Said Gilani	10 June 2017	Göttingen	
Rwanda	54.36	Faustin Butéra	3 August 1984	Los Angeles	
Samoa	54.46	Kuripitone Betham	14 December 2002	Christchurch	
Malta	54.53	Jordan Pace	29 May 2025	Andorra la Vella	
Congo DR	54.55	Tino Ngoy	22 April 2005	Ypsilanti	
Laos	54.59	Anousone Xaysa	1 December 2022	Phonsavan	
Brunei	54.64	Kaderi Bujang	30 November 1993	Manila	
Lesotho	54.65	Relebohile Mosito	20 March 2010	Durban	
Gambia	54.66	Demba Sanyang	5 September 2020	Madrid	
Bolivia	54.71	Ignacio Novarro	26 May 1995	Manaus	
Nicaragua	54.74	Lenín Vanegas	19 April 2010	Panama City	
Gabon	55.32	Daniel Ololo	22 July 1978	Algiers	

== Women ==
Country	Time	Athlete	Date	Place	Ref.
United States	50.37	Sydney McLaughlin-Levrone	8 August 2024	Paris	
Netherlands	50.95	Femke Bol	14 July 2024	La Chaux-de-Fonds	
Slovakia	52.30	Emma Zapletalová	19 June 2026	Doha	
Russia	52.34	Yuliya Pechonkina	8 August 2003	Tula	
Jamaica	52.42	Melaine Walker	20 August 2009	Berlin	
Canada	52.46	Savannah Sutherland	15 June 2025	Eugene	
Panama	52.66	Gianna Woodruff	17 September 2025	Tokyo	
Great Britain	52.74	Sally Gunnell	19 August 1993	Stuttgart	
Greece	52.77	Fani Chalkia	22 August 2004	Athens	
Czechia	52.83	Zuzana Hejnová	15 August 2013	Moscow	
Cuba	52.89	Daimí Pernía	25 August 1999	Seville	
Morocco	52.90	Nezha Bidouane	25 August 1999	Seville	
Ukraine	52.96	Anna Ryzhykova	4 July 2021	Stockholm	
Bahrain	53.09	Kemi Adekoya	24 August 2023	Budapest	
Belarus	53.11	Tatyana Ledovskaya	29 August 1991	Tokyo	
Australia	53.17	Debbie Flintoff-King	28 September 1988	Seoul	
Trinidad and Tobago	53.20	Josanne Lucas	20 August 2009	Berlin	
Belgium	53.20	Paulien Couckuyt	4 September 2026	Brussels	
France	53.21	Marie-José Pérec	16 August 1995	Zurich	
Germany	53.24	Sabine Busch	21 August 1987	Potsdam	
Romania	53.25	Ionela Târlea	7 July 1999	Rome	
Barbados	53.36	Andrea Blackett	25 August 1999	Seville	
Denmark	53.55	Sara Slott Petersen	18 August 2016	Rio de Janeiro	
Bulgaria	53.68	Vanya Stambolova	5 June 2011	Rabat	
South Africa	53.74	Myrtle Bothma	18 April 1986	Johannesburg	
Poland	53.86	Anna Jesień	28 August 2007	Osaka	
Italy	53.89	Ayomide Folorunso	22 August 2023	Budapest	
Norway	53.91	Line Kloster	3 July 2022	La Chaux-de-Fonds	
China	53.96	Han Qing; Song Yinglan	9 September 1993; 17 November 2001	Beijing; Guangzhou	
Lithuania	54.02	Ana Ambrazienė	11 June 1983	Moscow	
Hungary	54.02	Judit Szekeres	23 January 1998	Roodepoort	
Switzerland	54.06	Lea Sprunger	4 October 2019	Doha	
Zimbabwe	54.08	Ashley Miller	6 June 2026	College Station	
Sweden	54.15	Ann-Louise Skoglund	30 August 1986	Stuttgart	
Ireland	54.31	Susan Smith-Walsh	12 August 1998	Zurich	
United Arab Emirates	54.31	Mariam Kareem	28 September 2026	Nagoya	
Spain	54.34	Sara Gallego	25 June 2022	Nerja	
Iceland	54.37	Guðrún Arnardóttir	5 August 2000	Crystal Palace, London	
Nigeria	54.40	Muizat Ajoke Odumosu	6 August 2012	London	
Finland	54.40	Viivi Lehikoinen	6 June 2023	Huelva	
Uzbekistan	54.43; 54.34 (Note: The personal best of Tatyana Zubova (married name: Tatyana Pavlova) is 54.34 but this is not listed as the Uzbeki NR in the World Athletics Statistic Handbook.)	Tatyana Zubova	22 June 1984; 2 August 1985	Kyiv; Leningrad	
Kazakhstan	54.50	Natalya Torshina-Alimzhanova	27 May 2000	Santo António	
Portugal	54.65	Fatoumata Binta Diallo	10 June 2024	Rome	
Senegal	54.75	Mame Tacko Diouf	16 June 1999	Athens	
India	54.75	Vithya Ramraj	28 September 2026	Aichi-Nagoya	
Cyprus	54.76	Androula Sialou	4 July 2004	Heraklion	
Colombia	54.80	Melissa Gonzalez	3 June 2022	Bydgoszcz	
Sudan	54.93	Muna Jabir Adam	22 July 2007	Algiers	
Puerto Rico	55.03	Yvonne Harrison	29 June 2003	Poznań	
Turkey	55.09	Nagihan Karadere	31 July 2011	Ankara	
Cameroon	55.09	Linda Angounou	8 August 2024	Saint-Denis	
Mexico	55.11	Zudikey Rodríguez	31 July 2018	Barranquilla	
Brazil	55.15	Chayenne da Silva	25 June 2021	São Paulo	
Costa Rica	55.15	Daniela Rojas	3 August 2026	Santo Domingo	
Vietnam	55.30	Quách Thị Lan	27 August 2018	Jakarta	
Japan	55.34	Satomi Kubokura	26 June 2011	Osaka	
New Zealand	55.44	Portia Bing	5 March 2022	Hastings	
Latvia	55.46	Lana Jēkabsone	9 June 1996	Tallinn	
Burkina Faso	55.49	Aïssata Soulama	22 July 2007	Algiers	
Liberia	55.55	Kou Luogon	1 May 2009	Baie-Mahault	
Turks and Caicos	55.58	Yanique Haye-Smith	8 June 2019	Montverde	
Bahamas	55.69	Katrina Seymour	10 April 2018	Gold Coast	
Chinese Taipei	55.71	Hsu Pei-chin	17 December 1998	Bangkok	
Philippines	55.72	Lauren Hoffman	27 April 2024	Des Moines	
Kenya	55.7 hA; 55.84	Rose Tata-Muya; Francisca Koki Manunga	13 August 1988; 14 August 2014	Nairobi; Marrakesh	
Argentina	55.88	Fiorella Chiappe	8 July 2018	Brussels	
Austria	55.94	Lena Pressler	16 July 2023	Espoo	
Slovenia	55.96	Agata Zupin	23 July 2017	Grosseto	
U.S. Virgin Islands	55.96	Michelle Smith	31 May 2024	Atlanta	
Estonia	56.00	Viola Hambidge	18 July 2026	Lappeenranta	
Croatia	56.01	Natalija Švenda	9 August 2025	Oordegem	
Malaysia	56.02	Noraseela Mohd Khalid	17 June 2006	Regensburg	
Israel	56.09 (Note: Irina Lenskiy emigrated from Ukraine to Israel in 1999, so personal best time of 55.43 run in 1996 is not the Israeli record)	Irina Lenskiy	18 June 2000	Kyiv	
Moldova	56.11	Natalia Dudina	5 July 1988	Tallinn	
Kyrgyzstan	56.16	Galina Pedan	15 July 2004	Almaty	
Thailand	56.25	Reawadee Watanasin	12 October 1994	Hiroshima	
Uruguay	56.30	Déborah Rodríguez	23 August 2015	Beijing	
Saint Kitts and Nevis	56.31	Reanda Richards	24 May 2019	Jacksonville	
Ivory Coast	56.39	Marie Womplou	12 July 1994	Bondoufle	
Sri Lanka	56.45	Christine Sonali Merrill	8 June 2013	Chula Vista	
Albania	56.48	Klodiana Shala	29 June 2005; 30 June 2005	Almería; Almería	
Madagascar	56.49	Cendrino Razaiarimalala	1 July 2001	Saint-Étienne	
Ecuador	56.50	Lucy Jaramillo	23 June 2012	Cali	
Venezuela	56.65	Magdalena Mendoza	13 June 2015	Lima	
Algeria	56.66	Houria Moussa	22 June 2006	Algiers	
Benin	56.66	Bimbo Miel Ayedou	24 July 2011	Ouagadougou	
Haiti	56.87	Jessica Gelibert	29 May 2014	Jacksonville	
Syria	56.89	Ghofrane Al-Mohamed	5 July 2016	Almaty	
Uganda	57.02	Ruth Kyalisima	6 August 1984	Los Angeles	
Dominican Republic	57.08 A	Yolanda Osana	26 October 2011	Guadalajara	
British Virgin Islands	57.21	Lakeisha Warner	24 May 2019	Jacksonville	
Gambia	57.24 (Note: Nusrat Ceesay transferred from Britain to Gambia on 31 May 2011, so her personal best of 57.13 in Birmingham in July 2009 is not a Gambian NR.)	Nusrat Ceesay	20 April 2012	Azusa	
Sierra Leone	57.25	Aisha Naibe-Wey	15 June 2018	Ried im Innkreis	
South Korea	57.34	Jo Eun-ju	3 May 2013	Ansan	
Belize	57.43	Lydia Troupe	23 May 2024	Lexington	
North Macedonia	57.53	Drita Islami	19 June 2021	Limassol	
Chile	57.53	Violeta Arnaiz	30 June 2024	Brussels	
Serbia	57.55	Mila Andrić	26 July 2009	Novi Sad	
Ethiopia	57.60 A	Zewde Hailemariam	9 May 2019	Nairobi	
Saint Vincent	57.62	Odeshia Nanton	25 May 2024	Emporia	
Tunisia	57.69	Hend Kebaoui	28 July 1995	Lindau	
Botswana	57.96	Oarabile Babolayi	30 August 2019	Rabat	
Comoros	57.97	Salhate Djamalidine	26 July 2003	Narbonne	
Armenia	57.97; 56.15 (Note: Questionable. No other 400 m hurdles result of Harutyunyan is known below 1:03.13, which she ran a few weeks later at the Olympic Games)	Amaliya Sharoyan; Lilit Harutyunyan	12 August 2013; 29 May 2016	Moscow; Artashat	
Papua New Guinea	58.02	Betty Burua	29 March 2015	Brisbane	
Peru	58.04	Kimberly Cardoza	6 August 2019	Lima	
Zambia	58.07 (Note: American-born Busiwa Asinga's ran her personal best of 58.07 in 2021 when she represented Zambia, her mother Ngozi Mwanamwambwa's birth country and the place she grew up. From May 2023, she and her brother Issam Asinga have competed for Suriname, her father Tommy Asinga's birth country.)	Busiwa Asinga	30 April 2021	Normal, IL	
Georgia	58.20	Zhorena Onyashvili	11 June 1983	Moscow	
El Salvador	58.29	Veronica Quijano	4 December 2002	San Salvador	
Guyana	58.29	Andrea Foster	23 April 2022	Columbia	
Angola	58.34	Delfina Joaquim	11 July 1999	Lisbon	
Montenegro	58.36	Sanja Tripković	28 June 1998	Belgrade	
Grenada	58.37	Kishara George	29 May 2004	Baton Rouge	
Turkmenistan	58.47	Merjen Ishankuliyeva	14 June 2009	Almaty	
Tajikistan	58.47	Kristina Pronzhenko	12 June 2019	Tashkent	
Luxembourg	58.54	Uyana Granger	6 August 2026	Eugene	
Vanuatu	58.68	Mary Estelle Kapalu	28 July 1996	Atlanta	
Namibia	58.68	Lilianne Klaasman	17 September 2015	Brazzaville	
Iran	58.86	Nazanin Fatemeh	26 April 2024	Dubai	
Singapore	58.93	Dipna Lim Prasad	26 August 2018	Jakarta	
Bosnia and Herzegovina	58.99	Gorana Cvijetić	4 July 2007	Sofia	
Bermuda	59.03	Shianne Smith	10 June 2016	Colmar	
Congo Republic	59.03	Flora Kouvoutoukila	25 June 2024	Douala	
Ghana	59.13	Ruky Abdulai	4 June 2006	Abbotsford	
Samoa	59.27	Kim Peterson	20 January 1990	Auckland	
Myanmar	59.38	Cherry	13 September 2001	Kuala Lumpur	
French Polynesia	59.42	Katia Sanford	9 July 1989	Créteil	
Lebanon	59.57	Rasha Badrani	23 May 2024	Emporia	
Andorra	59.60	Duna Viñals	8 August 2025	Tampere	
Indonesia	59.64	Melissa Hetharie Viera	14 November 2011	Palembang	
Guatemala	59.79	Larissa Soto Midena	26 July 1991	Xalapa	
Bolivia	1:00.06 A	Alison Mariana Sánchez Delfin	20 May 2012	Sucre	
Mauritius	1:00.08	Sandra Govinden	27 June 1992	Belle Vue Harel	
Iraq	1:00.15	Dina Saadoun	15 November 1989	New Delhi	
Pakistan	1:00.35 A	Najma Parveen	6 December 2019	Kathmandu	
Monaco	1:00.51	Marie-Charlotte Gastaud	5 July 2024	Cannes	
Saint Lucia	1:00.62	Kassandra Pierre	14 May 2015	High Point, NC	
Azerbaijan	1:00.66	Tatyana Averiyanova	18 September 1986	Tashkent	
Hong Kong	1:00.75	Ma Ying Wen Ashleigh	10 May 2026	Wan Chai	
Suriname	1:00.78	Busiwa Asinga	14 May 2023	Normal, IL	
Mali	1:00.90	Oumou Keïta	15 July 2012	Reims	
Egypt	1:01.00	Malak Ahmed Fathy	30 June 2024	Ismailia	
Fiji	1:01.01	Ana Kaloucava	19 July 2019	Apia	
Togo	1:01.0 h	Sandrine Thiébaud-Kangni	19 May 2002	Saint-Étienne	
Cape Verde	1:01.19	Neuza Reis	7 July 2013	Fátima	
Nicaragua	1:01.31	Ariana Rivera	24 June 2018	Greensboro	
São Tomé and Príncipe	1:01.36	Inicia Fonseca Coelho	1 July 1997	Mataró	
North Korea	1:01.39	Kim Ji-Ok	25 November 1982	New Delhi	
Libya	1:01.54	Najla Aqdeir Ali Salem	14 June 2015	Rieti	
Jordan	1:01.72	Aliya Boshnak	24 April 2026	Limassol	
Paraguay	1:01.89	Fatima Amarilla	24 June 2017	Asunción	
San Marino	1:01.96	Beatrice Berti	8 July 2023	Modena	
Guinea-Bissau	1:02.09	Graciela Martins	25 January 2014	Bambolim	
Antigua and Barbuda	1:02.21	Barbara Selkridge	6 August 1988	Syracuse	
Mozambique	1:02.34	Cecilia Guambe	2 June 2024	Maputo	
Seychelles	1:02.55	Mirenda Francourt	16 September 1992	Seoul	
Central African Republic	1:03.14	Mireille Bara’ang	7 July 1991	Dreux	
Saudi Arabia	1:03.96	Deemah Al-Megbel	5 July 2026	Coquitlam	
Guam	1:04.00	Christina Francisco	30 April 2016	Corvallis	
Liechtenstein	1:04.08	Claudia Fantina	6 September 1992	Colombier	
Mongolia	1:04.0 hA	Baatar Hurelceceg	22 August 1984	Ulaanbaatar	
Malawi	1:04.26	Ambwene Simukonda	5 June 2011	Swansea	
