= Athletics at the 1992 Summer Olympics – Men's 400 metres hurdles =

Men's 400 metres hurdles at the Games of the XXV Olympiad
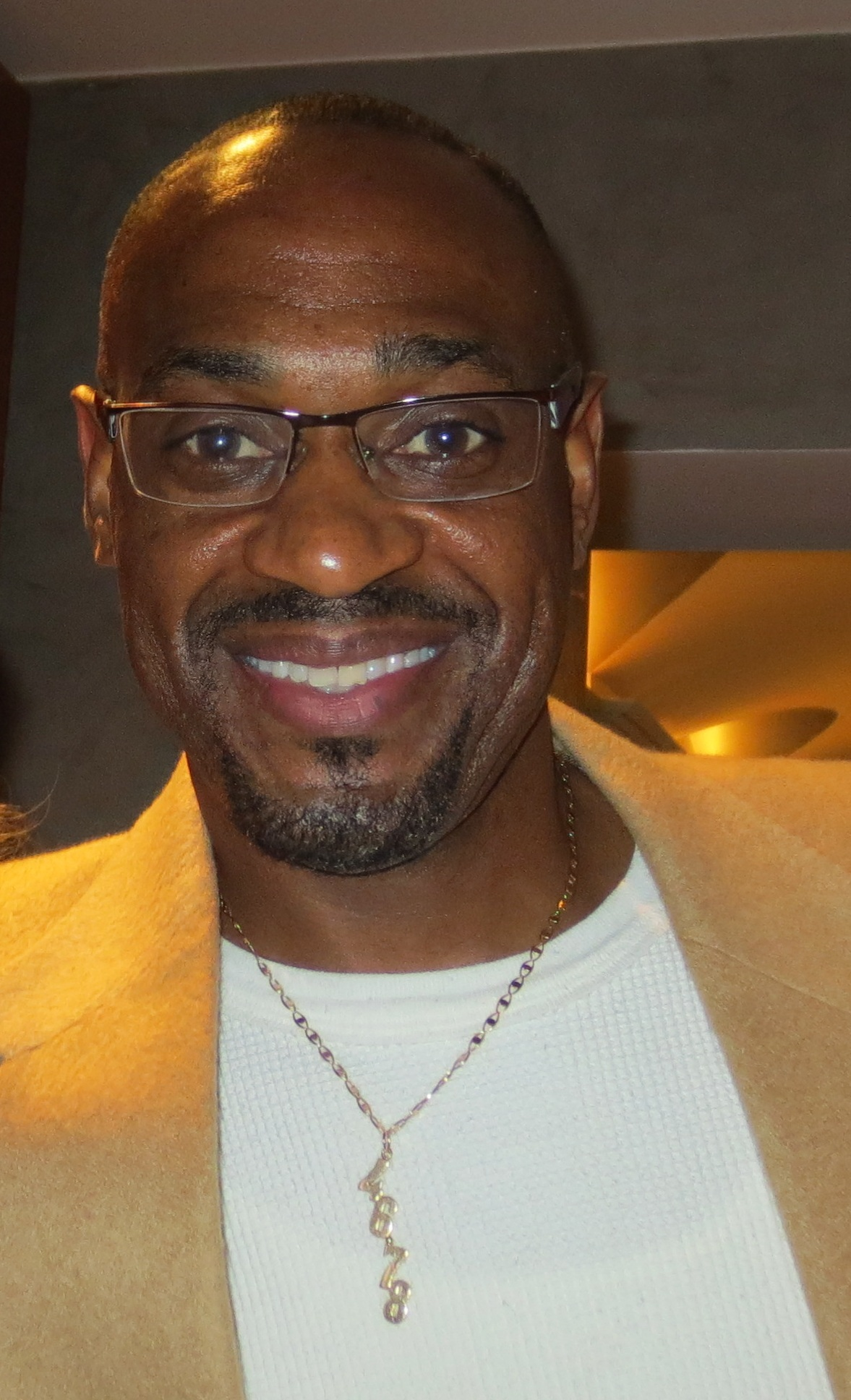
- Kevin Young (2012)
- Venue: Estadi Olímpic Lluís Companys
- Dates: 3 August 1992 (quarterfinals); 5 August 1992 (semifinals); 6 August 1992 (final)
- Competitors: 47 from 35 nations
- Winning time: 46.78 WR

Medalists
1st place, gold medalist(s)		Kevin Young; United States
2nd place, silver medalist(s)		Winthrop Graham; Jamaica
3rd place, bronze medalist(s)		Kriss Akabusi; Great Britain

Official Video Highlights @ 1:00

The men's 400 metres hurdles was an event at the 1992 Summer Olympics in Barcelona, Spain. It was held from 3 to 6 August at the Estadi Olímpic Lluís Companys. There were 47 competitors from 35 nations. The maximum number of athletes per nation had been set at 3 since the 1930 Olympic Congress. The event was won by Kevin Young of the United States, the nation's third consecutive and 15th overall victory in the event. Winthrop Graham earned Jamaica's first men's 400 metres hurdles medal with his silver. Kriss Akabusi earned bronze, putting Great Britain on the podium in the event for the first time since 1980. The three medalists had finished in the same order in 1988, just outside of the medals that year in fourth through sixth places.

== Background ==
This was the 20th time the event was held. It had been introduced along with the men's 200 metres hurdles in 1900, with the 200 being dropped after 1904 and the 400 being held through 1908 before being left off the 1912 programme. However, when the Olympics returned in 1920 after World War I, the men's 400 metres hurdles was back and would continue to be contested at every Games thereafter.

Four of the eight finalists from the 1988 Games returned: silver medalist Amadou Dia Ba of Senegal, fourth-place finisher Kevin Young of the United States, fifth-place finisher Winthrop Graham of Jamaica, and sixth-place finisher Kriss Akabusi of Great Britain. Two of the great long hurdlers, American Edwin Moses and West German Harald Schmid, had retired. The reigning world champion, and favorite in Barcelona, was Samuel Matete of Zambia. Graham and Akabusi had finished behind Matete at the world championships and were also strong contenders.

The Central African Republic, Costa Rica, Guam, Guinea, Israel, Papua New Guinea, Thailand, and Tonga each made their debut in the event; some former Soviet republics competed as the Unified Team. The United States made its 19th appearance, most of any nation, having missed only the boycotted 1980 Games.

== Summary ==
Running in lane 4, Kevin Young appeared to have the slowest reaction to the gun of the field. To his inside, Graham was the first over the first hurdle. Using a left leg lead, 13 strides to the second hurdle, Young had pulled to just slightly behind Graham. Between the next two hurdles he ran 12 strides, alternating to the right leg lead over the fourth hurdle. Over the fifth hurdle he had made up the stagger on Kriss Akabusi to his outside. Relative to the hurdles, he had clearly passed Graham with the rest of the field clearly a full stride or more behind. Running 13 strides the rest of the way, he passed the rest of the competitors to his outside between the next two hurdles. A one stride lead over Graham at the eight hurdle became two by the ninth. Young was still powerful as Graham was struggling. In the battle for bronze, Stéphane Diagana had a slight lead over Akabusi over the eighth hurdle, but Akabusi clearly broke away between eight and nine, which Diagana struggled to clear. Young tried to maintain his power into the final hurdle though he came up a little short, catching the face of the hurdle with his lead leg heel, riding the hurdle to the ground. He maintained his powerful stride to the finish. Realizing he had the clear victory, Young raised his right arm in celebration 10 meters before the finish, slowing his last four strides. Still, Young crossed the finish line with a new world record, taking almost a quarter of a second out of Edwin Moses' nine-year-old record. Graham held on for second, as Akabusi was unable to make up the gap with Diagana unable to recover the distance he had lost to Akabusi.

== Competition format ==
The competition used the three-round format used every Games since 1908 (except the four-round competition in 1952): quarterfinals, semifinals, and a final. Ten sets of hurdles were set on the course. The hurdles were 3 feet (91.5 centimetres) tall and were placed 35 metres apart beginning 45 metres from the starting line, resulting in a 40 metres home stretch after the last hurdle. The 400 metres track was standard.

There were 7 quarterfinal heats with 7 athletes each (before two withdrawals left one heat with only 5). The top 2 men in each quarterfinal advanced to the semifinals along with the next fastest 2 overall. The 16 semifinalists were divided into 2 semifinals of 8 athletes each, with the top 4 in each semifinal advancing to the 8-man final.

== Records ==
These were the standing world and Olympic records (in seconds) prior to the 1992 Summer Olympics.

World record	Edwin Moses (USA)	47.02	Koblenz, West Germany	31 August 1983
Olympic record	Andre Phillips (USA)	47.19	Seoul, South Korea	25 September 1988

In the final, Kevin Young set a new world record with 46.78.

== Schedule ==
All times are Central European Summer Time (UTC+2)

Date	Time	Round
Monday, 3 August 1992	12:15	Quarterfinals
Wednesday, 5 August 1992	19:15	Semifinals
Thursday, 6 August 1992	19:00	Final

== Results ==
=== Quarterfinals ===
==== Quarterfinal 1 ====
Rank	Athlete	Nation	Time	Notes
1	Kevin Young	United States	48.76	Q
2	Stéphane Caristan	France	49.16	Q
3	Gideon Yego	Kenya	49.23	
4	Athanassios Kalogiannis	Greece	49.52	
5	Aleksey Bazarov	Israel	50.33	
6	Jacques-Henri Brunet	Central African Republic	52.59	
7	Abdullah Sabt Ghulam	United Arab Emirates	56.20	

==== Quarterfinal 2 ====
Rank	Athlete	Nation	Time	Notes
1	Samuel Matete	Zambia	49.89	Q
2	Olaf Hense	Germany	49.97	Q
3	Domingo Cordero	Puerto Rico	50.19	
4	Kazuhiko Yamazaki	Japan	50.30	
5	Vadim Zadoynov	Unified Team	51.21	
6	Baobo Neuendorf	Papua New Guinea	53.30	
7	Amadou Sy Savane	Guinea	54.26	

==== Quarterfinal 3 ====
Rank	Athlete	Nation	Time	Notes
1	Erick Keter	Kenya	48.28	Q
2	Stéphane Diagana	France	48.41	Q
3	Oleg Tverdokhleb	Unified Team	48.68	q
4	Mark Jackson	Canada	49.18	
5	Pedro Rodrigues	Portugal	49.46	
6	Ghulam Abbas	Pakistan	50.57	
7	Autiko Daunakamakama	Fiji	53.90	

==== Quarterfinal 4 ====
Rank	Athlete	Nation	Time	Notes
1	McClinton Neal	United States	49.13	Q
2	Carsten Köhrbrück	Germany	49.37	Q
3	Amadou Dia Ba	Senegal	49.47	
4	Andries Vorster	South Africa	49.75	
—	Pedro Chiamulera	Brazil	DNF	
—	Zeid Abou Hamed	Syria	DNS	
—	Fadhel Khayati	Tunisia	DNS	

==== Quarterfinal 5 ====
Rank	Athlete	Nation	Time	Notes
1	Sven Nylander	Sweden	49.49	Q
2	David Patrick	United States	49.56	Q
3	Jozef Kucej	Czechoslovakia	50.28	
4	Hubert Rakotombelontsoa	Madagascar	51.54	
5	Paeaki Kokohu	Tonga	56.99	
—	Max Robertson	Great Britain	DNF	
—	Mark Thompson	Jamaica	DSQ	

==== Quarterfinal 6 ====
Rank	Athlete	Nation	Time	Notes
1	Kriss Akabusi	Great Britain	48.98	Q
2	Eronilde de Araújo	Brazil	49.10	Q
3	Fabrizio Mori	Italy	49.16	
4	Simon Hollingsworth	Australia	49.74	
5	Paweł Woźniak	Poland	50.30	
6	Chanon Keanchan	Thailand	50.60	
7	Richard Bentley	Guam	57.04	

==== Quarterfinal 7 ====
Rank	Athlete	Nation	Time	Notes
1	Winthrop Graham	Jamaica	48.51	Q
2	Niklas Wallenlind	Sweden	48.71	Q
3	Barnabas Kinyor	Kenya	48.90	q
4	Yoshihiko Saito	Japan	49.01	
5	Asen Markov	Bulgaria	50.21	
6	Giovanny Fanny	Seychelles	52.63	
7	Alex Foster	Costa Rica	52.93	

=== Semifinals ===
==== Semifinal 1 ====
Rank	Athlete	Nation	Time	Notes
1	Kriss Akabusi	Great Britain	48.01	Q
2	Stéphane Diagana	France	48.28	Q
3	Niklas Wallenlind	Sweden	48.35	Q
4	David Patrick	United States	48.47	Q
5	McClinton Neal	United States	48.71	
6	Erick Keter	Kenya	49.01	
7	Carsten Köhrbrück	Germany	49.41	
8	Eronilde de Araújo	Brazil	49.66	

==== Semifinal 2 ====
Rank	Athlete	Nation	Time	Notes
1	Winthrop Graham	Jamaica	47.62	Q
2	Kevin Young	United States	47.63	Q
3	Oleh Tverdokhlib	Unified Team	49.11	Q
4	Stéphane Caristan	France	49.50	Q
5	Barnabas Kinyor	Kenya	49.52	
6	Sven Nylander	Sweden	49.64	
—	Samuel Matete	Zambia	DSQ	
—	Olaf Hense	Germany	DNS	

=== Final ===
The final was held on August 6, 1992.

Rank	Athlete	Nation	Time	Notes
1st place, gold medalist(s)	Kevin Young	United States	46.78	WR
2nd place, silver medalist(s)	Winthrop Graham	Jamaica	47.66	
3rd place, bronze medalist(s)	Kriss Akabusi	Great Britain	47.82	
4	Stéphane Diagana	France	48.13	
5	Niklas Wallenlind	Sweden	48.63	
6	Oleh Tverdokhlib	Unified Team	48.63	
7	Stéphane Caristan	France	48.86	
8	David Patrick	United States	49.26	

== Results summary ==
Rank	Athlete	Nation	Quarterfinals	Semifinals	Final	Notes
1st place, gold medalist(s)	Kevin Young	United States	48.76	47.63	46.78	WR
2nd place, silver medalist(s)	Winthrop Graham	Jamaica	48.51	47.62	47.66	
3rd place, bronze medalist(s)	Kriss Akabusi	Great Britain	48.98	48.01	47.82	
4	Stéphane Diagana	France	48.41	48.28	48.13	
5	Niklas Wallenlind	Sweden	48.71	48.35	48.63	
6	Oleh Tverdokhlib	Unified Team	48.68	49.11	48.63	
7	Stéphane Caristan	France	49.16	49.50	48.86	
8	David Patrick	United States	49.56	48.47	49.26	
9	McClinton Neal	United States	49.13	48.71	Did not advance	
10	Erick Keter	Kenya	48.28	49.01	Did not advance	
11	Carsten Köhrbrück	Germany	49.37	49.41	Did not advance	
12	Barnabas Kinyor	Kenya	48.90	49.52	Did not advance	
13	Sven Nylander	Sweden	49.49	49.64	Did not advance	
14	Eronilde de Araújo	Brazil	49.10	49.66	Did not advance	
15	Samuel Matete	Zambia	49.89	DSQ	Did not advance	
16	Olaf Hense	Germany	49.97	DNS	Did not advance	
17	Yoshihiko Saito	Japan	49.01	Did not advance		
18	Fabrizio Mori	Italy	49.16	Did not advance		
19	Mark Jackson	Canada	49.18	Did not advance		
20	Gideon Yego	Kenya	49.23	Did not advance		
21	Pedro Rodrigues	Portugal	49.46	Did not advance		
22	Amadou Dia Ba	Senegal	49.47	Did not advance		
23	Athanassios Kalogiannis	Greece	49.52	Did not advance		
24	Simon Hollingsworth	Australia	49.74	Did not advance		
25	Andries Vorster	South Africa	49.75	Did not advance		
26	Domingo Cordero	Puerto Rico	50.19	Did not advance		
27	Asen Markov	Bulgaria	50.21	Did not advance		
28	Jozef Kucej	Czechoslovakia	50.28	Did not advance		
29	Paweł Woźniak	Poland	50.30	Did not advance		
29	Kazuhiko Yamazaki	Japan	50.30	Did not advance		
31	Aleksey Bazarov	Israel	50.33	Did not advance		
32	Ghulam Abbas	Pakistan	50.57	Did not advance		
33	Chanon Keanchan	Thailand	50.60	Did not advance		
34	Vadim Zadoynov	Unified Team	51.21	Did not advance		
35	Hubert Rakotombelontsoa	Madagascar	51.54	Did not advance		
36	Jacques-Henri Brunet	Central African Republic	52.59	Did not advance		
37	Giovanny Fanny	Seychelles	52.63	Did not advance		
38	Alex Foster	Costa Rica	52.93	Did not advance		
39	Baobo Neuendorf	Papua New Guinea	53.30	Did not advance		
40	Autiko Daunakamakama	Fiji	53.90	Did not advance		
41	Amadou Sy Savane	Guinea	54.26	Did not advance		
42	Abdullah Sabt Ghulam	United Arab Emirates	56.20	Did not advance		
43	Paeaki Kokohu	Tonga	56.99	Did not advance		
44	Richard Bentley	Guam	57.04	Did not advance		
45	Pedro Chiamulera	Brazil	DNF	Did not advance		
45	Max Robertson	Great Britain	DNF	Did not advance		
47	Mark Thompson	Jamaica	DSQ	Did not advance		
—	Zeid Abou Hamed	Syria	DNS	Did not advance		
—	Fadhel Khayati	Tunisia	DNS	Did not advance		

== See also ==
- 1990 Men's European Championships 400m Hurdles (Split)
- 1991 Men's World Championships 400m Hurdles (Tokyo)
- 1993 Men's World Championships 400m Hurdles (Stuttgart)
- 1994 Men's European Championships 400m Hurdles (Helsinki)
