= 1991 World Championships in Athletics – Men's 400 metres hurdles =

These are the official results of the Men's 400 metres Hurdles event at the 1991 IAAF World Championships in Tokyo, Japan. There were a total number of 36 participating athletes, with five qualifying heats, two semi-finals and the final held on Tuesday August 27, 1991.

== Schedule ==
- All times are Japan Standard Time (UTC+9)

Heats
25.08.1991 – 17:30h
Semi-Finals
26.08.1991 – 18:45h
Final
27.08.1991 – 18:00h

== Final ==
RANK	FINAL	TIME
	Samuel Matete (ZAM)	47.64
	Winthrop Graham (JAM)	47.74
	Kriss Akabusi (GBR)	47.86
4.	Kevin Young (USA)	48.01
5.	Danny Harris (USA)	48.46
6.	Derrick Adkins (USA)	49.28
7.	Erick Keter (KEN)	49.99
8.	Niklas Wallenlind (SWE)	50.28

== Semi-finals ==
- Held on Monday 1991-08-26

RANK	HEAT 1	TIME
1.	Danny Harris (USA)	48.21
2.	Winthrop Graham (JAM)	48.31
3.	Derrick Adkins (USA)	49.37
4.	Niklas Wallenlind (SWE)	49.81
5.	Eronilde de Araujo (BRA)	49.91
6.	Shunji Karube (JPN)	49.94
7.	Gideon Yego (KEN)	50.07
8.	Fabrizio Mori (ITA)	50.70

RANK	HEAT 2	TIME
1.	Kriss Akabusi (GBR)	47.91
2.	Samuel Matete (ZAM)	48.30
3.	Kevin Young (USA)	48.39
4.	Erick Keter (KEN)	48.47
5.	Vladimir Budko (URS)	49.53
6.	Sven Nylander (SWE)	49.59
7.	Domingo Cordero (PUR)	49.86
8.	Pedro Chiamulera (BRA)	50.02

== Qualifying heats ==
- Held on Sunday 1991-08-25

RANK	HEAT 1	TIME
1.	Danny Harris (USA)	48.32
2.	Erick Keter (KEN)	48.62
3.	Fabrizio Mori (ITA)	48.92
4.	Amadou Dia Ba (SEN)	49.77
5.	Olaf Hense (GER)	50.44
6.	Pedro Rodrigues (POR)	50.50
7.	Marc Dollendorf (BEL)	51.45

RANK	HEAT 2	TIME
1.	Kriss Akabusi (GBR)	48.79
2.	Vladimir Budko (URS)	49.26
3.	Eronilde de Araujo (BRA)	49.60
4.	Niklas Wallenlind (SWE)	49.77
5.	Kazuhiko Yamazaki (JPN)	49.97
6.	Michael Grün (GER)	50.30
7.	Ghulam Abbas (PAK)	52.83

RANK	HEAT 3	TIME
1.	Kevin Young (USA)	49.08
2.	Gideon Yego (KEN)	49.59
3.	Pedro Chiamulera (BRA)	49.67
4.	Yoshihiko Saito (JPN)	49.89
5.	Alain Cuypers (BEL)	50.21
6.	Antonio Smith (VEN)	50.59
7.	Carsten Köhrbrück (GER)	50.88

RANK	HEAT 4	TIME
1.	Winthrop Graham (JAM)	49.13
2.	Sven Nylander (SWE)	49.61
3.	Krasimir Demirev (BUL)	49.77
4.	Jozef Kucej (TCH)	49.93
5.	Paolo Bellino (ITA)	50.74
6.	Ahmed Abdelhalim Ghanem (EGY)	50.98
7.	Sylvain Moreau (FRA)	51.26
8.	Hamed Ziad Abou (SYR)	51.57

RANK	HEAT 5	TIME
1.	Samuel Matete (ZAM)	49.13
2.	Derrick Adkins (USA)	49.40
3.	Shunji Karube (JPN)	49.57
4.	Domingo Cordero (PUR)	49.60
5.	Mark Jackson (CAN)	50.13
6.	Leigh Miller (AUS)	51.76
—	Gideon Biwott (KEN)	DSQ

== See also ==
- 1988 Men's Olympic 400m Hurdles (Seoul)
- 1990 Men's European Championships 400m Hurdles (Split)
- 1992 Men's Olympic 400m Hurdles (Barcelona)
