= 400 meter hurdles at the NCAA Division I Outdoor Track and Field Championships =

This is a list of NCAA Division I outdoor champions in the 400 meter hurdles or its imperial equivalent, the 440 yard hurdles. For men, the imperial distance was contested from 1932 to 1975 excepting Olympic years, when the metric distance was contested. Metrication occurred in 1976, so all subsequent championships were at the metric distance. Hand timing was used until 1973, while starting in 1974 fully automatic timing was used. The women's race began in 1982.

== Women ==
Key
A=Altitude assisted

Year	Name, (Country)	Team	Time
1982	Tonja Brown	Florida St	56.46
1983	Judi Brown	Michigan St	56.44
1984	Nawal El Moutawakil Morocco	Iowa St	55.84
1985	LaTanya Sheffield	San Diego St	54.64
1986	Maria Usifo Nigeria	Texas Southern	55.16
1987	Linetta Wilson	Nebraska	55.55
1988	Schowonda Williams	Louisiana St	55.53
1989	Janeene Vickers	UCLA	55.27
1990	Janeene Vickers	UCLA	55.40
1991	Janeene Vickers	UCLA	55.65
1992	Tonja Buford	Illinois	55.12
1993	Debbie-Ann Parris Jamaica	Louisiana St	56.37
1994	Debbie-Ann Parris Jamaica	Louisiana St	55.54
1995	Tonya Williams	Illinois	55.17
1996	Tonya Williams	Illinois	54.56
1997	Ryan Tolbert	Vanderbilt	54.54
1998	Rosa Jolivet	Texas A&M	55.24
1999	Joanna Hayes	UCLA	55.16
2000	Natasha Danvers United Kingdom	Southern Cal	55.26
2001	Brenda Taylor	Harvard	55.88
2002	Lashinda Demus	South Carolina	54.85
2003	Sheena Johnson	UCLA	54.24
2004	Sheena Johnson	UCLA	53.54
2005	Shauna Smith	Wyoming	54.32
2006	Markita James	Auburn	54.47
2007	Nicole M. Leach	UCLA	54.32
2008	Nickiesha Wilson Jamaica	LSU	54.45
2009	Nicole M. Leach	UCLA	
2010	Queen Quedith Harrison	Virginia Tech	54.55
2011	Ti'erra Brown	Miami	55.65
2012	Cassandra Tate	LSU	55.22
2013	Kori Carter	Stanford	53.21
2014	Shamier Little	Texas A&M	55.07
2015	Shamier Little	Texas A&M	53.74
2016	Shamier Little	Texas A&M	53.51
2017	Sage Watson Canada	Arizona	54.52
2018	Sydney McLaughlin	Kentucky	53.96
2019	Anna Cockrell	USC	55.23
2021	Anna Cockrell	USC	54.68
2022	Britton Wilson	Arkansas	53.86
2023	Savannah Sutherland	Michigan	54.45
2024	Jasmine Jones	USC	53.15
2025	Savannah Sutherland (CAN)	Michigan	52.46
2026	Akala Garrett	South Carolina	53.32

== Men ==
Key
y=yards
A=Altitude assisted

Year	Name, (Country)	Team	Time
1932	Eugene Beatty	Michigan State Normal College	52.9
1933	not held		
1934	not held		
1935	not held		
1936	Bob Osgood	Michigan	53.4
1937	not held		
1938	not held		
1939	not held		
1940	not held		
1941	not held		
1942	not held		
1943	not held		
1944	not held		
1945	not held		
1946	not held		
1947	not held		
1948	George Walker	Illinois	52.4
1949	not held		
1950	not held		
1951	not held		
1952	Bob DeVinney	Kansas	51.7
1953	not held		
1954	not held		
1955	not held		
1956	Aubrey Lewis	Notre Dame	51
1957	not held		
1958	not held		
1959	Dick Howard	New Mexico	50.6y
1960	Cliff Cushman	Kansas	50.8
1961	Dixon Farmer	Occidental	50.8y
1962	Jerry Tarr	Oregon	50.3y
1963	Rex Cawley	Southern Cal	49.6Ay
1964	Billy Hardin	Louisiana St	50.2
1965	Larry Godfrey	San Diego St	51.5y
1966	Bob Steele	Michigan St	50.4y
1967	Bob Steele	Michigan St	50.2Ay
1968	David Hemery United Kingdom	Boston	49.8
1969	Ralph Mann	Brigham Y	49.6y
1970	Ralph Mann	Brigham Y	48.8y
1971	Ralph Mann	Brigham Y	49.6y
1972	Bruce Collins	Pennsylvania	49.1
1973	Robert Primeaux	Texas	49.63y
1974	Bruce Collins	Pennsylvania	50.30y
1975	Craig Caudill	Indiana	50.44Ay
1976	Quentin Wheeler	San Diego St	48.55
1977	Tom Andrews	Southern Cal	49.48
1978	James Walker	Auburn	48.92
1979	James Walker	Auburn	48.68
1980	David Lee	Southern Illinois	48.87
1981	Andre Phillips	UCLA	49.12
1982	Dave Patrick	Tennessee	48.44A
1983	Sven Nylander Sweden	Southern Meth	48.88
1984	Danny Harris	Iowa St	48.81
1985	Danny Harris	Iowa St	48.42
1986	Danny Harris	Iowa St	48.33
1987	Kevin Young	UCLA	48.9
1988	Kevin Young	UCLA	47.85
1989	Winthrop Graham Jamaica	Texas	48.55A
1990	McClinton Neal	Texas-Arlington	49.23
1991	Samuel Matete Zambia	Auburn	49.12
1992	Dan Steele	Eastern Illinois	49.79
1993	Bryan Bronson	Rice	49.07
1994	Octavius Terry	Georgia Tech	49.85
1995	Ken Harnden Zimbabwe	North Carolina	48.72
1996	Neil Gardner Jamaica	Michigan	49.27
1997	Joey Woody	Northern Iowa	48.59
1998	Angelo Taylor	Georgia Tech	48.14
1999	Bayano Kamani Panama	Baylor	48.68
2000	Félix Sánchez Dominican Republic	Southern Cal	48.41
2001	Bayano Kamani Panama	Baylor	48.99
2002	Rickey Harris	Florida	48.16
2003	Dean Griffiths Jamaica	Auburn	48.55
2004	Kerron Clement	Florida	49.05
2005	Kerron Clement	Florida	47.56
2006	Michael Tinsley	Jackson St	48.25
2007	Isa Phillips Jamaica	LSU	48.51
2008	Jeshua Anderson	Washington State	48.69
2009	Jeshua Anderson	Washington State	48.47
2010	Johnny Dutch	South Carolina	48.75
2011	Jeshua Anderson	Washington State	48.56
2012	Amaechi Morton	Stanford	48.79
2013	Reggie Wyatt	USC	48.58
2014	Miles Ukaoma Nigeria	Nebraska	49.23
2015	Michael Stigler	Kansas	48.84
2016	Eric Futch	Florida	48.91
2017	Eric Futch	Florida	48.32
2018	Rai Benjamin	California	47.02
2019	Quincy Hall	South Carolina	48.48
2020	Cancelled Due To Coronavirus	Cancelled Due To Coronavirus	
2021	Sean Burrell	LSU Tigers	47.85
2022	Sean Burrell	LSU Tigers	48.70
2023	Chris Robinson	Alabama	48.12
2024	Caleb Dean (USA)	Texas Tech	47.23
2025	Ezekiel Nathaniel (NGR)	Baylor	47.49
2026	Vance Nilsson	Florida	48.06
