= Athletics at the 1987 Pan American Games – Men's 400 metres hurdles =

Men's 400 metres hurdles at the Pan American Games

The men's 400 metres hurdles event at the 1987 Pan American Games was held in Indianapolis, United States on 10 and 12 August.

== Medalists ==
| Gold | Silver | Bronze |
|---|---|---|
| Winthrop Graham; Jamaica | Kevin Young; United States | David Patrick; United States |

== Results ==
=== Heats ===
| Rank | Heat | Name | Nationality | Time | Notes |
|---|---|---|---|---|---|
| 1 | 2 | Winthrop Graham | Jamaica | 49.85 | Q |
| 2 | 1 | David Patrick | United States | 49.97 | Q |
| 3 | 2 | Kevin Young | United States | 50.16 | Q |
| 4 | 2 | John Graham | Canada | 50.24 | Q |
| 5 | 1 | Randy Cox | Trinidad and Tobago | 50.30 | Q |
| 6 | 1 | Antônio Dias Ferreira | Brazil | 50.49 | Q |
| 7 | 1 | Pablo Squella | Chile | 50.65 | q |
| 8 | 1 | Greg Rolle | Bahamas | 50.77 | q |
| 9 | 2 | Pedro Chiamulera | Brazil | 51.10 | |
| 10 | 2 | David Charlton | Bahamas | 51.58 | |
| 11 | 1 | Domingo Cordero | Puerto Rico | 51.95 | |
| 12 | 2 | Efrain Pedroza | Mexico | 52.87 | |
| 13 | 1 | Oral Selkridge | Antigua and Barbuda | 53.45 | |
| 14 | 2 | Mauricio Carranza | El Salvador | 55.38 | |
| | 2 | Floyd Brown | United States Virgin Islands | DNF | |

=== Final ===
| Rank | Name | Nationality | Time | Notes |
|---|---|---|---|---|
| 1st place, gold medalist(s) | Winthrop Graham | Jamaica | 48.49 | GR, NR |
| 2nd place, silver medalist(s) | Kevin Young | United States | 48.74 | |
| 3rd place, bronze medalist(s) | David Patrick | United States | 49.47 | |
| 4 | John Graham | Canada | 49.51 | NR |
| 5 | Pablo Squella | Chile | 50.17 | |
| 6 | Antônio Dias Ferreira | Brazil | 50.20 | |
| 7 | Randy Cox | Trinidad and Tobago | 50.47 | |
| 8 | Greg Rolle | Bahamas | 50.50 | |
