= Athletics at the 1991 Summer Universiade – Men's 400 metres hurdles =

The men's 400 metres hurdles event at the 1991 Summer Universiade was held at the Don Valley Stadium in Sheffield on 23 and 24 July 1991.

== Medalists ==
Gold	Silver	Bronze
Derrick Adkins; United States	Yoshihiko Saito; Japan	Oleg Tverdokhleb; Soviet Union

== Results ==
=== Heats ===
Rank	Heat	Athlete	Nationality	Time	Notes
1	1	Derrick Adkins	United States	49.96	Q
2	3	Yoshihiko Saito	Japan	50.65	Q
3	1	Marc Dollendorf	Belgium	50.81	Q
4	3	Pedro Rodrigues	Portugal	50.94	Q
5	3	Oleg Tverdokhleb	Soviet Union	51.02	q
6	2	Vladimir Budko	Soviet Union	51.26	Q
7	1	Kazuhiko Yamazaki	Japan	51.30	q
8	2	Giorgio Frinolli	Italy	51.41	Q
9	3	Mugur Mateescu	Romania	51.87	
10	1	Paweł Woźniak	Poland	52.10	
11	1	Enzo Franciosi	Italy	52.11	
12	2	Robert Rucker	United States	52.28	
13	3	Son Joon	South Korea	52.33	
14	2	Gilbert Hashan	Mauritius	52.79	
15	3	Thomas Zverina	Canada	52.81	
16	1	Hamdi Jafaar	Malaysia	52.92	
17	2	Radek Bartakovič	Czechoslovakia	53.00	
18	2	Mark Davidson	Great Britain	53.28	
19	1	Nuno Alpiarça	Portugal	54.22	
20	2	Peter Cheruiyot	Kenya	54.78	
21	3	Henry Kiptoo	Kenya	55.57	
22	2	Damith Hettihewa	Sri Lanka	1:08.85	

=== Final ===
Rank	Athlete	Nationality	Time	Notes
1st place, gold medalist(s)	Derrick Adkins	United States	49.01	
2nd place, silver medalist(s)	Yoshihiko Saito	Japan	50.02	
3rd place, bronze medalist(s)	Oleg Tverdokhleb	Soviet Union	50.09	
4	Vladimir Budko	Soviet Union	50.13	
5	Marc Dollendorf	Belgium	50.18	
6	Kazuhiko Yamazaki	Japan	50.53	
7	Pedro Rodrigues	Portugal	50.76	
8	Giorgio Frinolli	Italy	51.21	
