= Athletics at the 1991 Pan American Games – Men's 400 metres hurdles =

Men's 400 metres hurdles at the Pan American Games

The men's 400 metres hurdles event at the 1991 Pan American Games was held in Havana, Cuba on 8 and 10 August.

== Medalists ==
Gold	Silver	Bronze
Eronilde de Araújo; Brazil	McClinton Neal; United States	Torrance Zellner; United States

== Results ==
=== Heats ===
Rank	Heat	Name	Nationality	Time	Notes
1	2	Torrance Zellner	United States	50.39	Q
2	2	Eronilde de Araújo	Brazil	50.43	Q
3	1	McClinton Neal	United States	50.59	Q
4	2	Pedro Piñera	Cuba	50.71	Q
5	1	Domingo Cordero	Puerto Rico	50.78	Q
6	1	Juan Hernández	Cuba	50.81	Q
7	2	Mark Thompson	Jamaica	51.03	q
8	2	Antonio Smith	Venezuela	51.10	q
9	1	Mitchell Francis	Jamaica	53.54	
10	1	Laurier Primeau	Canada	54.44	
11	1	Mauricio Caranza	El Salvador	56.68	

=== Final ===
Rank	Name	Nationality	Time	Notes
1st place, gold medalist(s)	Eronilde de Araújo	Brazil	49.96	
2nd place, silver medalist(s)	McClinton Neal	United States	50.05	
3rd place, bronze medalist(s)	Torrance Zellner	United States	50.21	
4	Mark Thompson	Jamaica	50.53	
5	Antonio Smith	Venezuela	50.71	
6	Domingo Cordero	Puerto Rico	50.80	
7	Pedro Piñera	Cuba	50.83	
8	Juan Hernández	Cuba	51.07	
