= Kinyor =

Kinyor is a surname of Kenyan origin. Notable people with the surname include:

- Barnabas Kinyor (born 1961), Kenyan 400 metres hurdler
- Job Koech Kinyor (born 1990), Kenyan middle-distance runner, son of Barnabas
