= Athletics at the 1993 Summer Universiade – Men's 400 metres hurdles =

The men's 400 metres hurdles event at the 1993 Summer Universiade was held at the UB Stadium in Buffalo, United States on 14, 15 and 16 July 1993.

== Medalists ==
Gold	Silver	Bronze
Derrick Adkins; United States	Yoshihiko Saito; Japan	Dusán Kovács; Hungary

== Results ==
=== Heats ===
Rank	Heat	Athlete	Nationality	Time	Notes
1	4	Yoshihiko Saito	Japan	49.99	Q
2	2	Samuel Matete	Zambia	50.12	Q
3	3	Derrick Adkins	United States	50.46	Q
4	1	Kazuhiko Yamazaki	Japan	50.52	Q
5	4	Dusán Kovács	Hungary	50.56	Q
6	3	Rohan Robinson	Australia	50.59	Q
7	4	Paolo Bellino	Italy	50.76	Q
8	4	Jean-Paul Bruwier	Belgium	50.86	q
9	2	Marc Dollendorf	Belgium	50.95	Q
10	2	Hubert Rakotombelontsoa	Madagascar	51.00	Q
11	2	Piotr Kotlarski	Poland	51.09	q
12	2	Michael Kaul	Germany	51.17	q
13	3	Mugur Mateescu	Romania	51.29	Q
14	1	Mauro Maurizi	Italy	51.50	Q
15	4	Johnathon Schmidt	New Zealand	51.63	q
16	1	Mark Jackson	Canada	51.68	Q
17	3	Santiago Fraga	Spain	51.74	
18	1	Ali Ismail Doka	Qatar	52.03	
19	1	Torrance Zellner	United States	52.10	
20	3	Samuel Madonsela	South Africa	52.47	
21	1	Marco Mina	Peru	53.03	
22	2	Chen Fang-cheng	Chinese Taipei	53.54	
23	4	Arnold Persulessy	Indonesia	53.75	
24	3	Grant Coutts	New Zealand	53.84	
25	4	Mauricio Carranza	El Salvador	54.18	
26	1	Shehzed Ishaque	Pakistan	55.39	
27	2	Pablo Agosto	Puerto Rico	55.46	
28	4	Ravindra Jayasinghe	Sri Lanka	59.77	
29	1	Ibrahim Munu	Sierra Leone	1:01.02	

=== Semifinals ===
Rank	Heat	Athlete	Nationality	Time	Notes
1	1	Yoshihiko Saito	Japan	49.24	Q
2	2	Samuel Matete	Zambia	49.29	Q
3	2	Derrick Adkins	United States	49.48	Q
4	1	Rohan Robinson	Australia	49.77	Q
5	1	Jean-Paul Bruwier	Belgium	49.83	Q
6	1	Dusán Kovács	Hungary	49.96	Q
7	1	Hubert Rakotombelontsoa	Madagascar	50.22	
8	2	Kazuhiko Yamazaki	Japan	50.41	Q
9	2	Piotr Kotlarski	Poland	50.48	Q
10	2	Paolo Bellino	Italy	50.53	
11	1	Mauro Maurizi	Italy	50.77	
12	2	Mugur Mateescu	Romania	51.33	
13	2	Michael Kaul	Germany	51.36	
14	1	Johnathon Schmidt	New Zealand	51.56	
15	2	Marc Dollendorf	Belgium	51.82	
16	1	Mark Jackson	Canada	51.96	

=== Final ===
Rank	Lane	Athlete	Nationality	Time	Notes
1st place, gold medalist(s)	4	Derrick Adkins	United States	49.35	
2nd place, silver medalist(s)	5	Yoshihiko Saito	Japan	49.61	
3rd place, bronze medalist(s)	1	Dusán Kovács	Hungary	50.12	
4	3	Samuel Matete	Zambia	50.31	
5	8	Kazuhiko Yamazaki	Japan	50.34	
6	6	Rohan Robinson	Australia	50.38	
7	2	Jean-Paul Bruwier	Belgium	51.53	
8	7	Piotr Kotlarski	Poland	51.55	
