= 1993 IAAF World Indoor Championships – Men's 4 × 400 metres relay =

The men's 4 × 400 metres relay event at the 1993 IAAF World Indoor Championships was held on 13 March.

== Results ==
Rank	Nation	Athletes	Time	Notes
1st place, gold medalist(s)	United States	Darnell Hall, Brian Irvin, Jason Rouser, Mark Everett	3:04.20	
2nd place, silver medalist(s)	Trinidad and Tobago	Dazel Jules, Alvin Daniel, Neil de Silva, Ian Morris	3:07.02	NR
3rd place, bronze medalist(s)	Japan	Masayoshi Kan, Seiji Inagaki, Yoshihiko Saito, Hiroyuki Hayashi	3:07.30	AR
4	Canada	O'Brian Gibbons, Mark Graham, David Anderson, Byron Goodwin	3:07.77	NR
5	Jamaica	Howard Davis, Anthony Price, Anthony Wallace, Devon Morris	3:08.47	NR
	Italy	Andrea Montanari, Vito Petrella, Fabio Grossi, Alessandro Aimar	DQ	
