= Eronilde de Araújo =

Brazilian hurdler

Personal information
- Full name: Eronilde Nunes de Araújo
- Born: 31 December 1970 (age 55) Bom Jesus da Lapa, Bahia, Brazil

Sport
- Event: 400 metres hurdles

Achievements and titles
- Personal bests: 400 m: 45.75 (Sao Leopoldo 1997); 400 mH: 48.04 (Nice 1995)
Medal record
Representing Brazil
Pan American Games
Gold medal – first place	1991 Havana	400m hurdles
Gold medal – first place	1995 Mar del Plata	400m hurdles
Gold medal – first place	1999 Winnipeg	400m hurdles
Silver medal – second place	1999 Winnipeg	4x400m relay

Eronilde Nunes de Araújo (born 31 December 1970 in Bom Jesus da Lapa, Bahia) is a Brazilian former athlete who specialized in 400 metres hurdles. He dominated athletic events on the South American scene during the 1990s. His personal best of 48.04 seconds was also the South American record until it was broken by Bayano Kamani. He represented his country three times at the Olympics.

== International competitions ==
Year	Competition	Venue	Position	Event	Notes
Representing Brazil
1988	South American Junior Championships	Cubatão, Brazil	1st	4 × 400 m relay	3:12.94
1989	South American Junior Championships	Montevideo, Uruguay	1st	400 m hurdles	51.12
1989	South American Junior Championships	Montevideo, Uruguay	1st	4 × 400 m relay	3:14.84
1989	Pan American Junior Championships	Santa Fe, Argentina	2nd	400 m hurdles	51.20
1989	Pan American Junior Championships	Santa Fe, Argentina	2nd	4 × 400 m relay	3:13.22
1990	Ibero-American Championships	Manaus, Brazil	1st	400m hurdles	49.82
1990	Ibero-American Championships	Manaus, Brazil	1st	4 × 400 m relay	3:09.2
1991	South American Championships	Manaus, Brazil	1st	400 m hurdles	49.65
1991	Pan American Games	Havana, Cuba	1st	400 m hurdles	49.96
1991	World Championships	Tokyo, Japan	12th (sf)	400 m hurdles	49.91
1992	Ibero-American Championships	Seville, Spain	1st	400m hurdles	50.06
1992	Ibero-American Championships	Seville, Spain	2nd	4 × 400 m relay	3:03.50
1992	Olympic Games	Barcelona, Spain	14th (sf)	400 m hurdles	49.66
1992	Olympic Games	Barcelona, Spain	8th (sf)	4 × 400 m relay	3:01.38
1993	World Indoor Championships	Toronto, Canada	12th (h)	400 m	47.50
1993	South American Championships	Lima, Peru	1st	400 m hurdles	49.80
1993	South American Championships	Lima, Peru	1st	4 × 400 m relay	3:09.0
1993	World Championships	Stuttgart, Germany	37th (h)	400 m hurdles	50.81
1994	Ibero-American Championships	Mar del Plata, Argentina	3rd	400 m hurdles	50.36
1994	Ibero-American Championships	Mar del Plata, Argentina	1st	4 × 400 m relay	3:06.54
1994	World Cup	London, United Kingdom	3rd	400 m hurdles	49.62
1995	Pan American Games	Mar del Plata, Argentina	1st	400 m hurdles	49.29
1995	Pan American Games	Mar del Plata, Argentina	4th	4 × 400 m relay	3:07.54
1995	South American Championships	Manaus, Brazil	1st	400 m hurdles	48.63
1995	South American Championships	Manaus, Brazil	1st	4 × 400 m relay	3:04.93
1995	World Championships	Gothenburg, Sweden	8th	400 m hurdles	49.86
1996	Olympic Games	Atlanta, United States	8th	400 m hurdles	48.78
1996	Olympic Games	Atlanta, United States	11th (sf)	4 × 400 m relay	3:03.46
1997	South American Championships	Mar del Plata, Argentina	1st	400 m hurdles	49.35
1997	South American Championships	Mar del Plata, Argentina	1st	4 × 400 m relay	3:04.20
1998	Ibero-American Championships	Lisbon, Portugal	1st	400 m hurdles	48.96
1999	South American Championships	Bogotá, Colombia	1st	400 m hurdles	49.13
1999	South American Championships	Bogotá, Colombia	1st	4 × 400 m relay	3:02.09
1999	Pan American Games	Winnipeg, Canada	1st	400 m hurdles	48.23
1999	Pan American Games	Winnipeg, Canada	2nd	4 × 400 m relay	2:58.56
1999	World Championships	Seville, Spain	4th	400 m hurdles	48.13
1999	World Championships	Seville, Spain	17th (h)	4 × 400 m relay	3:05.70
2000	Ibero-American Championships	Rio de Janeiro, Brazil	1st	400 m hurdles	49.35
2000	Olympic Games	Sydney, Australia	5th	400 m hurdles	48.34
2001	World Championships	Edmonton, Canada	24th (sf)	400 m hurdles	51.23
2002	Ibero-American Championships	Guatemala City, Guatemala	2nd	400 m hurdles	50.78
2003	South American Championships	Barquisimeto, Venezuela	3rd	400 m hurdles	50.81
2003	South American Championships	Barquisimeto, Venezuela	1st	4 × 400 m relay	3:05.28
2003	Pan American Games	Santo Domingo, Dominican Republic	8th	400 m hurdles	51.19
2004	Ibero-American Championships	Huelva, Spain	8th (h)	400 m hurdles	51.59
