= Richard Bentley (athlete) =

Guamanian Olympic hurdler

Personal information
- Born: 30 July 1960 (age 65) Guam
- Height: 175 cm (5 ft 9 in)
- Weight: 70 kg (154 lb)

Sport
- Country: Guam
- Sport: Hurdling

Achievements and titles
- Personal best: 54.6

Richard Bentley is a Guamanian Olympic hurdler. He represented his country in the men's 400 metres hurdles at the 1992 Summer Olympics. His time was a 57.04 in the hurdles.
