= Yoshihiko Saito =

Japanese hurdler (born 1972)

Kazuhiko Yamazaki
Personal information
- Nationality: Japanese
- Born: 12 February 1972 (age 54) Tomioka, Gunma, Japan
- Education: Hosei University

Sport
- Country: Japan
- Sport: Track and field
- Event: 400 metres hurdles
- Personal best(s): 400 m: 46.43 (1993); 400 m hurdles: 48.64 (1998)
Medal record
Men's athletics
Representing Japan
World Indoor Championships
Bronze medal – third place	1993 Toronto	4×400 m relay
Asian Games
Silver medal – second place	1994 Hiroshima	400 m hurdles
Silver medal – second place	1998 Bangkok	400 m hurdles
Asian Championships
Gold medal – first place	1991 Kuala Lumpur	400 m hurdles
Gold medal – first place	1991 Kuala Lumpur	4×400 m relay
East Asian Games
Gold medal – first place	1997 Busan	4×400 m relay
Silver medal – second place	1997 Busan	400 m hurdles
Universiade
Silver medal – second place	1991 Sheffield	400 m hurdles
Silver medal – second place	1993 Buffalo	400 m hurdles
Silver medal – second place	1993 Buffalo	4×400 m relay
Bronze medal – third place	1995 Fukuoka	400 m hurdles
World Junior Championships
Silver medal – second place	1990 Plovdiv	400 m hurdles
Asian Junior Championships
Gold medal – first place	1990 Beijing	400 m hurdles
Gold medal – first place	1990 Beijing	4×400 m relay

Yoshihiko Saito (斎藤 嘉彦, Saitō Yoshihiko; born 12 February 1972 in Tomioka, Gunma) is a retired Japanese athlete who specialized in the 400 metres hurdles. He was the first Asian to run under 49 seconds in the event.

With a personal best time of 48.64 seconds, achieved in October 1998 in Kumamoto, he is a former Asian record holder. The Asian record currently belongs to Hadi Soua'an Al-Somaily with 47.53 seconds, and the Japanese record to Dai Tamesue.

== International competitions ==
Year	Competition	Venue	Position	Event	Notes
Representing Japan
1990	Asian Junior Championships	Beijing, China	1st	400 m hurdles	50.89
1990	Asian Junior Championships	Beijing, China	1st	4 × 400 m relay	3:12.47
1990	World Junior Championships	Plovdiv, Bulgaria	2nd	400 m hurdles	49.99
1990	World Junior Championships	Plovdiv, Bulgaria	7th	4 × 400 m relay	3:07.58
1991	Universiade	Sheffield, United Kingdom	2nd	400 m hurdles	50.02
1991	Universiade	Sheffield, United Kingdom	4th	4 × 400 m relay	3:07.82
1991	World Championships	Tokyo, Japan	19th (h)	400 m hurdles	49.89
1991	Asian Championships	Kuala Lumpur, Malaysia	1st	400 m hurdles	50.46
1991	Asian Championships	Kuala Lumpur, Malaysia	1st	4 × 400 m relay	3:05.22
1992	Olympic Games	Barcelona, Spain	9th (h)	400 m hurdles	49.01
1992	Olympic Games	Barcelona, Spain	7th (h)	4 × 400 m relay	3:01.35
1993	World Indoor Championships	Toronto, Canada	3rd	4 × 400 m relay	3:07.30
1993	Universiade	Buffalo, United States	2nd	400 m hurdles	49.61
1993	Universiade	Buffalo, United States	2nd	4 × 400 m relay	3:07.82
1993	World Championships	Stuttgart, Germany	16th (h)	400 m hurdles	49.43
1993	World Championships	Stuttgart, Germany	11th (h)	4 × 400 m relay	3:02.43
1994	Asian Games	Hiroshima, Japan	2nd	400 m hurdles	49.13
1994	Asian Games	Hiroshima, Japan	4th	4 × 400 m relay	3:10.91
1995	World Championships	Gothenburg, Sweden	24th (h)	400 m hurdles	49.91
1995	World Championships	Gothenburg, Sweden	8th (h)	4 × 400 m relay	3:01.46
1995	Universiade	Fukuoka, Japan	3rd	400 m hurdles	49.18
1995	Universiade	Fukuoka, Japan	4th	4 × 400 m relay	3:02.51
1997	East Asian Games	Busan, South Korea	2nd	400 m hurdles	50.41
1997	East Asian Games	Busan, South Korea	1st	4 × 400 m relay	3:04.35
1997	World Championships	Athens, Greece	19th (sf)	400 m hurdles	49.60
1998	Asian Games	Bangkok, Thailand	2nd	400 m hurdles	49.94

== National titles ==
- Japanese Championships
  - 400 metres hurdles: 1992, 1993, 1995, 1998

== Personal bests ==
- 400 metres – 46.43 (Maebashi 1993)
- 400 metres hurdles – 48.64 (Kumamoto 1998)

=== Asian record holder ===
- 400 metres hurdles – 48.68 (Tokyo 1993): Former Asian record

== See also ==
- List of Asian Games medalists in athletics
