= Domingo Cordero =

Puerto Rican hurdler

Personal information
- Born: 17 October 1965 (age 61) Santo Domingo, Dominican Republic

Sport
- Sport: Track and field
Medal record
Representing Puerto Rico
Central American and Caribbean Games
| Gold medal – first place | 1990 Mexico City | 400m hurdles |
| Gold medal – first place | 1993 Ponce | 400m hurdles |
| Silver medal – second place | 1990 Mexico City | 4x100m relay |
| Silver medal – second place | 1993 Ponce | 4x100m relay |

Domingo Antonio Cordero Clase (born 17 October 1965) is a retired Puerto Rican track and field athlete who specialized in the 400 metres hurdles. His personal best time was 49.12 seconds, achieved in July 1991 in Xalapa. This was the Puerto Rican record.

He won gold and silver medals at the 1990 and 1993 Central American and Caribbean Games as well as the 1989 and 1991 Central American and Caribbean Championships. He won the bronze medal at the 1993 Central American and Caribbean Championships and the silver medal in 1995.

He also competed at the Olympic Games in 1988, 1992 and 1996 as well as the World Championships in 1991, 1993, 1995 and 1997 without reaching the final.

== International competition record ==
| Year | Competition | Venue | Position | Event | Notes |
Representing Puerto Rico
| 1984 | Central American and Caribbean; Junior Championships (U-20) | San Juan, Puerto Rico | 2nd | 400 m hurdles | 53.37 |
| 1986 | Central American and Caribbean Games | Santiago, Dominican Republic | 9th (h) | 400 m hurdles | 52.50 |
| 1986 | Central American and Caribbean Games | Santiago, Dominican Republic | 5th | 4 × 400 m relay | 3:10.65 |
| 1987 | Universiade | Zagreb, Yugoslavia | 19th (h) | 400 m | 48.18 |
| 1987 | Universiade | Zagreb, Yugoslavia | 25th (h) | 400 m hurdles | 52.70 |
| 1987 | Pan American Games | Indianapolis, United States | 11th (h) | 400 m hurdles | 51.95 |
| 1988 | Ibero-American Championships | Mexico City, Mexico | 2nd | 400 m hurdles | 49.61 A |
| 1988 | Olympic Games | Seoul, South Korea | 27th (h) | 400 m hurdles | 51.26 |
| 1990 | Central American and Caribbean Games | Mexico City, Mexico | 1st | 400 m hurdles | 49.61 |
| 1990 | Central American and Caribbean Games | Mexico City, Mexico | 2nd | 4 × 100 m relay | 39.81 |
| 1991 | Pan American Games | Havana, Cuba | 6th | 400 m hurdles | 50.80 |
| 1991 | World Championships | Tokyo, Japan | 11th (sf) | 400 m hurdles | 49.86 |
| 1992 | Ibero-American Championships | Seville, Spain | 5th | 400m hurdles | 51.25 |
| 1992 | Ibero-American Championships | Seville, Spain | 3rd (h) | 4 × 100 m relay | 41.33 |
| 1992 | Olympic Games | Barcelona, Spain | 26th (h) | 400 m hurdles | 50.19 |
| 1993 | World Championships | Stuttgart, Germany | 19th (sf) | 400 m hurdles | 49.62 |
| 1993 | Central American and Caribbean Games | Ponce, Puerto Rico | 1st | 400 m hurdles | 49.60 |
| 1993 | Central American and Caribbean Games | Ponce, Puerto Rico | 2nd | 4 × 100 m relay | 40.01 |
| 1993 | Central American and Caribbean Games | Ponce, Puerto Rico | 4th | 4 × 400 m relay | 3:08.05 |
| 1995 | World Championships | Gothenburg, Sweden | 31st (h) | 400 m hurdles | 50.42 |
| 1996 | Ibero-American Championships | Medellín, Colombia | 3rd | 400 m hurdles | 49.64 |
| 1996 | Ibero-American Championships | Medellín, Colombia | 2nd | 4 × 100 m relay | 39.93 |
| 1996 | Olympic Games | Atlanta, United States | 46th (h) | 400 m hurdles | 51.20 |
| 1997 | World Championships | Athens, Greece | 45th (h) | 400 m hurdles | 52.26 |
| 1998 | Ibero-American Championships | Lisbon, Portugal | 4th | 400 m hurdles | 50.28 |
| 1998 | Central American and Caribbean Games | Maracaibo, Venezuela | 6th | 400 m hurdles | 50.62 |
| 1998 | Central American and Caribbean Games | Maracaibo, Venezuela | 7th | 4 × 400 m relay | 3:10.68 |
| 1999 | Pan American Games | Winnipeg, Canada | – | 400 m hurdles | DNF |
