= Marc Dollendorf =

Belgian hurdler

Personal information
- Born: 7 February 1966 (age 60) Sankt Vith, Belgium
- Height: 1.92 m (6 ft 4 in)
- Weight: 84 kg (185 lb)

Sport
- Sport: Track and field
- Event: 400 metres hurdles

Marc Dollendorf (born 7 February 1966 in Sankt Vith) is a retired Belgian athlete who specialised in the 400 metres hurdles. He represented his country at the 1996 Summer Olympics as well as four consecutive World Championships starting in 1991.

His personal best in the event is 48.91 seconds set in Atlanta in 1996. This is the standing national records.

== Competition record ==
Year	Competition	Venue	Position	Event	Notes
Representing Belgium
1989	Jeux de la Francophonie	Casablanca, Morocco	5th	400 m hurdles	50.41
1990	European Championships	Split, Yugoslavia	23rd (h)	400 m hurdles	51.60
1991	Universiade	Sheffield, United Kingdom	5th	400 m hurdles	50.18
1991	World Championships	Tokyo, Japan	32nd (h)	400 m hurdles	51.45
1993	Universiade	Buffalo, United States	15th (sf)	400 m hurdles	51.82
1993	World Championships	Stuttgart, Germany	22nd (sf)	400 m hurdles	49.93
1994	Jeux de la Francophonie	Paris, France	2nd	400 m hurdles	50.03
1994	European Championships	Helsinki, Finland	8th (sf)	400 m hurdles	49.34
1995	World Championships	Gothenburg, Sweden	32nd (h)	400 m hurdles	50.47
1996	Olympic Games	Atlanta, United States	14th (sf)	400 m hurdles	48.91
1997	World Championships	Athens, Greece	27th (h)	400 m hurdles	49.66
