= Giovanny Fanny =

Seychellois hurdler

Personal information
- Nationality: Seychellois
- Born: 25 May 1965 (age 61)
- Height: 1.64 m (5 ft 4 1/2 in)
- Weight: 55 kg (121 lb)

Sport
- Sport: Track and field
- Event: Hurdling

Giovanny Fanny (born 25 May 1965) is a Seychellois former hurdling track and field athlete.

Giovanny competed in the men's 400 metres hurdles at the 1992 Summer Olympics but failed to progress to the finals, finishing sixth in heat seven. His personal best in this event was set on 26 August 1990 in Madagascar with a time of 51.80 seconds.

After retiring from competitive sport, Fanny took up employment as a national athletics coach for Seychelles.
