= Asen Markov =

Bulgarian hurdler

Personal information
- Nationality: Bulgarian
- Born: 27 June 1969 (age 57) Sofia
- Height: 186 cm (6 ft 1 in)
- Weight: 66 kg (146 lb)

Sport
- Country: Bulgaria
- Sport: Hurdling

Achievements and titles
- Personal best: 49.82

Asen Markov (Bulgarian: Асен Марков) (born 27 June 1969) is a Bulgarian Olympic hurdler. He represented his country in the men's 400 metres hurdles at the 1992 Summer Olympics. His time was a 50.21 in the hurdles.
