= McClinton Neal =

American athlete, hurdler

Personal information
- Born: July 11, 1968 (age 58) Dallas, Texas, United States

Sport
- Sport: Track and field
Medal record
Representing United States
Pan American Games
Silver medal – second place	1991 Havana	400 m hurdles

McClinton Earl Neal (born July 11, 1968, in Dallas) is an American track and field athlete, know primarily for running the 400 metres hurdles. He represented the United States at the 1992 Olympics. The previous year he earned a silver medal at the 1991 Pan Am Games.

While running for the University of Texas, Arlington, he was the 1990 NCAA Champion. Neal ran his professional career with the Santa Monica Track Club, retiring in 2000.

Since the Olympics Neal has performed stand-up comedy professionally and appeared on General Hospital, The Young and the Restless and in an episode of Arli$$.
