= Erick Keter =

Kenyan hurdler

Medal record

Men's athletics

Representing Kenya

African Championships
Gold medal – first place	1993 Durban	400 m hurdles

Erick Keter (born 22 July 1966, in Kabarusu, Kericho) is a retired Kenyan athlete who specialized in the 400 metres hurdles. He has also been a Kenyan record holder during his career.

== Achievements ==
Year	Competition	Venue	Position	Event	Notes
Representing Kenya
1991	World Championships	Tokyo, Japan	7th	400 m hurdles	
1991	All-Africa Games	Cairo, Egypt	1st	400 m hurdles	
1993	World Championships	Stuttgart, Germany	5th	400 m hurdles	
1993	African Championships	Durban, South Africa	1st	400 m hurdles	
1999	All-Africa Games	Johannesburg, South Africa	3rd	400 m hurdles	
