= Aleksey Bazarov =

Israeli athlete (born 1963)

Personal information
- Native name: אלכסיי באזארוב
- Born: October 14, 1963 (age 62) Soviet Union

Sport
- Sport: Athletics
- Hurdling: 400 metres hurdles

Achievements and titles
- Personal best: 49.33 seconds (June 1988, Leningrad)

Aleksey Bazarov (Hebrew: אלכסיי באזארוב, Russian: Алексей Базаров; born 14 October 1963) is a retired USSR-born Israeli athlete who specialized in the 400 metres hurdles.

He became Soviet champion in 1990, and represented the Soviet Union in hurdles and relay (where the team finished eighth) at the 1990 European Championships. He won his first Israeli championship in 1992, and would win four national titles in total; one of them in the 400 metres. He also competed at the 1992 Olympic Games, the 1993 World Championships and the 1994 European Championships without reaching the final.

His personal best time was 49.33 seconds, achieved in June 1988 in Leningrad.

== See also ==
- List of Israeli records in athletics
- List of Maccabiah records in athletics
