= Paeaki Kokohu =

Tongan hurdler

Paeaki Takaunove Kokohu
Personal information
- Nationality: Tongan
- Born: 2 August 1966 (age 59) Tonga
- Height: 183 cm (6 ft 0 in)
- Weight: 79 kg (174 lb)

Sport
- Country: Tonga
- Sport: Hurdling

Achievements and titles
- Personal best: 51.81

Paeaki Kokohu is a Tongan Olympic hurdler. He represented his country in the men's 400 metres hurdles at the 1992 Summer Olympics. His time was a 56.99 in the qualifiers.
