= Dries Vorster =

South African Olympic hurdler (born 1962)

Andries Stephanus Vorster
Personal information
- Nationality: South African
- Born: 25 October 1962 (age 63) Vryburg
- Height: 185 cm (6 ft 1 in)
- Weight: 79 kg (174 lb)

Sport
- Country: Vorster (RSA)
- Sport: Hurdling

Achievements and titles
- Personal best: 48.46
Medal record
Men's athletics
Representing South Africa
African Championships
Gold medal – first place	1992 Belle Vue Harel	400 m hurdles
Gold medal – first place	1992 Belle Vue Harel	4×400 m
Silver medal – second place	1993 Durban	400 m hurdles

Andries "Dries" Vorster is a South African Olympic hurdler. He represented his country in the men's 400 metres hurdles at the 1992 Summer Olympics. His time was a 49.75 in the hurdles.
