= Barnabas Kinyor =

Kenyan hurdler

Barnabas Agui Kinyor (born 3 August 1961 in Nandi Hills) is a retired Kenyan athlete who specialized in the 400 metres hurdles.

He finished seventh at the 1990 Commonwealth Games, eighth at the 1993 World Championships and won the bronze medal at the 1994 Commonwealth Games. He also competed at the 1992 and 1996 Olympic Games as well as the 1995 World Championships without reaching the final.

His personal best time was 48.90 seconds, achieved in the heats of the 1992 Olympics.

== Private life ==
His son Job Kinyor is a professional middle-distance runner. With his wife Salina Kosgei (also a runner) he has two children: Billy (born 1996) and Ruth (born 2001).
