= Kriss Akabusi =

British athlete (born 1958)

Kriss Akabusi MBE
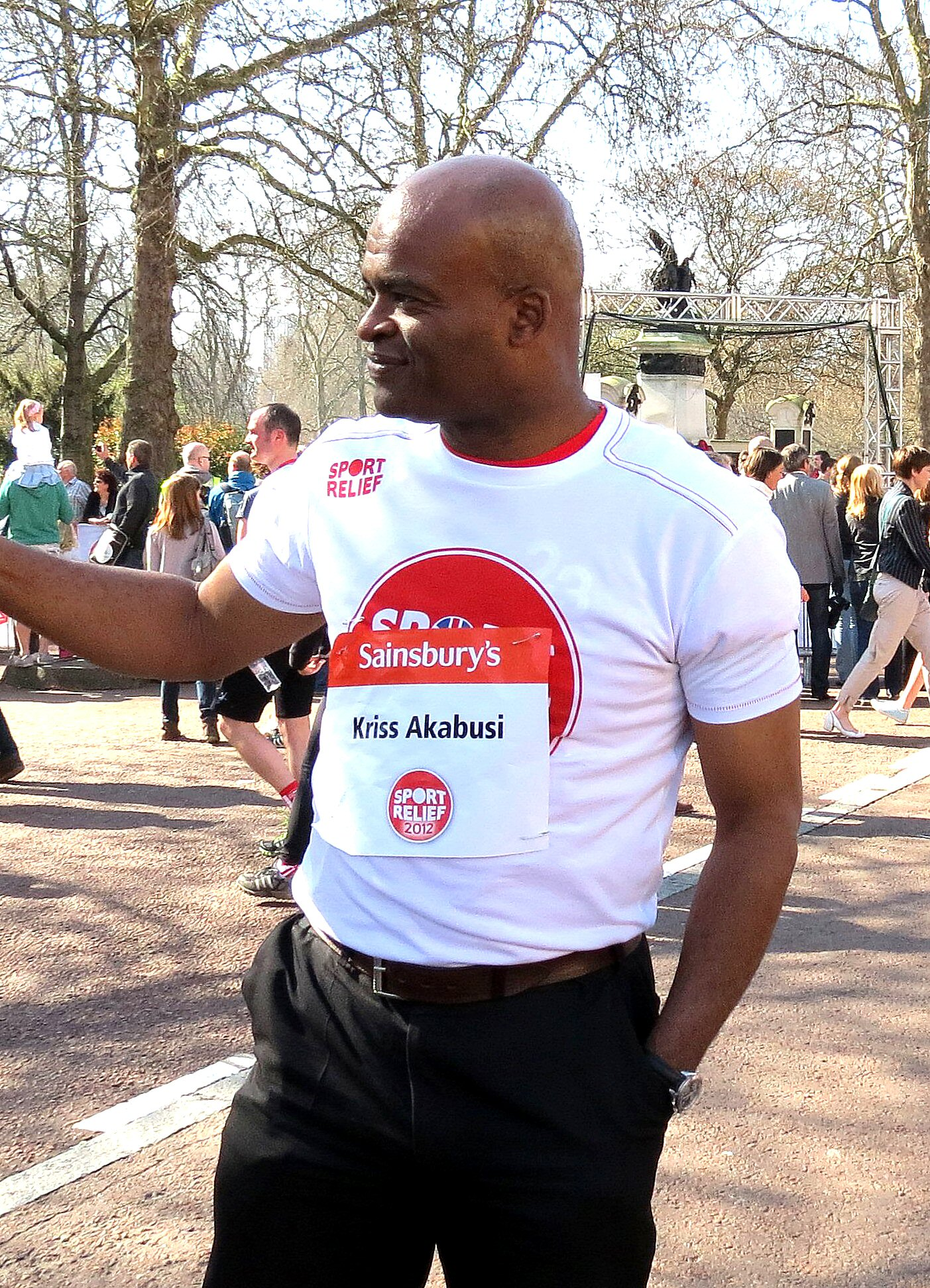
- Akabusi at Hyde Park, 2012

Personal information
- Nationality: British (English)
- Born: 28 November 1958 (age 67) Paddington, London, England
- Height: 1.85 m (6 ft 1 in)
- Weight: 81 kg (179 lb)

Sport
- Sport: Track and field
- Events: Sprinting, hurdling
- Club: Southampton & Eastleigh A.A.C./Team Solent
Medal record
Men's athletics
Representing Great Britain
Olympic Games
Silver medal – second place	1984 Los Angeles	4 × 400 m relay
Bronze medal – third place	1992 Barcelona	400 m hurdles
Bronze medal – third place	1992 Barcelona	4 × 400 m relay
World Championships
Gold medal – first place	1991 Tokyo	4 × 400 m relay
Silver medal – second place	1987 Rome	4 × 400 m relay
Bronze medal – third place	1991 Tokyo	400 m hurdles
European Championships
Gold medal – first place	1986 Stuttgart	4 × 400 m relay
Gold medal – first place	1990 Split	400 m hurdles
Gold medal – first place	1990 Split	4 × 400 m relay
Representing England
Commonwealth Games
Gold medal – first place	1990 Auckland	400 m hurdles

Kezie Uchechukwu Duru Akabusi, MBE (//; born 28 November 1958), known as Kriss Akabusi, is a British broadcaster and former sprint and hurdling track and field athlete.

His first international successes were with the British 4 × 400 metres relay team, winning a silver medal at the 1984 Summer Olympics, golds at the 1986 Commonwealth Games and 1986 European Athletics Championships, and another silver at the 1987 World Championships in Athletics. He progressed individually in 400 metres hurdles from the late 1980s onwards, taking bronze at the 1989 IAAF World Cup. His time of 47.93 seconds to win the 1990 European Athletics Championships was a British record, and he also won gold at the 1990 Commonwealth Games.

He reached the peak of his career over the next two years, winning a hurdles bronze medal at the 1991 World Championships and anchoring the British team to a narrow victory over the American team in 2:57.53 minutes – a British record for the 4 × 400 m relay. He followed this with a British 400 m hurdles record of 47.82 seconds to take the bronze medal at the 1992 Barcelona Olympics, where he also won bronze with the 4 × 400 m relay team. Since retiring from athletics, he has worked as a television presenter and motivational speaker.

== Early life ==
Born in Paddington to Nigerian parents who were studying in London, Akabusi would later be brought up in foster care with his brother Riba, after their parents returned to their country when he was four. Due to the outbreak of the Nigerian Civil War in 1967, Akabusi was unable to stay in contact with his parents, although he would later be reunited with his mother in his teens. She was determined that her son should settle in Nigeria, but while Akabusi was keen to make up for lost time with the rest of his family, he remained in the United Kingdom, eventually visiting the African nation when he was twenty-one. He attended Edmonton County School.

It was during this time that Akabusi, who is of Igbo heritage, changed his first name from 'Kezie' to 'Kriss'. He told an interviewer in 2002: "I decided to make a new start and part of that new start was to have a new name. I spelt my name with a 'K' because I didn't want to change my initials and I want to have some connections with my past. Kezie Akabusi was the connection to my past, but Kriss Akabusi is a connection with my future."

== Military career ==
Akabusi joined the British Army in 1975, having a career in the Royal Corps of Signals before switching to the Army Physical Training Corps (as it was then called) in 1981. In 1990, when he was discharged into the reserves at the end of his army career he held the rank of Warrant Officer Class 2. It was during his tenure in the military that his potential in sports was discovered.

== Athletics career ==
In 1983, Akabusi embarked upon an athletics career, initially specialising in the 400 metres. As a member of the British 4 × 400 m relay team, Akabusi won a silver medal at the 1984 Olympic Games in Los Angeles.

Akabusi became the British 400 metres champion after winning the British AAA Championships title at the 1988 AAA Championships. He was also the British 400 metres hurdles champion after winning the 1992 AAA Championships.

In 1990, Akabusi broke David Hemery's longstanding British 400 m hurdles record of 48.12 seconds on his way to a gold medal at the European Championships, with a time of 47.93 seconds. He also won the 400 metres hurdles gold medal for England at the 1990 Commonwealth Games in Auckland, New Zealand

At the 1991 World Championships in Tokyo, Akabusi won the bronze medal in the 400 m hurdles and a gold medal as a member of the 4 × 400 relay team alongside Roger Black, Derek Redmond and John Regis, with Akabusi as anchor leg. At the start of the final lap, he took the baton in second place behind the American team, but eventually overtook American runner Antonio Pettigrew (who had won the 400 m individual event) on the final straight and crossed the line in first place to win the gold medal for Britain in a time of 2:57.53, a new British record.

At the 1992 Olympic Games in Barcelona Akabusi won the bronze medal in the 400 m hurdles, lowering his British record to 47.82 seconds, a time which still stands. This was the same race in which Kevin Young set the former world record. He also won a bronze in the 4 × 400 m relay.

== Television work ==
Following his retirement from sports, Akabusi became a television presenter, working on several shows including Record Breakers (joining after the death of long-serving presenter Roy Castle in 1994) and The Big Breakfast, and regularly appeared as a panelist on many quiz shows such as A Question of Sport, They Think It's All Over Through the Keyhole and A Word In Your Ear. In 1997 he appeared as a milkman on Last of the Summer Wine in the episode "There Goes the Groom".

Other appearances include: Come Dine with Me in 2011; in an Olympic-themed advert for Nature Valley cereal bars in 2012; a cameo in a red button episode of EastEnders; The Big Fat Quiz of The 80's; A League of Their Own; Never Mind The Buzzcocks and Backchat.

In 2017, Akabusi became a commentator on ITV's Bigheads with Jenny Powell. He also featured on the fifth series of Big Star's Little Star with his son Alannam. Since 2018 he has regularly appeared in adverts for Ladbrokes online betting.

Akabusi makes appearances on GB News reviewing papers

== Honours ==
In 1991 it was announced that he would be appointed a Member of the Order of the British Empire by Queen Elizabeth II in recognition of his services to the country through athletics. In 1992 he was awarded an honorary degree from the University of Southampton.

== Political views ==
In 1998, Akabusi discussed voting for the Conservative Party. In 2011, he supported the 'Yes' side in the Alternative Vote referendum. In August 2014, he was one of 200 public figures who signed a letter to The Guardian expressing their hope that Scotland would vote to remain part of the United Kingdom in September's referendum on that issue. In 2016, Akabusi stated on Twitter he backed Vote Leave and voted for Brexit.

== International competitions ==
- 1984
  - Summer Olympics - Los Angeles, United States.
    - 4 × 400 m. relay silver medal
- 1986
  - Commonwealth Games - Edinburgh, Scotland.
    - 4 × 400 m. relay gold medal
- 1987
  - World Championships - Rome, Italy.
    - 4 × 400 m. relay silver medal
- 1989
  - IAAF World Cup - Barcelona, Spain.
    - 400 m. hurdles bronze medal
  - European Cup - Gateshead, England.
    - 400 m. hurdles gold medal
- 1990
  - Commonwealth Games - Auckland, New Zealand.
    - 400 m. hurdles gold medal
  - European Championships- Split, Yugoslavia.
    - 400 m. hurdles gold medal
- 1991
  - World Championships - Tokyo, Japan.
    - 400 m. hurdles bronze medal
    - 4 × 400 m. relay gold medal
  - European Cup - Frankfurt am Main, Germany.
    - 400 m. hurdles gold medal
- 1992
  - Summer Olympics: Barcelona, Spain.
    - 400 m. hurdles bronze medal
    - 4 × 400 m. relay bronze medal
