= Niklas Wallenlind =

Swedish track and field athlete

Medal record

Men's athletics

Representing Sweden

European Championships
Bronze medal – third place	1990 Split	400 m hurdles

Per Johan Niklas Wallenlind (born 21 November 1968) is a retired track and field athlete from Sweden, who competed in the men's 400 metres hurdles event. He won the bronze medal at the 1990 European Championships in Split, Yugoslavia. His personal best was 48.35, achieved on 5 August 1992 in the semifinal of the men's 400 m hurdles at the 1992 Summer Olympics in Barcelona, Spain.

== Achievements ==
Year	Competition	Venue	Position	Event	Notes
Representing Sweden
1990	European Championships	Split, Yugoslavia	3rd	400m hurdles	48.52
1991	World Championships	Tokyo, Japan	8th	400m hurdles	50.28
1992	Olympic Games	Barcelona, Spain	5th	400m hurdles	48.63
1994	European Championships	Helsinki, Finland	9th	400m hurdles	49.31
