= Winthrop Graham =

Jamaican hurdler (born 1965)

Medal record

Men's athletics

Representing Jamaica

Olympic Games
Silver medal – second place	1988 Seoul	4x400 m relay
Silver medal – second place	1992 Barcelona	400 m hurdles

World Championships
Silver medal – second place	1991 Tokyo	400 m hurdles
Bronze medal – third place	1991 Tokyo	4x400 m relay
Bronze medal – third place	1993 Stuttgart	400 m hurdles

Pan American Games
Gold medal – first place	1987 Indianapolis	400 m hurdles

Central American and Caribbean Games
Gold medal – first place	1986 Santiago	400 m hurdles

Winthrop Graham (born 17 November 1965 in Westmoreland, Jamaica) is a retired athlete who mainly competed in the 400 metres hurdles. He won two Olympic medals and three World Championship medals.

His personal best time was 47.60 seconds, achieved in August 1993 at the Zurich Weltklasse meet where he beat Samuel Matete and Kevin Young. This was also the Jamaican record.

He is married to Yvonne Mai-Graham, a former East German international distance runner.

Collegiately, he competed for the Texas Longhorns.

== International competitions ==
Year	Competition	Venue	Position	Notes
1984	CARIFTA Games (under-20)	Nassau, The Bahamas	2nd	400 m hurdles
1987	Pan American Games	Indianapolis, United States	1st	400 m hurdles
1988	Summer Olympics	Seoul, South Korea	5th	400 m hurdles
1988	Summer Olympics	Seoul, South Korea	2nd	4 × 400 m relay
1990	Goodwill Games	Seattle, United States	1st	400 m hurdles
1991	World Championships	Tokyo, Japan	2nd	400 m hurdles
1991	World Championships	Tokyo, Japan	3rd	4 × 400 m relay
1992	Summer Olympics	Barcelona, Spain	2nd	400 m hurdles
1993	World Championships	Stuttgart, Germany	3rd	400 m hurdles
