= Pedro Rodrigues (hurdler) =

Portuguese hurdler

Personal information
- Born: 8 July 1971 (age 55) Lisbon, Portugal

Sport
- Sport: Track and field

Pedro Afonso Rodrigues (born 8 July 1971) is a retired Portuguese athlete who specialized in the 400 metres hurdles.

== Career ==
Born in Lisbon, Rodrigues represented S.L. Benfica at club level.

Rodrigues was an All-American hurdler for the USC Trojans track and field team, finishing 7th in the 400 metres hurdles at the 1994 NCAA Division I Outdoor Track and Field Championships.

He finished fourth at the 1994 European Championships in Athletics. He also competed at the 1991 World Championships, the 1992 Olympic Games, the 1993 World Championships, the 1999 World Championships, the 2000 Olympic Games and the 2002 European Championships without reaching the final.

Rodrigues' personal best time was 48.77 seconds, achieved at the 1994 European Championships in Helsinki.
