= Mark Thompson (hurdler) =

Jamaican Olympic hurdler (born 1967)

Personal information
- Born: 2 August 1967 (age 58) Jamaica
- Height: 185 cm (6 ft 1 in)
- Weight: 82 kg (181 lb)

Sport
- Country: Jamaica
- Sport: Hurdling

Achievements and titles
- Personal best: 49.37

Mark Thompson (born August 2, 1967) is a Jamaican Olympic hurdler. He represented his country in the men's 400 metres hurdles at the 1992 Summer Olympics. His time was a DQ in the qualifiers.

He is married to the Bahamian former sprinter Pauline Davis-Thompson.

He is the uncle of NBA basketball players Ausar Thompson and Amen Thompson.
