= Chanon Keanchan =

Thai hurdler

Personal information
- Nationality: Thai
- Born: 24 January 1967 (age 59)

Sport
- Sport: Track and field
- Event: 400 metres hurdles
Medal record
Men's athletics
Representing Thailand
Asian Championships
| Silver medal – second place | 1993 Manila | 400 m hurdles |

Chanon Keanchan (born 24 January 1967) is a Thai hurdler. He competed in the men's 400 metres hurdles at the 1992 Summer Olympics.
