= David Patrick (sprinter) =

American hurdler (born 1960)

Personal information
- Born: June 12, 1960 (age 66) Centralia, Illinois, United States

Sport
- Sport: Track and field
- Event: 400 metres hurdles
Medal record
Representing United States
IAAF World Cup
Gold medal – first place	1989 Barcelona	400m hurdles
Pan American Games
Bronze medal – third place	1987 Indianapolis	400m hurdles
Summer Universiade
Gold medal – first place	1987 Zagreb	400m hurdles
Gold medal – first place	1987 Zagreb	4x400m relay
Silver medal – second place	1981 Bucharest	4x400m relay
Bronze medal – third place	1983 Edmonton	400m hurdles

David Patrick (born June 12, 1960, in Centralia, Illinois) is an American retired hurdler. He ran the 400 metres hurdles in the 1992 Summer Olympics and was the second American in the final. The race was won by Kevin Young while setting a world record in the event.

Patrick won two individual NCAA titles (880 yards indoor, 400 meter hurdles) while competing for the University of Tennessee.

Patrick is the husband of Sandra Farmer-Patrick, who was also an elite 400 metres hurdler. The two had a history of success at the same meets, including the 1989 IAAF World Cup in Barcelona, Spain, where both took the gold medal. It was the first time a husband and wife won a gold medal in the same event in international championship. Earlier that year, they had become the first husband and wife to both win national championships at the same time since Hal Connolly and Olga Connolly did the same thing 29 years earlier. The couple were exorcising frustration at the 1988 U.S. Olympic Trials when both failed to qualify. He was the bronze medallist at the 1988 IAAF Grand Prix Final that year. David set his personal record in the 400 hurdles at 47.75 while finishing fourth behind eventual Olympic Champion Andre Phillips, the legend of the event Edwin Moses and future world record holder Kevin Young (with 1984 Silver Medalist Danny Harris, one one-hundredth of a second behind Patrick). Running in the difficult lane one, Patrick was behind off the final turn but made an impressive surge at the end of the race to miss making the team by 0.03. His time makes him still the 22nd best performer in the event. That year, wife Sandra was disqualified after winning her semi-final. David had also attempted to qualify in the 800 metres in 1988.

In 1992, both made the Olympic team with David finishing second just behind Kevin Young and Sandra winning the Olympic Trials. Sandra won a silver medal in the event at the Olympics in 1992 and again made the team in 1996.

David Patrick was ranked in the top 10 Americans from 1981 to 1994, except in 1982 and was in the top 5 through most of that from 1983 to 1993 when the United States was dominating the event with Moses, Phillips, Harris and Young being the best in the world.

He should not be confused with another David Patrick, from Villanova, who ran the 1500 metres in the 1968 Olympic Trials.
