= Mark Jackson (hurdler) =

Canadian track and field athlete

Personal information
- Born: May 15, 1969 Toronto, Canada
- Died: September 4, 2006 (aged 37)

Sport
- Sport: Track and field

Mark Benjamin Jackson (May 15, 1969–September 4, 2006) was a retired track and field athlete from Canada, who competed in the men's 400m hurdles event. He competed for his native country at the 1992 Summer Olympics in Barcelona, Spain, finishing in 19th place. He was born in Toronto, Ontario.

In addition to his successes as a track and field athlete, Jackson is a world medalist in the sport of dragon boat racing. As a member of the Slipstream Dragon Boat crew from Toronto, Ontario, Jackson won a bronze medal in the premier mixed 500 meter final at the Lee Kum Kee Dragon Boat Carnival and Club Crew World Championships in Hong Kong in 2012.
