= Oleh Tverdokhlib =

Personal information
- Born: 3 November 1969 Dnipropetrovsk, Soviet Union
- Died: 18 September 1995 (aged 25) Dnipropetrovsk, Ukraine

Sport
- Sport: Track and field
Medal record
Representing Ukraine
European Championships
Gold medal – first place	1994 Helsinki	400 m hurdles
IAAF World Cup
Silver medal – second place	1994 London	400 m hurdles
European Cup
Silver medal – second place	1994 Birmingham	400 m hurdles
Bronze medal – third place	1993 Rome	400 m hurdles
Representing Soviet Union
Summer Universiade
Bronze medal – third place	1991 Sheffield	400 m hurdles

Oleh Tverdokhlib (Ukrainian: Олег Твердохліб; 3 November 1969 – 18 September 1995) was a Ukrainian athlete. He was still an improving competitor at 400 metre hurdles when he was killed by electric shock while fixing wiring at his parental home in September 1995.

At global level in athletics he had finished both sixth in the 1992 Summer Olympics and 1993 World Championships in Athletics finals at 400 m hurdles. Previously he had taken the bronze medal at the 1991 Summer Universiade.

His biggest triumph was undoubtedly his victory at the 1994 European Championships in Athletics held in Helsinki, Finland. On 10 August 1994 he ran a personal best and Ukrainian record of 48.06 seconds to claim gold and win the European title. This enabled him to represent Team Europe at the 1994 IAAF World Cup in this discipline. He again excelled at this meeting with a superb second place behind Samuel Matete of Zambia and Team Africa.
