= Kevin Young (hurdler) =

American athlete (born 1966)

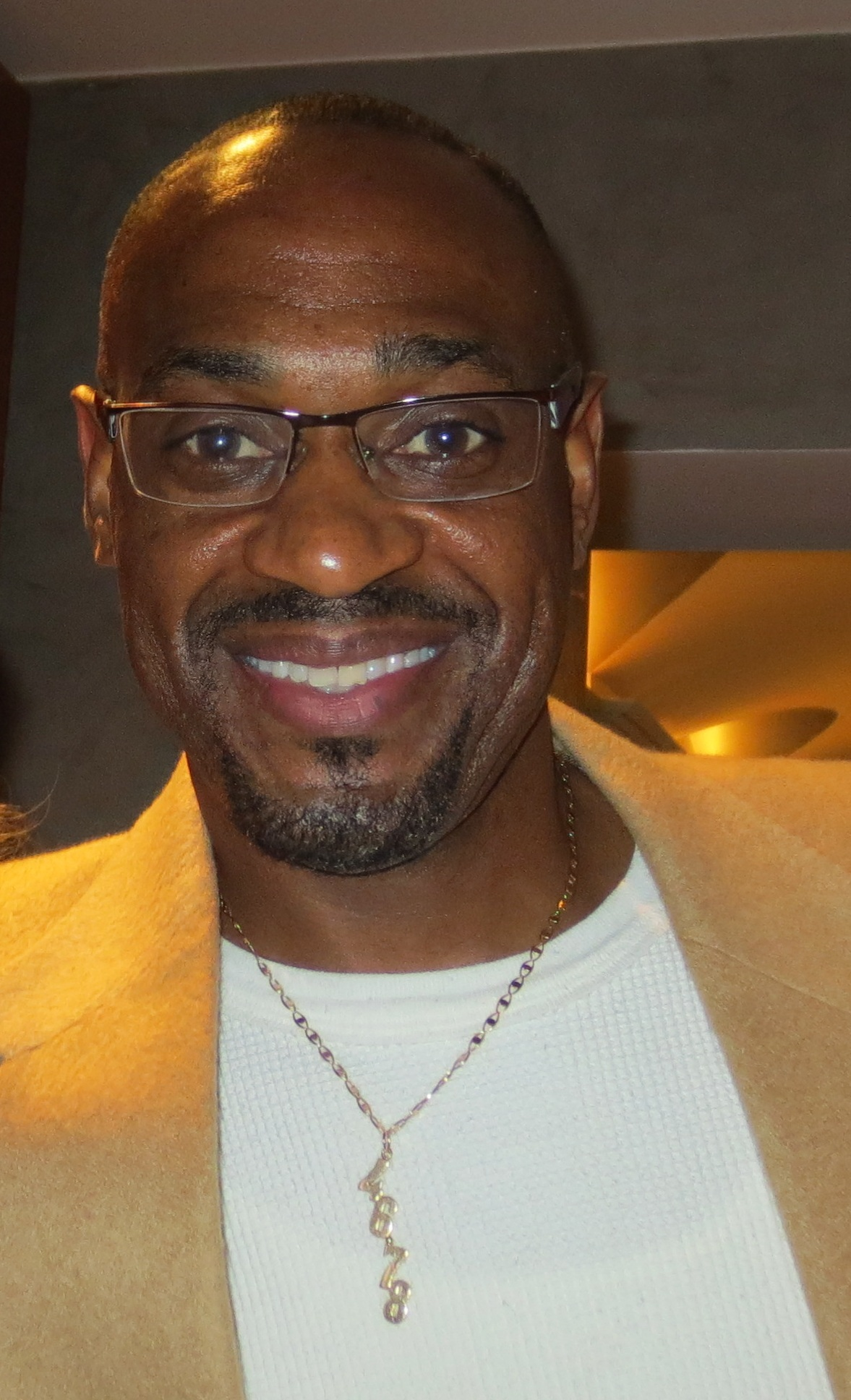
- Young in 2012

Personal information
- Born: September 16, 1966 (age 59) Watts, California, U.S.
- Height: 6 ft 4 in (193 cm)
- Weight: 181 lb (82 kg)

Sport
- Country: United States
- Sport: Track
- Event: 400 m hurdles
- College team: UCLA
- Club: Santa Monica Track Club
Medal record
Men's athletics
Representing the United States
Olympic Games
Gold medal – first place	1992 Barcelona	400 m hurdles
World Championships
Gold medal – first place	1993 Stuttgart	400 m hurdles
Pan American Games
Silver medal – second place	1987 Indianapolis	400 m hurdles

Kevin C. Young (born September 16, 1966) is an American former athlete. He was the winner of the 400 metres hurdles at the 1992 Summer Olympics. In the final of this event he set a world record and Olympic record of 46.78 seconds, the first time the 47-second barrier was broken, and a world record that stood for nearly 29 years until it was broken by Karsten Warholm on July 1, 2021.

He became the 400 m hurdles world champion the following year, winning at the 1993 World Championships in Athletics with a time of 47.18 seconds. He had an unusual hurdling technique of switching between 12 and 13 strides between the hurdles, departing from the 13-stride technique popularized by Edwin Moses.

Young's performances declined after 1993. He was inducted into the National Track & Field Hall of Fame in 2006.

== Career ==
=== Early life ===
At Jordan High School, the same high school that Florence Griffith-Joyner had attended years earlier, Young was first successful as a 110-meter hurdler, finishing in third place at the 1984 CIF California State Meet. As a UCLA "walk-on", Young was 5th place at the 1985 Pac-10 championships running the 400-meter hurdles in 51.09 seconds. This all changed his sophomore year. Limiting the amount of time and effort in other events (110 hurdles, triple jump, and long jump) he applied more detail towards the 400-meter hurdles and 4 × 400-meter relay. The Bruin won the 1986 Pac-10 400 m hurdles title on the advice of Andre Phillips sharing his knowledge of running this distance at the Los Angeles Coliseum under windy conditions. There he set a then Pac-10 record of 49.02 seconds. While in Indiana for that year's 1986 NCAA Championships, Young was a surprise second-place finisher behind the 1984 Olympic silver medalists, Danny Harris of Iowa State. While running between the fourth and fifth hurdles, he took eleven (11) strides between the barriers, a feat only repeated by him six years later during the first round of 1992 Barcelona Olympic 400-meter hurdles. At the 1987 NCAA championships at LSU, he captured a pair of NCAA titles in 400-meter hurdles and 4 × 400-meter relay. He and his Bruin 4 × 400 m relay teammates of Anthony Washington, Henry Thomas, and Danny Everett set a then NCAA and collegiate record of 3:00.55. In 1988 during his senior year at UCLA, Young defended his third PacC-10 400 m hurdles title and won his second NCAA 400 m hurdles title, running 47.85 seconds. With the addition of California prep 400 m specialist Steven Lewis, the Bruins' 4 × 400 m relay team became the first ever collegiate team to run under 3 minutes (2:59.91; relay splits: Steve Lewis 45.1, Kevin Young 44.3, Danny Everett, 45.4, Henry Thomas 45.1), 2:59.91 CR. These records stood for 17 years, with the 400 m hurdles being broken by Kerron Clement (47.56) and relay by LSU (2:59.59). Kevin Young finished his senior year as team captain and the most valuable male collegiate athlete in the United States, winning the Jumbo Elliott Award. Young graduated from UCLA setting junior and senior class records in the 400 m hurdles (48.15 and 47.72 respectively).

Young made his debut in international competition at the 1986 Goodwill Games in Moscow, USSR, and later at the 1987 Pan American Games in Indianapolis placing second. At the 1988 Summer Olympics, Young finished fourth just behind Edwin Moses (whose record Young would replace four years later) in his final race. At the 1991 World Championships, Young was again fourth.

=== Olympic gold and world record ===
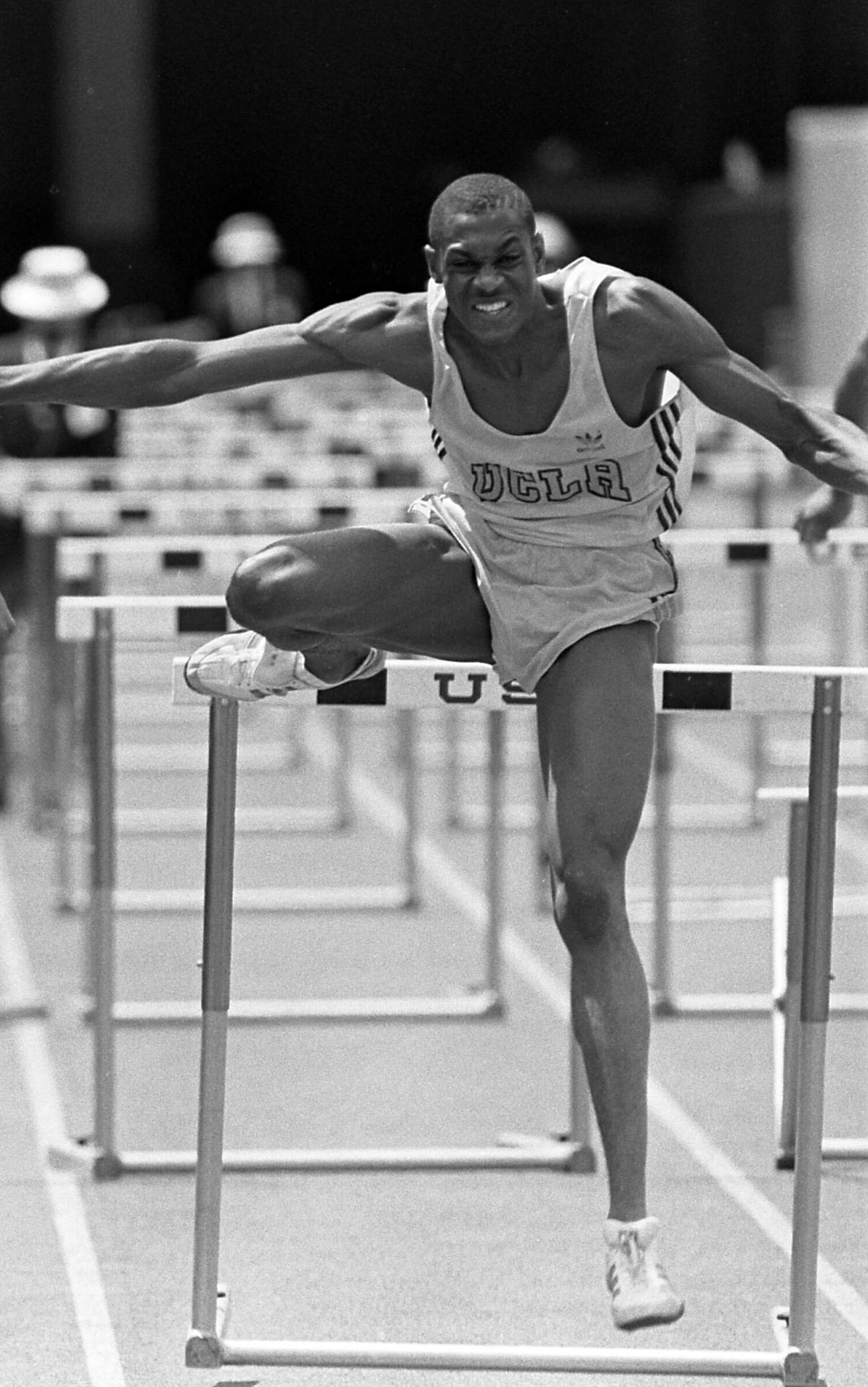
Young competing for UCLA in 1986

In 1992, Young won his first USA Outdoor Track and Field Championships title and was unbeaten prior to the Barcelona Olympics. Running in lane 4, Young appeared to have the slowest reaction to the gun of the field. To his inside, Winthrop Graham was the first over the first hurdle. Using a left leg lead, 13 strides to the second hurdle, he had pulled to just slightly behind Graham. Between the next two hurdles he ran 12 strides, alternating to the right leg lead over the fourth hurdle. Over the fifth hurdle he had made up the stagger on Kriss Akabusi to his outside. Relative to the hurdles, he had clearly passed Graham with the rest of the field clearly a full stride or more behind. Running 13 strides the rest of the way, he passed the rest of the competitors to his outside between the next two hurdles. A one stride lead over Graham at the eight hurdle became two by the ninth. Young was still powerful as Graham was struggling. Young tried to maintain that power into the final hurdle though he came up a little short, catching the face of the hurdle with his lead leg heel, riding the hurdle to the ground. He maintained his powerful stride to the finish. Realizing he had the clear victory, he raised his right arm in celebration 10 meters before the finish, slowing his last four strides.

Still, Young won with a new world record of 46.78. He was the first person to have run 400 m hurdles in less than 47 seconds. The world record was unbeaten for nearly 30 years until Karsten Warholm ran 46.70 in Oslo, on 1 July 2021.

Young became the first ever ESPY award winner in track presented by ESPN.

It is well noted that Young, throughout the 1992 season prior to Barcelona, placed small pieces of paper with the numbers 46.89 in each running spike. He had mentally convinced himself that running under 47 seconds was possible.

In 1993, Young won his second US National Championships title and had 25 consecutive wins until he was beaten by Samuel Matete from Zambia just two weeks before the 1993 World Championships. In the World Championships final, however, Young again made a decisive move between hurdles 7 and 8. He held this lead until the finish, beating Matete by 0.42 seconds.

=== Later career ===
After 1993, Young's performances on the track declined for a number of reasons. Young left from his training base in California and departed from his former coach John Smith. He raced at just two meetings in 1994: he took second at the New York Games with a season's best of 49.70 seconds but failed to make the 400 m hurdles final at the USA Outdoor Track and Field Championships. He finished the season after the championships. There he focused on working within the Atlanta community doing appearances at many local Atlanta Boys and Girls Clubs, appearing at toy drives for homeless shelter families. Still nursing a nagging knee injury, Young looked forward to a meaningful 1995 season practicing at Life College. Unable to manage with a meniscus tear on his lead leg, the injury compromised his season requiring surgery two days after his birthday. With help from coach Bobby Kersee, Young was eager to get ready for the Atlanta trials, only to advance as far as the semis, placing fifth in his heat. Years after the 1996 trials Young embraced many opportunities to run overseas throughout Europe and in Israel. While racing in Greece in 1998, Young become a member of the Panhellinos Gymnastics Club. Minos Kiriakou, a local media tycoon welcomed their new club athlete. At the 1998 European "Group B" Champions Cup, Young won the 400 m hurdles event setting then a club record. Never "officially" retiring, Young simply marveled in the exploits of the newer talented group of hurdlers respecting their feats and his own achievements. He was inducted into the United States Track & Field Hall of Fame in 2006.

== Personal life ==
Young is a member of Alpha Phi Alpha fraternity.

Young is an artist with work on display through the Art of the Olympians.

In December 2019 Young, while a student at Swansea University, was involved in a road traffic crash in which he was the passenger on a double-decker bus that collided with a railway bridge on Neath Road in Swansea, South Wales. Young suffered a head injury and two broken ribs. One of eight people hurt, he tried to pull the windscreen off a woman passenger who remained conscious but later died.

== Awards ==
- World Athletics Awards

World Athlete of the Year (Men)：1992

Awards
Preceded by Sergey Bubka	United Press International; Athlete of the Year; 1992	Succeeded by Miguel Indurain
Preceded by Sergey Bubka	Men's Track & Field Athlete of the Year; 1992	Succeeded by Noureddine Morceli
Preceded by None	Men's Track & Field ESPY Award; 1993	Succeeded by Michael Johnson
Sporting positions
Preceded by Andre Phillips	Men's 400 m hurdles best year performance 1989	Succeeded by Danny Harris
Preceded by Samuel Matete	Men's 400 m hurdles best year performance 1992 — 1993	Succeeded by Derrick Adkins
